= Life (Gen Hoshino song) =

- Digital single cover

Single by Gen Hoshino

from the album Gen
- Language: Japanese
- A-side: "Why" (double A-side)
- B-side: "Odd Couple"; "Beyond the Sequence"
- Released: August 14, 2023
- Genre: Rock; R&B
- Length: 3:11
- Label: Speedstar
- Songwriter: Gen Hoshino
- Producer: Gen Hoshino

Gen Hoshino singles chronology
"I Wanna Be Your Ghost" (2022)	"Why" / "Life" (2023)	"Eureka" (2025)

Music video
- "Life" on YouTube

"Life" (Japanese: 生命体, Hepburn: Seimeitai; lit. 'Lifeform') is a song by Japanese singer-songwriter and musician Gen Hoshino from his sixth studio album, Gen (2025). Speedstar Records released the song as a digital-exclusive single on August 14, 2023, and later re-released it as a CD single with "Why" on December 27, 2023. Used as the theme song for TBS Television's broadcast of the 2022 Asian Games and 2023 World Athletics Championships, "Life" was written and produced by Hoshino, who co-arranged it with Mabanua. A fast-paced, piano and drum-driven rock and R&B song with elements of gospel, its lyrics interpret the mentality of athletes when competing in sports. Background vocals are performed with singer Ua.

"Life" was received positively by music critics in Japan, who praised its composition; some also found depth within the lyrics. Upon release, the song debuted at numbers 7 and 44 on the Billboard Japan Hot 100 and Oricon Combined Singles Charts, respectively. It topped the digital download component charts of both publications and was the most-aired song on Japanese radio within the week of release. The music video, directed by GroupN, features footage of Hoshino singing, interlayed with scenes of various people living their lives. The song was promoted on music television shows, including the 74th NHK Kōhaku Uta Gassen on New Year's Eve 2023.

== Background ==
Due to restrictions caused by the COVID-19 pandemic, the 2022 Asian Games were postponed to September and October 2023, only a month after the 2023 World Athletics Championships would be held in August. The song "All My Treasures" (2007) by Yūji Oda had served as the theme song for TBS Television's broadcast of the Athletics Championships for sixteen years; however, the 2023 event's close scheduling with the Asian Games prompted the network to commission an original theme song for their broadcast of both. They contacted Gen Hoshino, who accepted; he told Billboard Japan that he was honored to have been asked during the rare circumstance of two events being held so close together.

== Writing and production ==
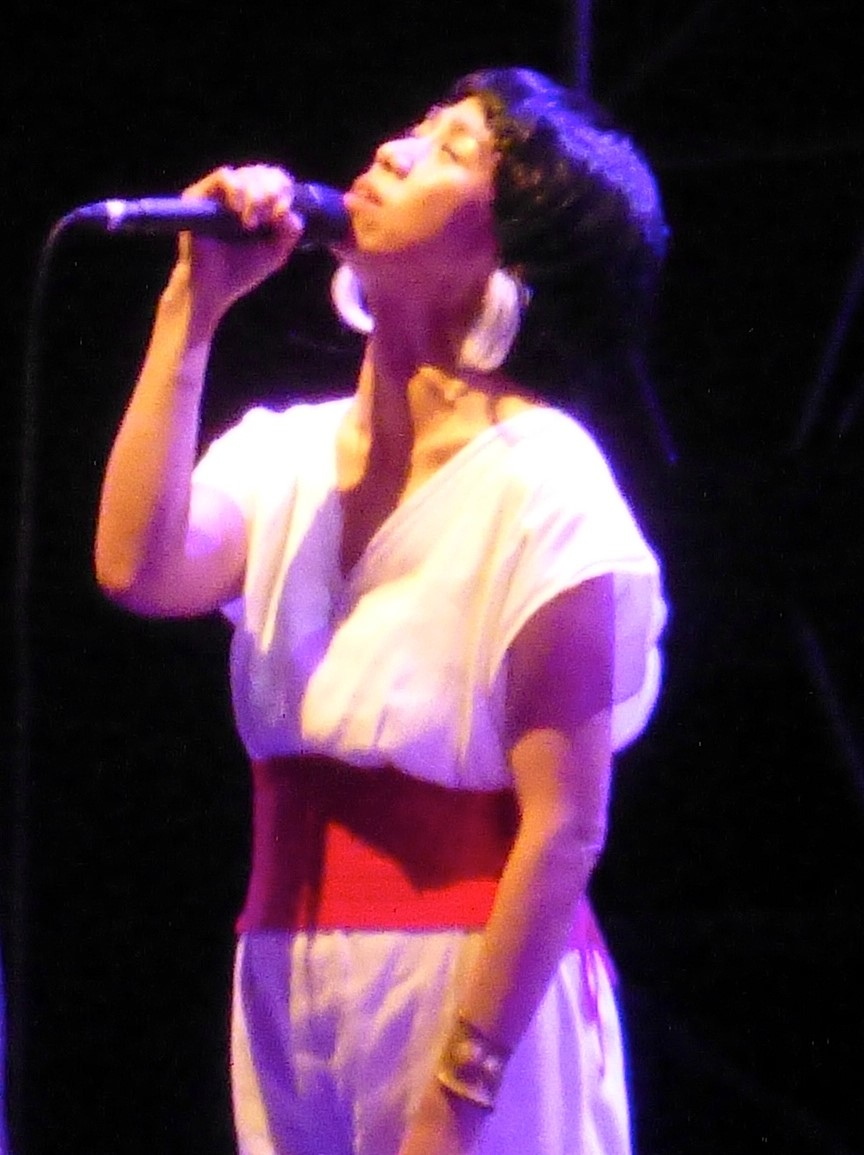
The song features guest background vocals by singer Ua (pictured in 2016).

Hoshino invisioned "Life" as a song that encourages athletes, sports fans, and everyone else that lives within the chaos of the present time. Written at the same time as Hoshino's EP Lighthouse (2023), roughly half of the song's lyrics had already been completed when he conceived the title "Life". The Japanese title, seimeitai (生命体), literally translates to lifeform, which Hoshino thought was perfect for the song's theming on living in present times. He related the concept of a living organism to sports: "Suddenly, I had this idea that people are born onto a racetrack of sorts, and we only feel freedom in respect to that race ... I think that not just humans, but everything living—even microrganisms that we cannot read the emotions of—live on that racetrack ... For a song about living in present times, I thought that the title 'Life', literally the body of a living creature, perfectly represented its relation to sports."

Musically, Hoshino intended to incorporate inspiration from gospel music to create a sound that releases listeners from ego and pressures. Himself not a Christian, he wanted to process gospel through his own musical style and only take inspiration to avoid distastefully replicating the genre. For the recording and mixing process, Hoshino said he had grown tired of the standard consistency in Japanese music production, so instead took an approach that prioritized the "soul" within the instrumental performance. For the song's drums, Hoshino had a real musician imitate what he had programmed: "There's something moving about a human performance that tries to imitate and outdo machines. It's a mixture of human and machine-like qualities."

"Life" features guest background vocals from solo singer Ua. Initially, Hoshino and usual collaborator Ryosuke Nagaoka tried to record the backing vocals on their own, but felt that something more was needed and considered enlisting the help of an outsider. Ua was suggested by her and Hoshino's mutual manager at Victor Entertainment. Hoshino liked the suggestion due to Ua's roots in gospel and soul music, but felt hesitant to reach out since her voice would most likely not be recognizable amongst the other singers. However, the manager thought this would make it easier for Ua to perform and went ahead with the offer; according to Hoshino, she gladly accepted.

== Composition and lyrics ==
"Life"
The end to the song's first chorus. "Life" features an almost acoustic-like instrumental, led by upright piano and drums. It is a rock and R&B song that takes inspiration from gospel.

"Life" was written and produced by Hoshino, who co-arranged it with frequent collaborator Mabanua. The instrumental line-up on the track is minimal and consists of only upright piano (performed by Hoshino and Mabanua), electric bass (Mabanua), drums (Shun Ishiwaka), alto saxophone (Satoru Takeshima), and handclaps (by background vocalists Nagaoka and Ua). Minus the electric bass, the entire instrumentation is almost acoustic, which writers for Rhythm & Drums Magazine noted as a departure from Hoshino's programming-heavy works in the years prior to the song. They also pointed out the absence of guitar. "Life" was mastered by Takahiro Uchida and mixed by Shojiro Watanabe; Satoshi Goto is credited with additional assistance. Recording is credited to Watanabe, Shu Saida, Mabanua, Hoshino, and Takeshima, the lattermost of which recorded his saxophone from home.

"Life" runs for 3 minutes and 11 seconds. Musically, it is a fast-paced rock and R&B song that reminisces to gospel music. The song is driven by the melodies of the upright pianos and the beat of Ishiwaka's drums, which move through quick chord changes. The track does not have a proper intro nor outro, representing the sudden start and end to life. From its opening, the drums on "Life" run dotted notes on a ride cymbal and leads the beat with a half open hi-hat. The chorus sees Hoshino singing in a high-pitched tone, whereas a solo on alto sax is performed by Takeshima in the song's middle phase.

The lyrics depicts the perceived mentality of an athlete competing and the exhilaration of sports: "Kaze ni hada ga mazari toketeku / Sakaime wa kieru" ("My skin melds with the wind and melts away / Boundaries disappear"). The text covers the continuation of life after the conclusion of a competition and ends with a return to reality: "Anata wa tashika ni koko ni iru / Soshite tsuzuku" ("Without a doubt, you're here / And life goes on"). (Note: English lyrics taken from Hoshino's official website)

== Release and promotion ==
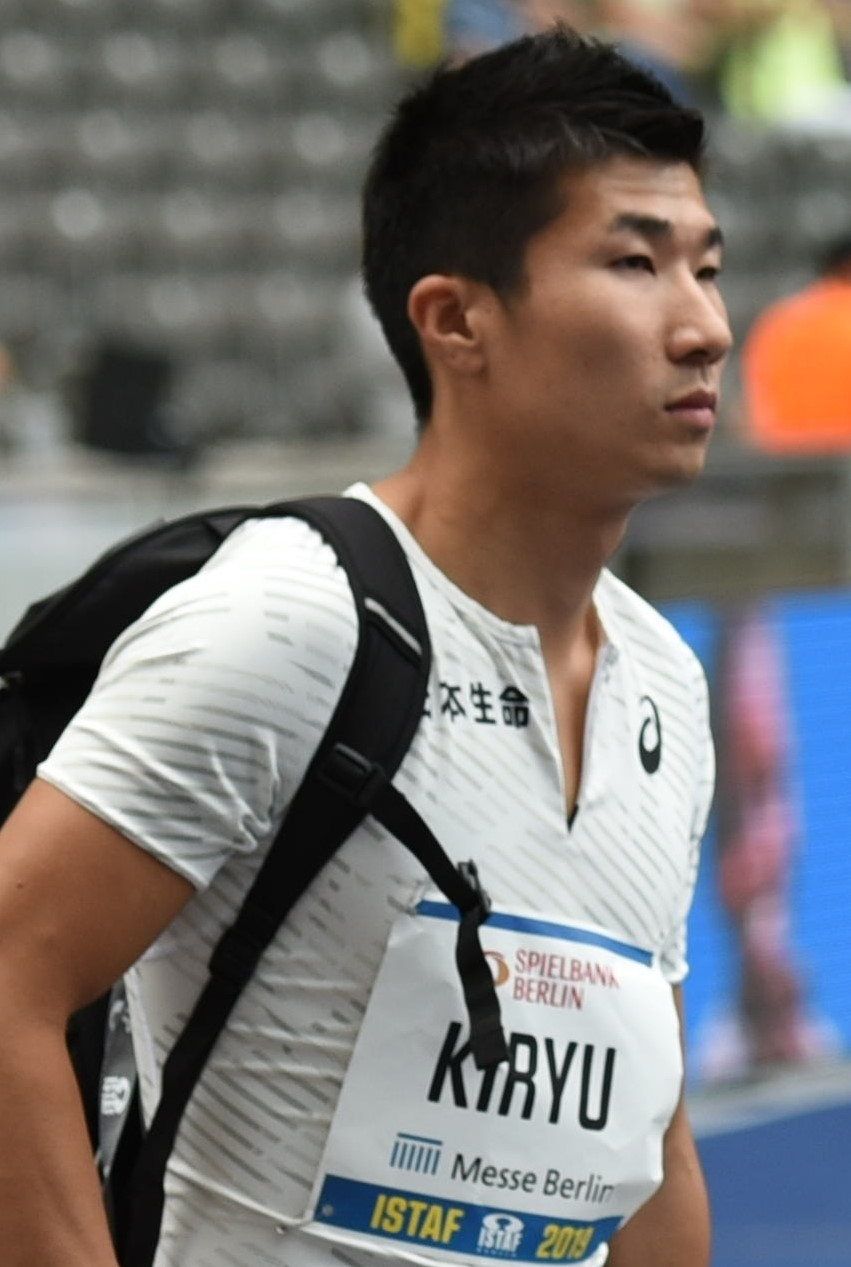
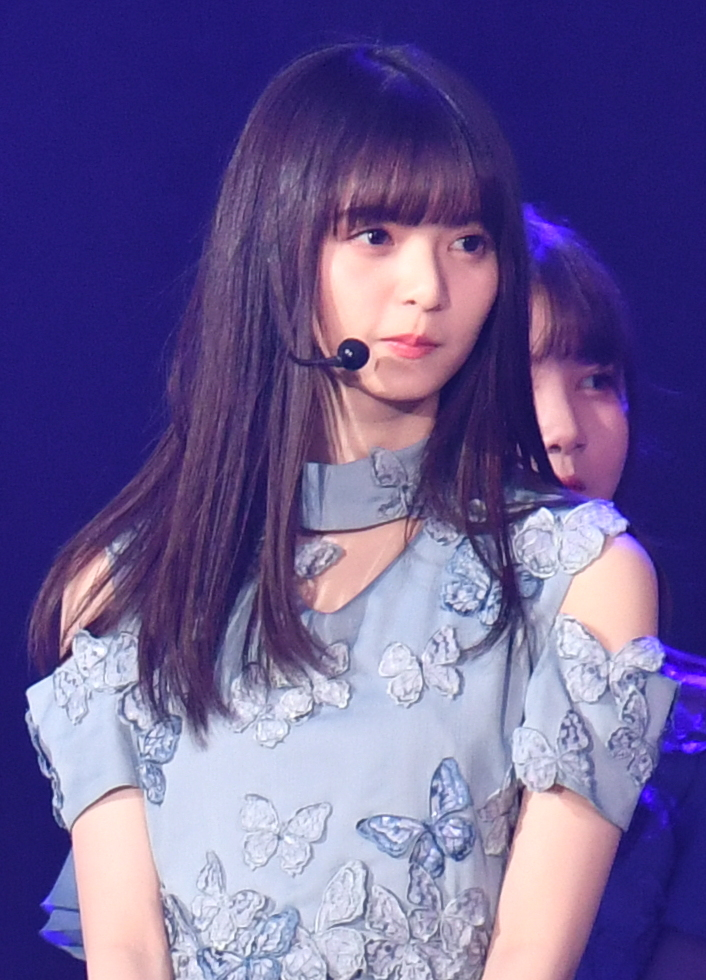
The music video to "Life" features sprinter Yoshihide Kiryū (left) and former Nogizaka46 member Asuka Saitō (right; both pictured in 2019), among others.

On June 30, 2023, "Life" was announced as the theme song to the 2023 World Athletics Championships and Asian Games on TBS. Alongside a new promotional artist visual on August 7, Hoshino announced that the song would be released as a single on August 14, 2023, five days ahead of the start of the Athletics Championships and nine days ahead of the Asian Games. On the slated date, "Life" was released as a digital-exclusive single by the Victor Entertainment label Speedstar Records, roughly one year after Hoshino's previous single "I Wanna Be Your Ghost" (2022). Promotion for the release included a virtual campaign by Victor where listeners could win a phone wallpaper based on the single's cover art, a two-set postcard set featuring photos of Hoshino, and a different wallpaper drawn by him.

GroupN directed the music video to "Life", which was premiered to YouTube on August 14, 2023, at 0:00 (JST). The video features Hoshino singing in an arena venue next to footage of "various people living in the present". Filmed in the span of four days, it includes guest appearances from some of the song's performing musicians like Mabanua and Ishiwaka, professional athletic sprinter Yoshihide Kiryū, former Nogizaka46 member Asuka Saitō, and dancer the D Soraki. The scenes of Hoshino singing are interlayed with the other footage via split screen to mimick the appearance of a running track.

Behind-the-scenes from the song's music video were released on September 13, 2023, and minute-long videos showing only Soraki and Saitō's dance performances were uploaded on September 29. In December 2024, audio commentary by Hoshino and his frequent video collaborator Santa Yamagishi was added to the "Life" music video utilizing YouTube's multi-language audio tracks feature.

=== Double A-side single ===
On December 27, 2023, "Life" was re-released as a double A-sided single with the song "Why", the ending theme to the anime film Spy × Family Code: White. Hoshino had announced in November that "Life" would be included as the latter half of a CD single, but did not immediately disclose details on other A-side. He revealed "Why" as its title on December 5, and officially announced it as the ending theme to Spy × Family Code: White on December 22, the day of the film's premiere. Hoshino's first CD single in over two years after "Fushigi" / "Create" (2021), the B-side to "Why" / "Life" features "Odd Couple"—a song written by Hoshino for the comedy duo Audrey's radio festival at the Tokyo Dome—and the instrumental "Beyond the Sequence", used in a commercial for UCC Ueshima Coffee starring Hoshino.

In an interview with Billboard Japan, Hoshino said that he did not initially intend to release "Why" and "Life" as double A-sides. However, upon the completion of "Why", he felt that the two songs had connected. Emi Sugiura, in a review of the double A-side for Rockin'On Japan, agreed on the connection. Despite their different identities musically, (Note: Unlike the acoustic rock-like style of "Life", "Why" is a pop ballad centered around programmed beats and piano.) Sugiura felt like "Why" was a sequel to the story of "Life", since both songs discuss living without seeking out meaning.

== Reception ==
Japanese music critics enjoyed "Life" and praised its composition and message; several critics noted the performance of the participating musicians. Writing for Real Sound, Tomoyuki Mori praised the song's gospel-influenced R&B sound, but particularly highlighted the melodies and Hoshino's vocal delivery: he called these innovative and wrote that they are carried by a "refined physicality". Emi Sugiura at Rockin'On Japan described "Life" as a supportive song—celebrating life—that encourages listeners to continue running forward. Amidst the simple composition, she found Ishiwaka's drumming and the background vocals of Ua and Nagaoka to be a tangible part of the composition's energy. Writers at Rhythm & Drums Magazine concluded that the song was dense on drums; they called Ishiwaka's drumming "vivid", as if it had been recorded in a spacious studio. Mori and Sugiura both found depth in the song's lyrics. Mori opined that the lyrics—which he felt leads listeners towards "total freedom" by "transcending [their] own consciousness"—increase in depth with each listen. Sugiura wrote that, despite the deep lyrics, the sound and Hoshino's vocals encourage listeners to not think too deeply about its meaning.

Commercially, "Life" sold 13,713 digital copies within its first week, according to Billboard Japan. They reported that it was the most downloaded song that week, as well as the most aired on radio. The song debuted at number 7 on the Billboard Japan Hot 100 and at number 44 on Oricon's Combined Singles Chart. It became Hoshino's third consecutive single to top the Billboard Japan Top Download Songs and his sixth total number one on the Oricon Digital Singles Chart.

== Live performances ==
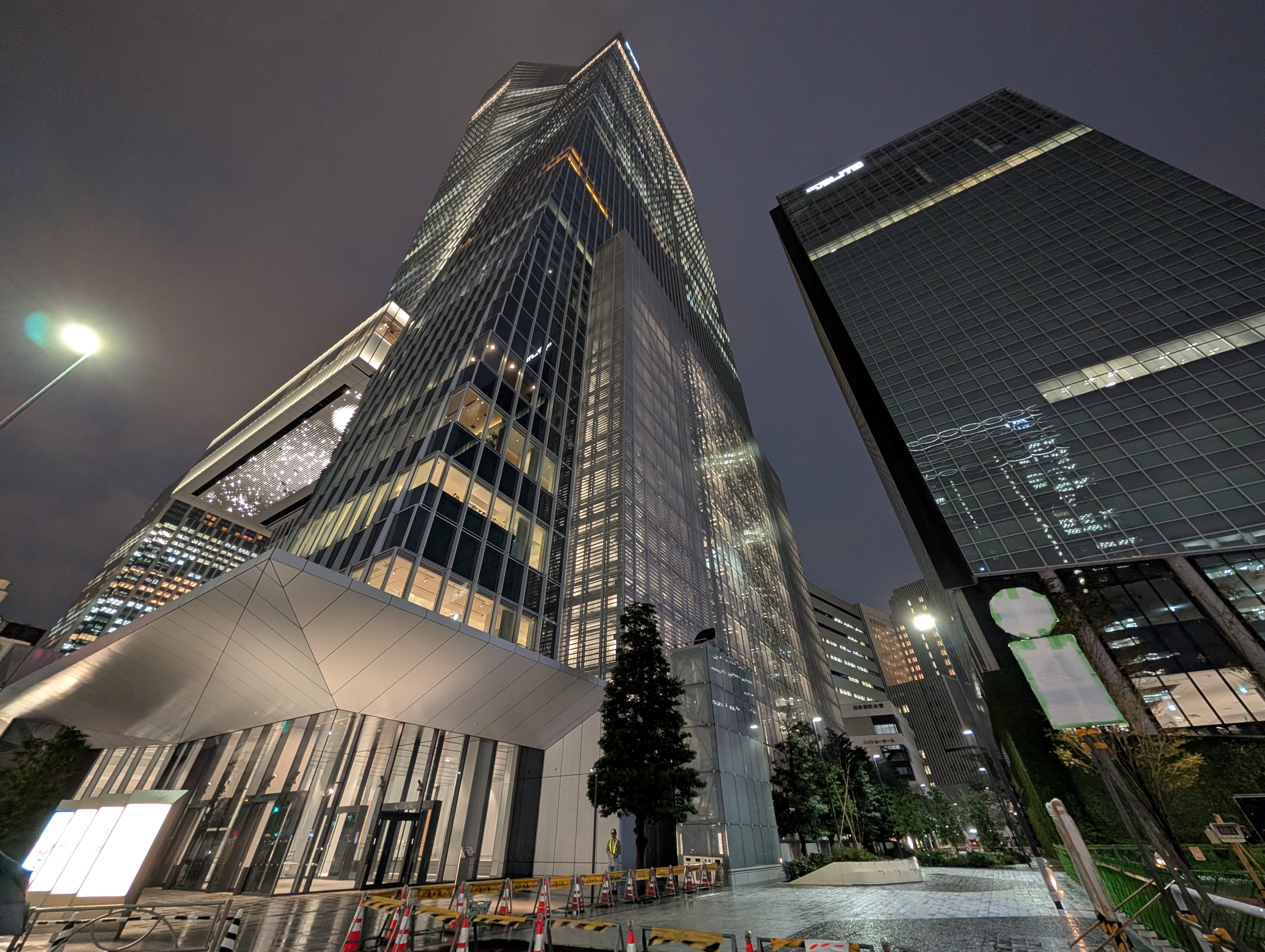
At the 74th NHK Kōhaku Uta Gassen, "Life" was performed from the top of the Toranomon Hills skyscrapers (pictured).

Hoshino included "Life" on his setlists for several televised performances throughout 2023. Three times, he performed it for specials of CDTV Live! Live!: the first of these was on the day of the song's release (August 14), where it accompanied performances of Hoshino's "Sun" (2015) and "Pop Virus" (2018); the second was alongside Hoshino's debut single "Kudaranai no Naka ni" (2011) on September 14; the third was alongside "Comedy" (2022) on the program's Christmas special on December 18. On September 21, 2023, Hoshino appeared on NHK's Songs to perform "Life", "Fushigi", and an acoustic version of his 2016 single "Koi". In December, he returned to NHK for the 74th iteration of the annual New Year's Eve special Kōhaku Uta Gassen. His ninth consecutive appearance on the special, Hoshino performed "Life" in front of a nighttime backdrop from a top floor of a Toranomon Hills skyscraper in Minato, Tokyo. The Kōhaku performance was uploaded in full to NHK's YouTube account, but has since been removed.

== Personnel ==
Credits adapted from Hoshino's website

- Gen Hoshino – vocals, background vocals, upright piano, handclaps, songwriting, arrangement, production, recording
- Mabanua – electric bass, upright piano, co-arrangement, recording
- Shun Ishiwaka – drums
- Satoru Takeshima – alto saxophone, recording
- Ryosuke Nagaoka – background vocals, handclaps, background vocals arrangement
- Ua – background vocals, handclaps
- Shu Saida – recording
- Shojiro Watanabe – mixing, recording
- Takahiro Uchida – mastering
- Satoshi Goto – assistance

== Track listing ==
All tracks are written by Gen Hoshino expect where otherwise noted.

"Life" — digital single
No.	Title	Length
1.	"Life" (生命体, Seimeitai)	3:11

"Why" / "Life" — Regular edition
No.	Title	Length
1.	"Why" (光の跡, Hikari no Ato, lit. 'Traces of Light')	4:10
2.	"Life"	3:13
3.	"Odd Couple" (おともだち, Otomodachi, lit. 'Friends')	3:12
4.	"Beyond the Sequence"	3:25
Total length:		14:00

"Why" / "Life" — Limited edition (DVD/Blu-ray – YP Live Streaming Enkai Hōō-hen)
No.	Title	Length
1.	"Opening"	2:03
2.	"Episode" (エピソード, Episōdo)	2:28
3.	"Sun"	4:11
4.	"Dust" (ダスト, Dasuto)	4:29
5.	"Doraemon" (ドラえもん)	4:13
6.	"Tomato" (そしたら, Soshitara, lit. 'And Then')	3:03
7.	"Dancer" (ダンサー, Dansā)	3:17
8.	"Stove" (ストーブ, Sutōbu)	3:37
9.	"Nothing"	5:37
10.	"Record Noise" (レコードノイズ, Rekōdo Noizu)	6:08
11.	"Fushigi" (不思議, lit. 'Miracle')	5:00
12.	"Gag" (ギャグ, Gyagu)	4:48
13.	"Hello Song"	4:58
14.	"Documentary"

"Why" / "Life" — Limited edition (DVD/Blu-ray – Live the Speedstar)
No.	Title	Length
15.	"Opening"	1:04
16.	"Hirameki" (ひらめき, lit. 'Flash')	3:19
17.	"Barabara" (ばらばら, lit. 'Scatter')	4:05
18.	"Sūdara Bushi" (スーダラ節, lit. 'Melody of Smooth Trickling'; writers: Yukio Aoshima, Hiroaki Hagiwara; original artist: Crazy Cats)	3:55
19.	"Koi" (恋, lit. 'Love')	5:35
20.	"Bakemono" (化物, lit. 'Monster')	3:01
21.	"Why Don't You Play in Hell?" (地獄でなぜ悪い, Jigoku de Naze Warui, lit. 'What's Bad About Hell?')	4:17
22.	"Kuse no Uta" (くせのうた, lit. 'Habit Song')	5:10
23.	"Kudaranai no Naka ni" (くだらないの中に, lit. 'In the Nonsense')	5:19
Total length:		2:07:00

== Charts ==
Weekly chart performance for "Life"
Chart (2023)	Peak position
Japan (Billboard Japan Hot 100)	7
Japanese Combined (Oricon)	44

== Release history ==
Release dates and formats for "Life" and "Why" / "Life"
Region	Date	Release and edition	Format(s)	Label	Catalogue code	Ref(s).
Various	August 14, 2023	"Life" — digital single	Digital download; streaming	Speedstar Records	VE3WT-10580	
South Korea	August 14, 2023	"Life" — digital single	Digital download; streaming	J-Box Entertainment	—N/a	
Japan	December 27, 2023	"Why" / "Life" — standard	CD	Speedstar Records	VICL-37718	
Japan	December 27, 2023	"Why" / "Life" — limited	CD+Blu-ray (A); CD+DVD (B)	Speedstar Records	VIZL-2282 (A); VIZL-2283 (B)	
Various	December 27, 2023	"Why" / "Life" — standard	Digital download; streaming	Speedstar Records	—N/a	
South Korea	December 27, 2023	"Why" / "Life" — standard	Digital download; streaming	J-Box Entertainment	—N/a	
Japan	January 13, 2024	"Why" / "Life" — standard	Rental CD	Victor Entertainment	VICL-37718R	
