= Why (Gen Hoshino song) =

- Double A-side cover

Single by Gen Hoshino

from the album Gen
- Language: Japanese
- A-side: "Life" (double A-side)
- B-side: "Odd Couple"; "Beyond the Sequence"
- Released: December 27, 2023
- Studio: 808 (home studio)
- Genre: J-pop; anime song
- Length: 4:10
- Label: Speedstar
- Songwriter: Gen Hoshino
- Producer: Gen Hoshino

Gen Hoshino singles chronology
"I Wanna Be Your Ghost" (2022)	"Why" / "Life" (2023)	"Eureka" (2025)

Music video
- "Why" on YouTube

"Why" (Japanese: 光の跡, Hepburn: Hikari no Ato; lit. 'Traces of Light') is a song by Japanese singer-songwriter and musician Gen Hoshino from his sixth studio album, Gen (2025). The song was written and produced by Hoshino, who co-arranged and programmed it with Mabanua. The song was released by Speedstar Records on December 27, 2023, as a double A-sided single with "Life". It was used as the ending theme to the anime film Spy × Family Code: White (2023) and follows the song "Comedy" (2022) that Hoshino wrote for the film's preceding TV-series. Musically, it is a mid-tempo J-pop ballad with a nostalgic-like sound that lyrically questions why people make memories despite the fragility of life.

Hoshino traveled to Kanazawa, Ishikawa Prefecture, to find inspiration for the song. Upon returning home, he fell into a depressed state where he was unable to write the song's lyrics. Themed around the word kōseki (光跡)—meaning traces of a moving light—he began to write about his current worries and struggles, which he believed started to match with the plot of Spy × Family. "Why" was envisioned as a follow-up to the lyrics of "Comedy", but the musical roots go backwards and take inspiration from 1980s R&B and 90s hip-hop.

"Why" was surprise revealed as the ending theme to Spy × Family Code: White on the day of the film's premiere. A pouch with illustrations of Spy × Family characters drawn by Hoshino were shipped with the single to promote its release; first edition discs contain footage of live performances. The song was received positively by music critics for both its lyrics and music. Commercially, it reached number three on the Billboard Japan Hot 100 and took first place on Plantech's Japanese airplay chart, while the double A-sided CD single entered at number two on the Oricon Singles Chart and Billboard Japan's Top Singles Sales chart. An accompanying music video, directed by Kyōtarō Hayashi, was released with the single and intersects shots of scenery with Hoshino singing.

== Background ==
In April 2022, Gen Hoshino released the song "Comedy" as the ending theme to the first season of the anime TV-series Spy × Family. The song's sound drew from early 2000s hip-hop influences, and lyrically aimed to represent something similar to what Hoshino believed had been represented by the Forger family in the Spy × Family manga: a family that cares for each other without regard to connection by blood. Alongside the opening theme "Mixed Nuts" by Official Hige Dandism, "Comedy" was commercially successful and ranked within the top 15 of Billboard Japan's 2022 year-end anime song chart. It became Hoshino's second song to surpass one hundred million streams after "Fushigi" (2021), and marked his debut on the Billboard Global 200.

Hoshino's song "Life"—theme song for the broadcast of the 2022 Asian Games and 2023 World Athletics Championships on TBS Television channels—was released as a digital-exclusive single in August 2023. Hoshino announced in November 2023 that "Life" would be released as a double A-sided single, and later unveiled the Japanese title "Traces of Light" (光の跡, Hikari no Ato) for its partner track, but did not elaborate on further details. On December 22, 2023, it was surprise-revealed that "Traces of Light" ("Why" in English) had been written as the ending theme to the Spy × Family film continuation Code: White (2023), which premiered the same day as the announcement. Official Hige Dandism were also brought back for the film and recorded the main theme "Soulsoup".

== Writing and inspiration ==
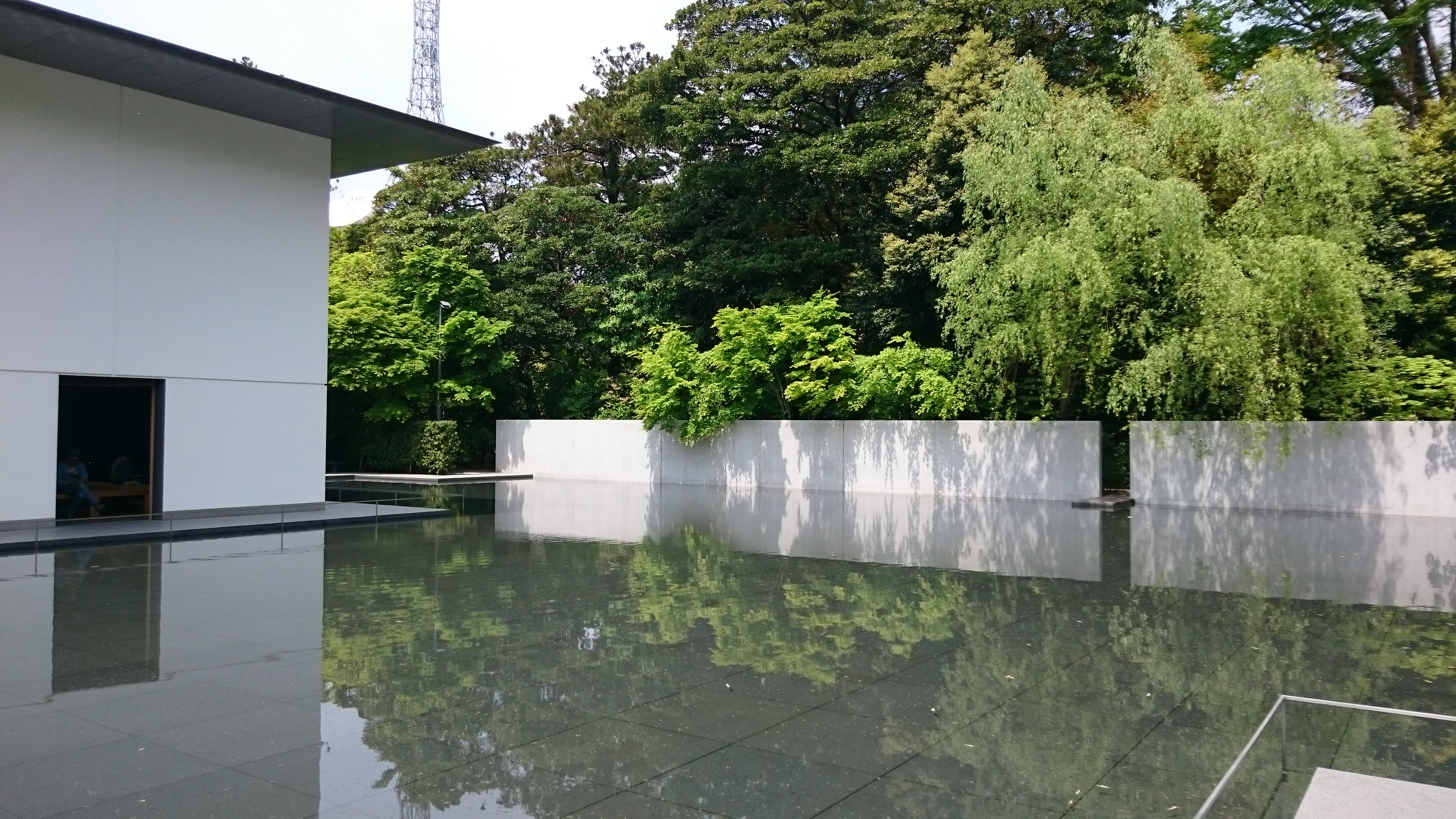
To write, "Why", Hoshino traveled to Kanazawa, Ishikawa Prefecture, where he was inspired by scenery such as the water at the D. T. Suzuki Museum (pictured).

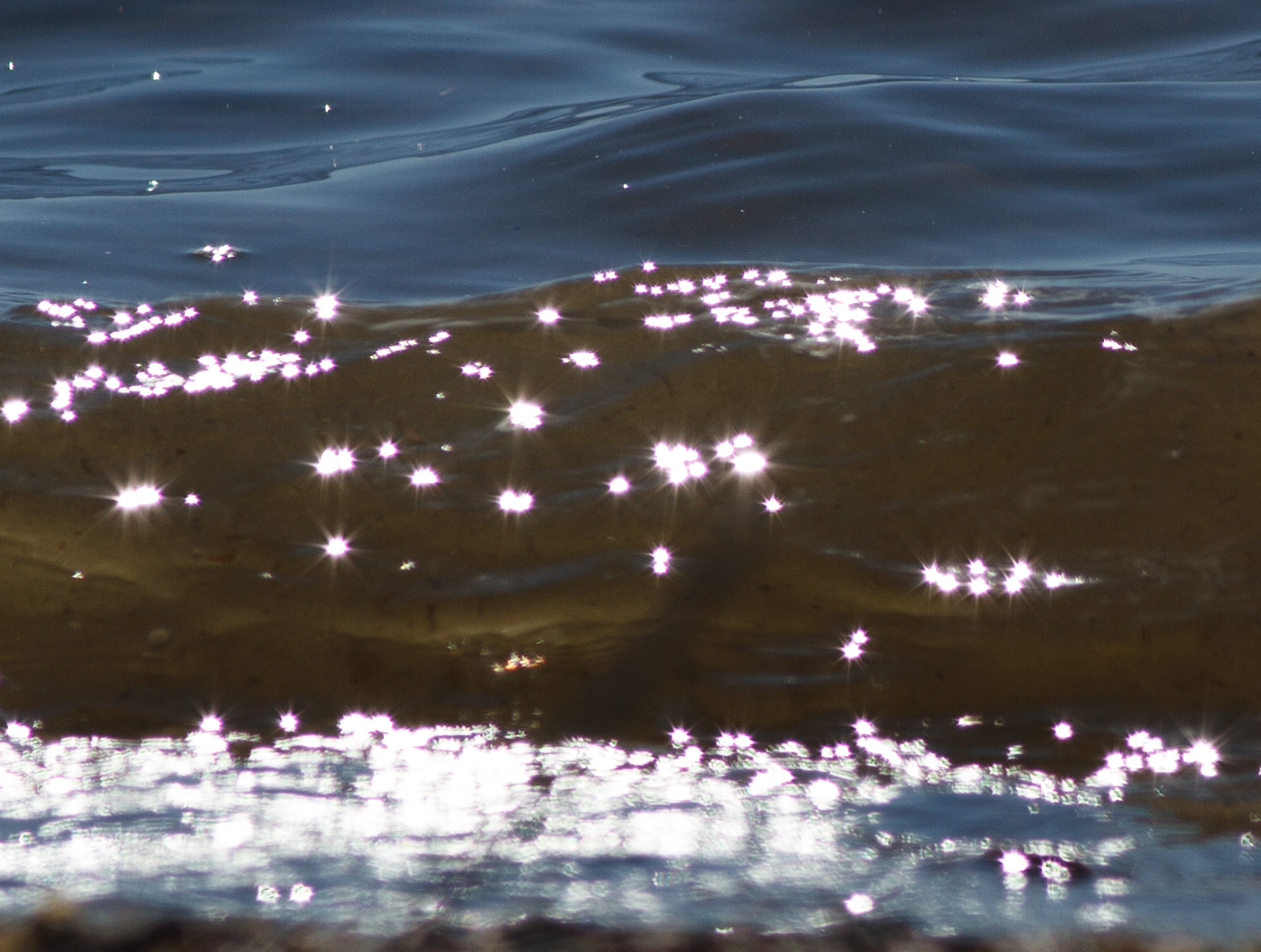
The song's motif is based on the word kōseki (光跡)—traces of a moving light. An occurrence such as the one pictured was filmed for the song's music video.

Hoshino wrote "Why" to be a continuation of "Comedy"; he thought the lyrics to "Why" should follow upon its predecessor, but sought to go backwards for the musical era of the sound. Unlike the 2000s hip-hop influences on "Comedy", Hoshino looked at 1980s R&B and 90s hip-hop, which he described as the sound of his youth. He wanted to let these Western influences into the song alike much of the anime music he listened to growing up, such as Ushio Hashimoto's "Romantic Ageru yo" (1986) for Dragon Ball (1986–89): "The opener ["Makafushigi Adventure!"] is energetic and easy for kids to understand, but out of nowhere the ending theme is a grownup love song that suddenly throws you off. But that wistfulness stays with you and when you grow up, you get what the lyrics are saying. That sort of thing [is what I wanted]". However, Hoshino was reluctant to directly replicate genres. He told Real Sound that production mostly involved trying to "drag out the feelings [of that time's music] from the heart".

Before writing "Why", Hoshino traveled to Kanazawa, Ishikawa Prefecture, to put himself into the film's plot that inolves the Forger family going on a trip. During his trip, Hoshino was inspired by sights such as sunsets, or the ripples of water at the D. T. Suzuki Museum. Upon his return home, he had already finished the song's composition and thought to directly write the lyrics. However, he found himself in a depressed state of "nothingness" where everything he wrote felt out of place. In an interview with Billboard Japan, Hoshino theorized that the fatigue may have stemmed from a form of internal backlash after he had worked for three years during the COVID-19 pandemic. Hoshino decided to ignore the song's tie-up to Spy × Family and tried to write a song based on his current worries: despite life's fragility, why do people make memories they don't want to forget, such as the photos they take on trips, or the rainy town lined with trees he had walked in Kanazawa. The word kōseki (光跡)—meaning traces of a moving light—was adopted for the song's motif. (Note: The song's Japanese title (光の跡) includes both kanji used in 光跡: 光 (hikari; 'light') and 跡 (ato; 'trace/trail').) Hoshino had viewed a kōseki trail on the sea in Kanazawa and a similar sunset was filmed for the song's music video. Upon the quick completion of the first verse with the new writing approach, Hoshino believed that his own situation and troubles began to naturally connect to the film. The theming inspired the song's release with "Life"; Hoshino had not initially planned to release the songs together, but chose to do so after the completion of "Why" since he thought that their themes connected.

== Composition and lyrics ==
"Why"
A sample to the first chorus. "Why" is a pop ballad with a nostalgic-like sound, inspired by 1980s R&B and 90s hip-hop.

"Why" was written and produced by Hoshino from his home studio nicknamed 808; he co-arranged and programmed it with Mabanua. Hoshino performs on vocals, synthesizer, and Rhodes piano; Mabanua plays Rhodes and synth; long-time collaborator Ryosuke Nagaoka features on electric guitar and backing vocals; Hirotaka Sakurada plays piano, upright piano, and Rhodes. Musically, "Why" is a mid-tempo warm pop ballad above programmed beats, with a runtime of four minutes and ten seconds (4:10). The song features a nostalgic-like sound created by its synths and piano, as noted by Emi Sugiura at Rockin'On Japan, and is a modern rendition of 1980s R&B and 90s hip-hop genres according to Real Sound's Tomoyuki Mori. A writer for Drums & Rhythm Magazine called the drum sounds on "Why" reminiscent to sampled music; in comparison to the laid-back "Comedy", they thought it was more musically straightforward.

Lyrically, "Why" reminisces about the sights that will be forgotten with death and questions why people create memories despite life being fleeting: "Kiete yuku noni naze / Tada wasuretakunai omoide o / Fuyasu no darō" ("If they're going to fade away / Why make memories we just don't want to forget?"). (Note: English lyrics adapted from Hoshino's website) The lyrics are not a lament for life but do not seek out meaning, similar to "Life" which urges listeners to start running before seeking meaning. According to Mori, "Why" is an attempt by Hoshino to straightforwardly express his emotions. He described it as a song tied to fundamental questions about life and the human nature of seeking light.

== Promotion and release ==
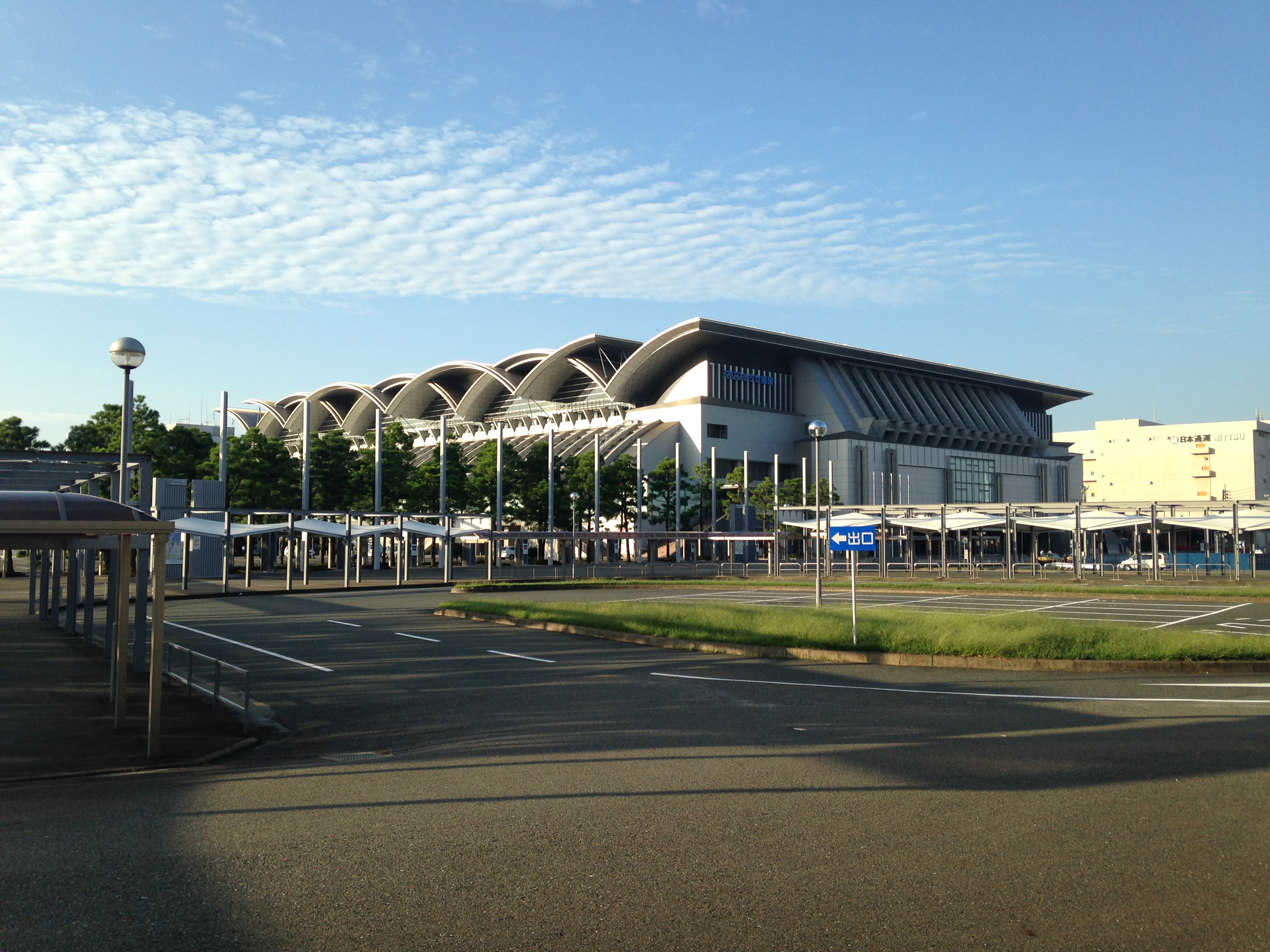
Live footage featured on the single's limited editions includes Hoshino performing at the Marine Messe Fukuoka (pictured) during the Live the Speedstar festival.

The same day of its announcement as the ending theme to Spy × Family Code: White, "Why" was previewed in a video of film snippets released to Toho Animation's YouTube channel, and the song was made available to national radio in Japan. "Why" / "Life" was released by the Victor Entertainment sub-label Speedstar Records on December 27, 2023, marking Hoshino's first CD single in almost two years following "Fushigi" / "Create" in 2021. On its B-side, the single features "Odd Couple"—a song written by Hoshino for the comedy duo Audrey's radio festival at the Tokyo Dome—and the instrumental "Beyond the Sequence", used in a commercial for UCC Ueshima Coffee starring Hoshino. To promote the release, it was announced that copies of the single would be shipped with illustrations of Spy × Family characters drawn by Hoshino. A late year release, the drawings were to be delivered in pochibukuro bags—pouches that are typically used by adults to give gift money to kids during Japanese New Year. At Tower Records, HMV, and Tsutaya record stores, the release was commemorated by the printing of special receipts and with displays of comments written onto cards by Hoshino. Hoshino gave a debut performance of "Why" during a two-hour special of CDTV Live! Live! on January 22, 2024.

First editions of the single were released in DVD and Blu-ray editions. They feature live footage from March 2023 of Hoshino's one-time online concert YP Live Streaming: Enkai Hōō-hen, a new accompanying documentary, and his appearance at Speedstar Records' Live the Speedstar festival. Enkai Hōō-hen was a part of his online Enkai concert series, livestreamed to subscribers of Hoshino's Yellow Magazine when physical venues were closed in response to the COVID-19 pandemic. Live the Speedstar was a festival at the Marine Messe Fukuoka organized by Speedstar Records to celebrate their 30th anniversary. Hoshino's appearance saw seven acoustic performances of his own songs and a cover of Crazy Cats' "Sūdara Bushi" (1961). Two thousand people who purchased the first edition received tickets to the exclusive event "Nama" Commentary ("生"コメンタリー, "Nama" Komentarī; "Live" Commentary), hosted by Hoshino with director Santa Yamagishi in Tokyo and Osaka. Hoshino announced plans to hold similar events in the future, and temporarily released the Tokyo show via his Yellow Magazine+ website.

Kyōtarō Hayashi directed the music video to "Why", which was premiered to YouTube on the day of the single's release, at 21:00 JST. The video features footage meant to engrave memories into viewers despite the fragility of life, intersected by scenes of Hoshino singing. It was promoted with a teaser video and a livestream featuring Hoshino; the latter hosted half an hour before the full premiere. A behind-the-scenes video was released on January 24, 2024, in which Hoshino discusses with Hayashi during the music video's creation.

== Reception ==
Japanese critics' opinions on "Why" were generally positive; some reviewers praised the song for its lyrics. Tomoyuki Mori at Real Sound wrote that it "certainly" reflects Hoshino's thoughts and called it a successful attempt at straightforwardly conveying his emotions. Emi Sugiura, a reviewer for Rockin'On Japan, called "Why" an honorable song for not seeking meaning. She wrote that it "embraces [her] with a warmth and loneliness" and reminded of the lives that have passed on. A couple of critics also gave positive commentary to the music production. A writer for Drums & Rhythm Magazine described the song's drumming as lively. Mori described Hoshino's vocals as fragile, elegant, and appealing when layered above the R&B and hip-hop composition.

Commercially, "Why" / "Life" sold 48,122 physical copies in Japan upon release and opened as the eight best-selling single of December 2023 on Oricon's monthly chart. Powered by sales from the previous year, the single opened at number two on the weekly Billboard Japan Top Singles Sales and Oricon Singles Charts dated January 8, 2024, behind only KinKi Kids' "Schrödinger", which had outsold it by over 100,000 units. As an individual song, "Why" peaked at number three on the Billboard Japan Hot 100—one spot ahead of "Schrödinger" but behind the long-time charting songs "Idol" by Yoasobi and "Show" by Ado. An anime song, it reached second place on Billboard's Hot Animation chart, behind only "Idol" which served as the opening theme to Oshi no Ko (2023). However, it surpassed "Idol" in physical sales and secured first place on Oricon's CD-only Anime Singles Chart. "Why" was successful on Japanese radio and entered at first place on Plantech's weekly airplay chart; a reporter for the chart described "Why" as a "landslide victory" for Hoshino and noted airplay of the song on both FM and AM channels, spanning several regions. As of March 2024, Oricon reports 54,651 lifetime physical sales for "Why" / "Life".

== Personnel ==
Credits adapted from Hoshino's website.

- Gen Hoshino – vocals, background vocals, Rhodes piano (MK-80), synthesizer (Minimoog, Matrix-12, 3rd Wave), programming, songwriting, arrangement, producer, recording
- Mabanua – Rhodes piano (MK-80), synthesizer (Minimoog, DX7, Prophet-5), programming, co-arrangement
- Hirotaka Sakurada – Rhodes piano (MK-80), piano, upright piano
- Ryosuke Nagaoka – electric guitar, background vocals, background vocals arrangement
- Shojiro Watanabe – mixing, recording
- Shu Saida – recording
- Takahiro Uchida – mastering
- Satoshi Goto – assistance

== Track listing ==
All tracks are written by Gen Hoshino expect where otherwise noted.

"Why" / "Life" — Regular edition
No.	Title	Length
1.	"Why" (光の跡, Hikari no Ato, lit. 'Traces of Light')	4:10
2.	"Life" (生命体, Seimeitai)	3:13
3.	"Odd Couple" (おともだち, O tomodachi, lit. 'Friends')	3:12
4.	"Beyond the Sequence"	3:25
Total length:		14:00

"Why" / "Life" — Limited edition (DVD/Blu-ray – YP Live Streaming Enkai Hōō-hen)
No.	Title	Length
1.	"Opening"	2:03
2.	"Episode" (エピソード, Episōdo)	2:28
3.	"Sun"	4:11
4.	"Dust" (ダスト, Dasuto)	4:29
5.	"Doraemon" (ドラえもん)	4:13
6.	"Tomato" (そしたら, Soshitara, lit. 'And Then')	3:03
7.	"Dancer" (ダンサー, Dansā)	3:17
8.	"Stove" (ストーブ, Sutōbu)	3:37
9.	"Nothing"	5:37
10.	"Record Noise" (レコードノイズ, Rekōdo Noizu)	6:08
11.	"Fushigi" (不思議, lit. 'Strange')	5:00
12.	"Gag" (ギャグ, Gyagu)	4:48
13.	"Hello Song"	4:58
14.	"Documentary"

"Why" / "Life" — Limited edition (DVD/Blu-ray – Live the Speedstar)
No.	Title	Length
15.	"Opening"	1:04
16.	"Hirameki" (ひらめき, lit. 'Flash')	3:19
17.	"Barabara" (ばらばら, lit. 'Scatter')	4:05
18.	"Sūdara Bushi" (スーダラ節, lit. 'Melody of Smooth Trickling'; writers: Yukio Aoshima, Hiroaki Hagiwara; original artist: Crazy Cats)	3:55
19.	"Koi" (恋, lit. 'Love')	5:35
20.	"Bakemono" (化物, lit. 'Monster')	3:01
21.	"Why Don't You Play in Hell?" (地獄でなぜ悪い, Jigoku de Naze Warui, lit. 'What's Bad About Hell?')	4:17
22.	"Kuse no Uta" (くせのうた, lit. 'Habit Song')	5:10
23.	"Kudaranai no Naka ni" (くだらないの中に, lit. 'In the Nonsense')	5:19
Total length:		2:07:00

== Charts ==
Weekly chart performance for "Why" (2024)
Chart (2024)	Peak position
Japan (Billboard Japan Hot 100)	3
Japanese Hot Animation (Billboard Japan)	2

Weekly chart performance for "Why" / "Life" (2024)
Chart (2024)	Peak position
Japanese Top Singles Sales (Billboard Japan)	2
Japan (Oricon)	2
Japanese Combined Singles (Oricon)	2
Japanese Anime Singles (Oricon)	1

== Release history ==
Release dates and formats for "Why" and "Why" / "Life"
Region	Date	Edition	Format(s)	Label	Catalogue code	Ref(s).
Japan	December 22, 2023	—N/a	Radio airplay	Unknown	—N/a	
Japan	December 27, 2023	Standard	CD	Speedstar Records	VICL-37718	
Japan	December 27, 2023	Limited	CD+Blu-ray (A); CD+DVD (B)	Speedstar Records	VIZL-2282 (A); VIZL-2283 (B)	
Various	December 27, 2023	Standard	Digital download; streaming	Speedstar Records	—N/a	
South Korea	December 27, 2023	Standard	Digital download; streaming	J-Box Entertainment	—N/a	
Japan	January 13, 2024	Standard	Rental CD	Victor Entertainment	VICL-37718R	
