= I Wanna Be Your Ghost =

2022 single by Gen Hoshino

Single by Gen Hoshino

from the album Gen
- Language: Japanese
- Released: July 18, 2022
- Genre: J-pop; dance
- Length: 3:45
- Label: Speedstar
- Songwriter: Gen Hoshino
- Producer: Gen Hoshino

Gen Hoshino singles chronology
"Comedy" (2022)	"I Wanna Be Your Ghost" (2022)	"Why" / "Life" (2023)

Music video
- "I Wanna Be Your Ghost" (feat. Ghosts) on YouTube

"I Wanna Be Your Ghost" (Japanese: 異世界混合大舞踏会, Hepburn: Isekai Kongō Dai-butōkai; lit. 'Grand Stage of Parallel Worlds') (Note: Officially subtitled with "feat. Ghosts" (feat. おばけ, feat. Obake) in parentheses.) is a song by Japanese singer-songwriter and musician Gen Hoshino from his fifth studio album, Gen (2025). It was released as a digital-exclusive single by Speedstar Records on July 18, 2022. The song was written and produced by Hoshino, who co-arranged and programmed it with Mabanua. Musically a J-pop and dance track with electronic instrumentation, it was commissioned for the film Yokaipedia (2022), a live-action adaptation of a children's book series by Kodansha; the production team asked Hoshino for a song to represent the world of ghosts from the movie. Lyrically, Hoshino sings of breaking the barriers of the worlds of humans and ghosts. The song features background vocals performed by voice actors Rie Kugimiya, Hiro Shimono, and Tomokazu Sugita, who portray the ghosts in Yokaipedia.

"I Wanna Be Your Ghost" was received positively by Japanese music critics for its production style and drew comparisons to Hoshino's preceding single "Comedy" (2022). Upon release, the song debuted at first place on the digital download component charts of both Billboard Japan and Oricon, while it reached numbers six and twenty-six on the parent Japan Hot 100 and Combined Singles charts, respectively. The accompanying animated music video—featuring a boy dancing with ghosts—was produced by the studio Outline, led by director Yūki Igarashi. Throughout 2022, Hoshino promoted the song with performances on the Spotify video series Go Stream and on the Christmas special of CDTV Live! Live!. Dressed as his alter ego character Akira Nise, Hoshino first sang it in front of a live audience as the closing song of his Reassembly tour in 2023.

== Background and composition ==
"I Wanna Be Your Ghost" was written as the main theme to the film Yokaipedia (2022), a Takashi Yamazaki-directed live-action adaptation of a Kodansha children's books series. Its plot follows three friends who are transported to an alternate universe of ghosts after a spirit guides them to find the "Ghost Book" at a mysterious second-hand bookstore. During the middle of the COVID-19 pandemic in 2020—two years before the film's premiere—the production team contacted Gen Hoshino with a request to write the film's theme song. They asked that the song represent the otherworld explored by the characters in the movie, but still remain accessible to a wider audience.

"I Wanna Be Your Ghost"
The first chorus to "I Wanna Be Your Ghost". The song has a J-pop and dance music sound with electronic instrumentation. In the lyrics, Hoshino sings of connecting the worlds of humans and ghosts.

Musically, "I Wanna Be Your Ghost" is a J-pop and dance song, with a runtime of three minutes and forty-five seconds (3:45). The song was written, arranged, and produced by Hoshino, who programmed and co-arranged it with recurring collaborator Mabanua. Apart from vocals, the song's instrumentation consists solely of electronic instruments: electric bass, Rhodes piano, and Clavinet (performed by Mabanua); fourteen types of analog synthesizer (Hoshino, Mabanua, and Tadataka Unno); theremin (Hoshino and Mabanua); and electric guitar (Ryosuke Nagaoka). It was recorded by Mabanua, Shojiro Watanabe, and Shu Saida. Mixing was handled by Watanabe and mastering by Takahiro Uchida. Satoshi Goto and Hiroshi Manabe are credited with assistance.

Lyrically, Hoshino sings of connecting the worlds of humans and ghosts; in a press release, he said that he wanted "I Wanna Be Your Ghost" to break the barriers of different worlds and allow humans and ghosts to dance together. A reporter for Oricon wrote that the scary-but-funny theme of Yokaipedia is followed in the song, in which Hoshino sings "Obake ga deru zo" (transl. "Ghosts will emerge"). (Note: English lyrics adapted from Hoshino's website) The word urameshiya (lit. 'roeful') also appears in the lyrics, which signifies the emergence of ghosts. Background vocals are performed by Hoshino, Nagaoka, and voice actors Rie Kugimiya, Hiro Shimono, and Tomokazu Sugita, who portray the ghosts in the Yokaipedia film. According to Hoshino, the voice actors visited him during production, which resulted in their addition to the song's chorus. On his official website, the actors are credited under their character names.

== Release and promotion ==
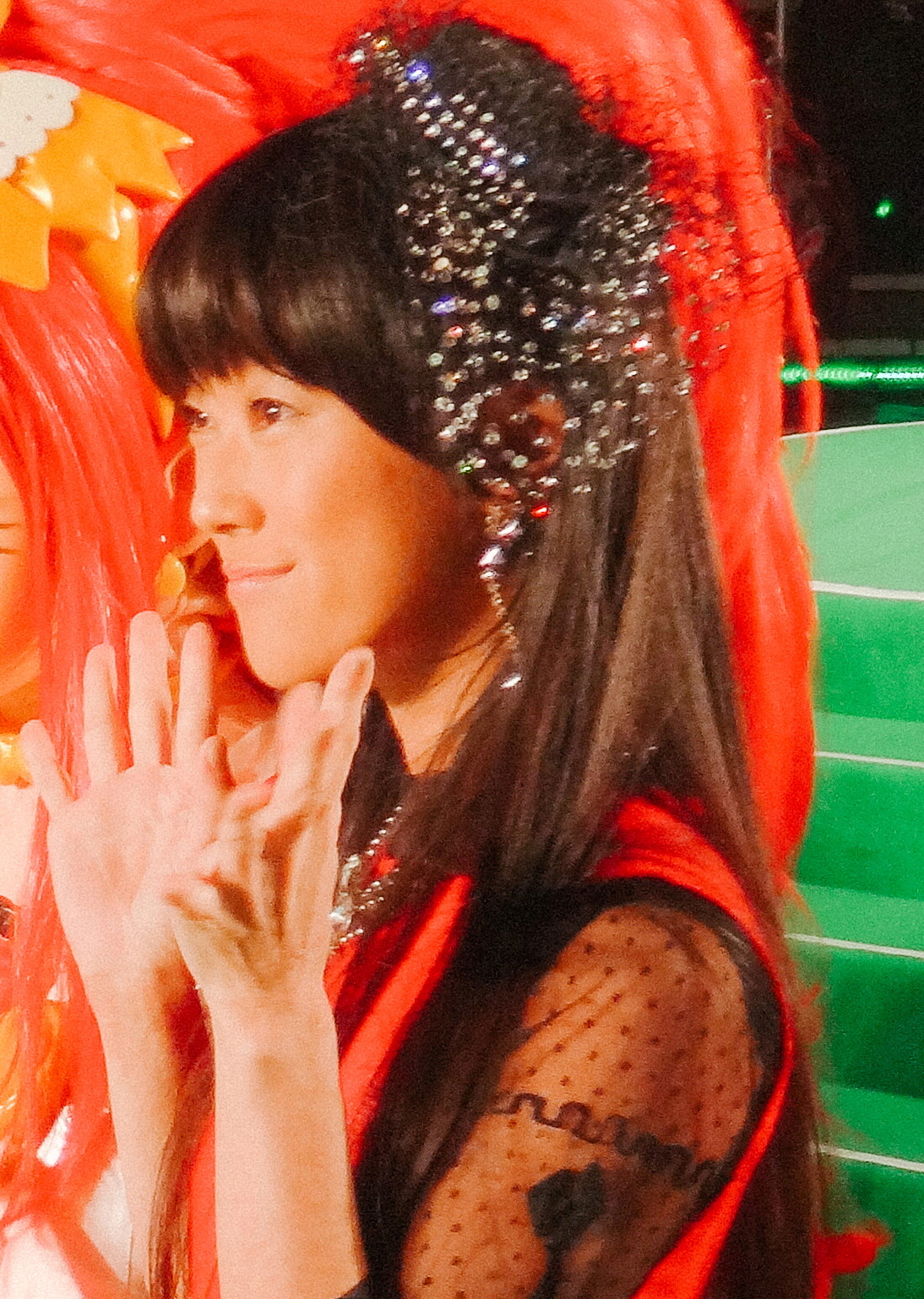
Yokaipedia voice actors Rie Kugimiya (pictured in 2013), Hiro Shimono, and Tomokazu Sugita provided background vocals for "I Wanna Be Your Ghost" and appeared on Hoshino's radio show.

Alongside its announcement on May 25, 2022, "I Wanna Be Your Ghost" was showcased in a trailer over scenes from Yokaipedia. On July 13, Hoshino announced that the song would be released as single, and two days later unveiled its cover art: a mixture of illustrations onto a real-life photograph. "I Wanna Be Your Ghost" was released as a digital-exclusive single by the Victor Entertainment subsidiary Speedstar Records on July 18, 2022, four days before the premiere of Yokaipedia. To promote the release, Kugimiya, Shimono, and Sugita – the film voice actors featured in the song's background vocals – were announced as guests for the July 26 broadcast of Hoshino's All Night Nippon radio program. Yokaipedia marked Hoshino's first on-screen appearance with his wife Yui Aragaki since their marriage in 2021, since Aragaki portrays the film protagonist's schoolteacher.

The animated music video to "I Wanna Be Your Ghost" was one of the earliest projects of animation studio Outline, headed by director Yūki Igarashi, noted by Natalie.mu writers for his work on the ending visual to the first season of the anime series Jujutsu Kaisen (2020–23). The music video was premiered at 0:00 JST on the day of the song's release, following a teaser of a dancing ghost released alongside the single's announcement on July 13. The full video sees a young boy dancing with ghosts. It was both directed and storyboarded by Igarashi, who handled character design with animation director Huang Chieh. The video was praised by animation journalist Tadashi Sudo of industry publication Animation Business, who wrote that it evokes the feeling of youth through simple lines/color and "appealing" choreography. The choreography, handled by Shingo Okamoto and Elevenplay dance troupe member NON, attracted popularity from TikTok users who replicated its dance.

== Reception ==
"I Wanna Be Your Ghost" was met with positive reviews from Japanese music critics, who primarily noted its music production. Writers for Rhythm & Drums Magazine thought that the song features feelings of detail, human power, and a "pleasant" hi-hat within the programmed drums. Barks's Fumiaki Amano described it as a charming song that would make listeners want to dance along. Despite the wide arrange of equipment used in its recording, Amano found the composition to have a "simple groove" that showcases a classic style in Hoshino's writing of blending pop with a sharp edge. Both lyrically and musically, the song drew comparisons to Hoshino's preceding single "Comedy" (2022). The writers for Rhythm & Drums Magazine thought that "I Wanna Be Your Ghost" provided a different programming style to "Comedy"; meanwhile, Amano thought both songs were similar for demonstrating imagination. He theorized that lines on "I Wanna Be Your Ghost" could be an attempt by Hoshino to convey the hope brought to him by creating: "Nageku tami ni / Tayō no kami ni / Iki zumaru kono chikyū ni / Kimi ga tsukuri bake deru" (transl. "Both mourners and gods exist / Breaking out of this stifled Earth / You create and ghosts come pouring out").

Commercially, the song received 12,539 paid digital downloads in Japan upon release. Thus, it opened at first place on both the Oricon Digital Singles and Billboard Japan's Top Download Songs charts. On the Japan Hot 100, the song charted for five weeks and peaked at number six during its opening week, whereas it reached number twenty-six on the Oricon Combined Singles Chart with two total chart weeks. "I Wanna Be Your Ghost" was reported by Billboard to be the most-aired song on Japanese radio upon its release, but saw less successful immediate streaming numbers with a peak at number sixty-four on the Top Streaming Songs chart.

== Live performances ==
Hoshino gave a debut performance of "I Wanna Be Your Ghost" alongside "Fushigi" (2021) and "Comedy" in August 2022 via Spotify's Go Stream video series, directed by Kyōtarō Hayashi (who had previously worked with Hoshino on some of his music videos). The series was filmed in a small room with Hoshino and his supporting musicians, under the concept of creating a private feeling. Subsequently, Hoshino included the song on his timeslot for the CDTV Live! Live! Christmas special at the end of 2022, and performed it as the final song of his Reassembly tour in January 2023, which celebrated the opening of physical venues after the COVID-19 pandemic. During Reassembly, Hoshino performed the song as his alter ego character Akira Nise in sparkling suit; it concluded with confetti tape shot across the stage as Nise struck a pose, before departing. Nise's cover was described as comical in style by Natalie.mu writers; Billboard Japan's Rumi Miyamoto and live reviewers for Barks dubbed the live version "feat. Nise" instead of "feat. Ghosts".

In what Hoshino described as his first time properly performing the song live, it was most recently featured at the Summer Sonic Festival on August 17, 2024, where he performed the urameshiya pose (putting one's hands to around the neck level and letting them hang slightly) in conjunction with the chorus.

== Personnel ==
Music and production credits adapted from Hoshino's website; video personnel taken from the Music Video Tour 2: 2017–2022 credits booklet.

Production and musicians

- Gen Hoshino – songwriting, arrangement, vocals, background vocals, analog synthesizer, (Note: Types of analog synthesizer played by Hoshino: Sequential Prophet-5, Yamaha DX7, Roland Juno-6, Roland Jupiter-8, Oberheim OB-Xa, Minimoog, Oberheim Matrix-12, PPG Wave 2.0, Emulator II, Casio CZ-101, Buchla Music Easel, Waldorf STVC) synthesizer, theremin, programming, producer
- Mabanua – co-arrangement, electric bass, Rhodes piano, analog synthesizer, (Note: Types of analog synthesizer played by Mabanua: Yamaha DX7, Roland Juno-6, Roland Jupiter-8, Oberheim OB-Xa, Minimoog, Korg MS-20) synthesizer, electric clavichord (Clavinet), theremin, programming, recording
- Tadataka Unno – analog synthesizer (Waldorf STVC, Oberheim Two-Voice Pro)
- Ryosuke Nagaoka – electric guitar, background vocals, background vocals arrangement
- Rie Kugimiya (as Book Boy) – background vocals
- Hiro Shimono (as Ittan-momen) – background vocals
- Tomokazu Sugita (as Yamabiko) – background vocals
- Shojiro Watanabe – recording, mixing
- Shu Saida – recording
- Takahiro Uchida – mastering
- Satoshi Goto – assistance
- Hiroshi Manabe – assistance

Music video staff

- Yūki Igarashi – director, storyboard, character design
- Huang Chieh – animation director, character design
- NON (Elevenplay) – choreography
- Shingo Okamoto – choreography
- Tsutomu Kasai – animation producer
- Kensuke Hosokawa – animation producer
- Keiko Yamaji – production support
- Takafumi Nakame – production support
- Hyuga Yamamura – associate producer

== Charts ==
Weekly chart performance for "I Wanna Be Your Ghost" (2022)
Chart (2022)	Peak position
Japanese Combined Singles (Oricon)	26
Japan Hot 100 (Billboard Japan)	6

== Release history ==
Release dates and formats for "I Wanna Be Your Ghost"
Region	Date	Format(s)	Label	Catalogue code	Ref.
Various	July 18, 2022	Digital download; streaming	Speedstar Records	VE3WA-19785	
South Korea	July 21, 2022	Digital download; streaming	J-Box Entertainment	—N/a	
