= Cube (song) =

Single by Gen Hoshino
- Language: Japanese
- Released: October 18, 2021
- Length: 3:25
- Label: Speedstar
- Songwriters: Gen Hoshino; Mabanua
- Producer: Gen Hoshino

Gen Hoshino singles chronology
| "Fushigi" / "Create" (2021) | "Cube" (2021) | "Comedy" (2022) |

Music video
- "Cube" on YouTube

"Cube" (Japanese pronunciation: [kʲɯꜜːbɯ]) is a song by Japanese singer-songwriter and musician Gen Hoshino, released as a digital-exclusive single by Speedstar Records on October 18, 2021. It was written and produced by Hoshino, who co-arranged and programmed it with Mabanua. Written for the 2021 film of the same name – a remake of the 1997 Canadian thriller – "Cube" was inspired by a sense of anger Hoshino felt in the original. Its instrumentation primarily consists of bass, organ, guitar, and programmed drums, drawing influence from alternative rock, punk, soul, and gospel. Lyrically, it compares the world to an inescapable cube and includes references to the film, with later lines introducing a more hopeful message.

"Cube" was first previewed in a trailer over film clips upon its announcement. Hoshino promoted the song alongside the remake's lead actor Masaki Suda, appearing on each other's segments of the radio program All Night Nippon and co-starring in an interview released to film distributor Shochiku's YouTube channel. The song was received positively by music critics, who praised the composition as unpredictable and compared its beat to "Create". Upon release, "Cube" reached numbers four and 25 on Billboard Japan's Hot 100 and the Oricon Combined Singles Charts, respectively. It reached second place on both Oricon and Billboard's digital download charts, and held two consecutive weeks atop Plantech's airplay ranking. The black-and-white music video is the directorial debut of choreographer Mikiko, and features a cameo from Suda.

== Development ==
"Cube" was written by Hoshino for a 2021 Japanese remake of the 1997 Canadian thriller film of the same name. Its plot follows a group of six who find themself trapped in a maze-like cube, laced with death traps. After the original film achieved cult status in Japan upon its local release, a remake by Manriki (2019) director Yasuhiko Shimizu was announced in February 2021, with a slated release of October 22, 2021. Hoshino's theme song was announced on September 15, with a preview in a trailer over film scenes. It was his first song written for a film in around three years, following his single "Doraemon" for Doraemon: Nobita's Treasure Island (2018).

=== Writing and lyrics ===
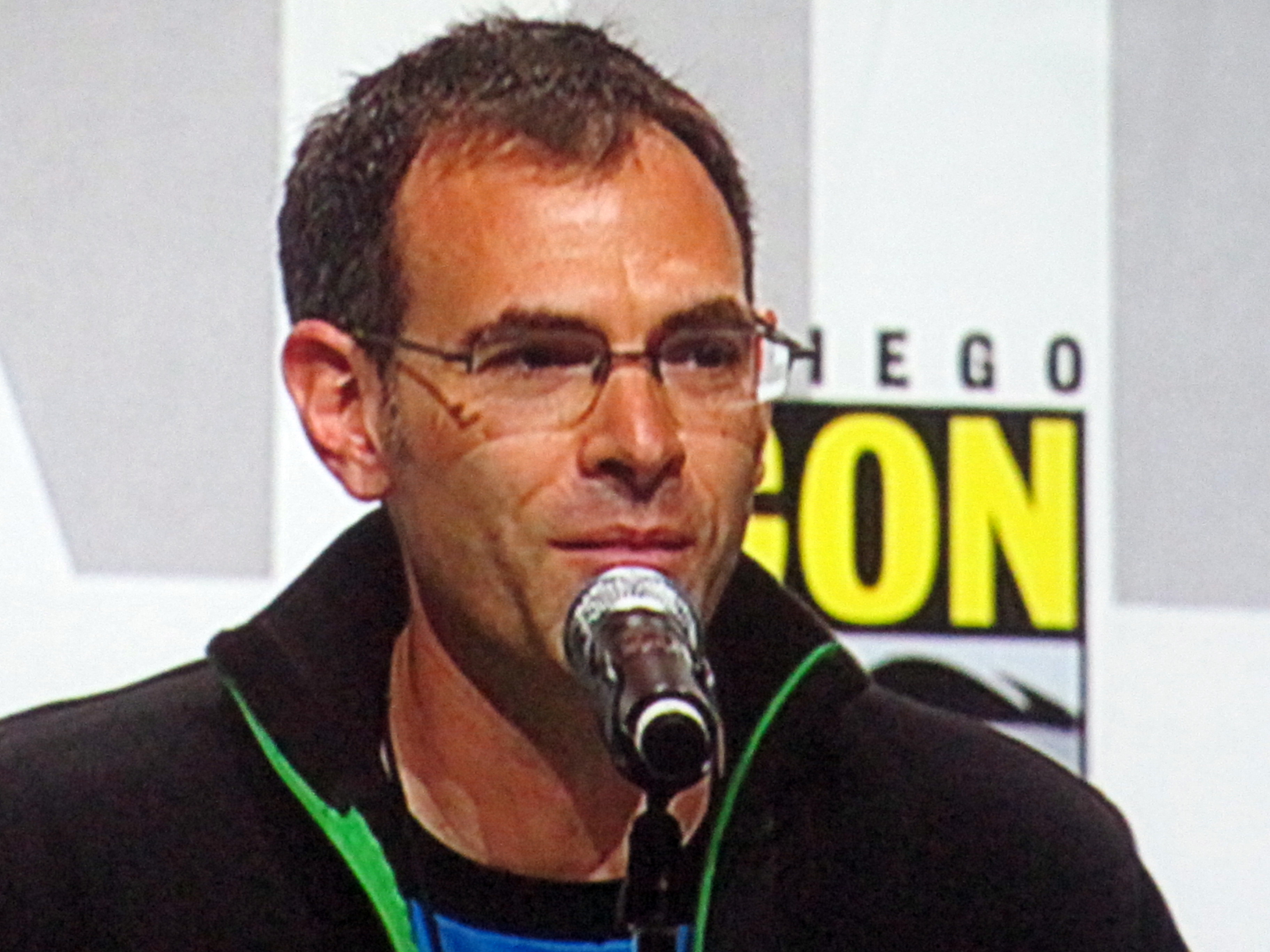
After receiving the offer, Hoshino watched the original 1997 Cube (director Vincenzo Natali pictured in 2010) and the Japanese remake. He was inspired by what he called an anger towards people and society in the original.

Hoshino noted that he had never written a song for the psycho-thriller genre and saw "Cube" as an opportunity to use his music for a new style. After receiving the offer, he first watched the original 1997 film and then the Japanese remake. Hoshino resonated with the original, sensing a strong sense of anger towards mankind and society. He thought that anger would become the song's keyword and tried to create an "explosion of that [feeling]". With this as the base, he was quickly able summarize his idea for the lyrics; musically, he thought he would be able to create something new to him.

Since the song would be used in the end roll, Hoshino aimed to avoid creating a horror style and instead wished for something that would surpass the film itself. Building on his interpretation of the 1997 film, the lyrics to "Cube" represents Earth through a cube and sings of being trapped inside: "How about we step out into the light? / The cube just turned out to be a sphere". Hoshino demonstrates a more hopeful message in later lines such as "While laughing off the brevity of life / Just let me dance". The text includes links to the movie, such as in the final line "We're always gonna be stuck in this endless absurdity", which is adapted from a quote in the 1997 film. Hoshino imagined that film viewers would think he is singing from the perspective of the characters, so added the line "I saw this in a Canadian movie way back when" to dismiss the perspective since the original film doesn't exist within the remake's universe.

Parts of the lyrics are influenced by lead actor Masaki Suda's performance in the film, which Hoshino enjoyed for its vitality. Friends since earlier, Suda was the only person shown the song before the release of the trailer. Hoshino told Model Press that he was glad to have worked with Suda; though they previously co-starred as adversaries on the television drama MIU404 (2020), their characters rarely interacted.

=== Production ===
The production on "Cube" continues changes in Hoshino's style debuted with his previous singles "Create" and "Fushigi" (2020), taking use of electric keyboard and a digital audio workstation. Alike "Create", Hoshino worked on the song's programming with musician Mabanua. Hoshino would send his programming to Mabanua, who would alter it and then send the track back to Hoshino, repeating this process until the song was finished. Hoshino enlisted the help of long-time collaborator and guitarist Ryosuke Nagaoka for arrangement of the chorus vocals, who completed the process in one day.

Hoshino first created a 16-bars-like drum pattern for the intro, which would lead the development of the sound. He wanted to maintain the "innocence" of his initial ideas and stuck with the beat throughout the entire production process without alternation. Though programmed, the original sound aimed to replicate live instrumentation and didn't feature electronic elements. Hoshino considered adjusting the drums to a human level, but decided against this and set it to sound like a "drummer with four legs and six arms". He settled on a minimal instrumental line-up of drums, bass, organ, and electric guitar to fit his perception of a progressive and manic sound. Similarly to the drums, Hoshino described the organ playstyle as that of a "four-armed" musician. He incorporated elements from punk and alternative rock such as a warped guitar, and on the drumming drew from 1960s to 70s soul music and the type of gospel he thought could be played in a countryside church.

== Composition ==
"Cube"
The first chorus to "Cube". Featuring instrumentation of organ, electric bass, guitar, and programmed drums, its sound was described as unpredictable by music critics.

"Cube" is three minutes and twenty-five seconds long (3:25). Hoshino wrote and produced the track; he co-arranged and programmed it with Mabanua, who also plays electric bass. In addition the chorus arrangement, Nagaoka provided electric guitar and handclapping, the latter alongside Hoshino. Hoshino, Mabanua, and pianist Hirotaka Sakurada collaborated on the organ. Drums, bass, the organ, and guitar make up the lead instrumentation; the programmed drums consists of ride cymbal, tom drum, and snare drum. It was mixed by Shojiro Watanabe and mastered by Takahiro Uchida.

According to sheet music published by Yamaha Music Entertainment, "Cube" is set in 148 beats per minute and primarily composed within the keys of E♭ major, B♭ major, and F major, with use of A major in the final bridge. The song opens with a fast-paced drum and bass style in the intro and moves to half-time with the chorus. In the second bridge, the song fuses two-beat and eight-beat; the two-beat remains through the outro, where it is matched by the melody and rhythm.

== Release and music video ==
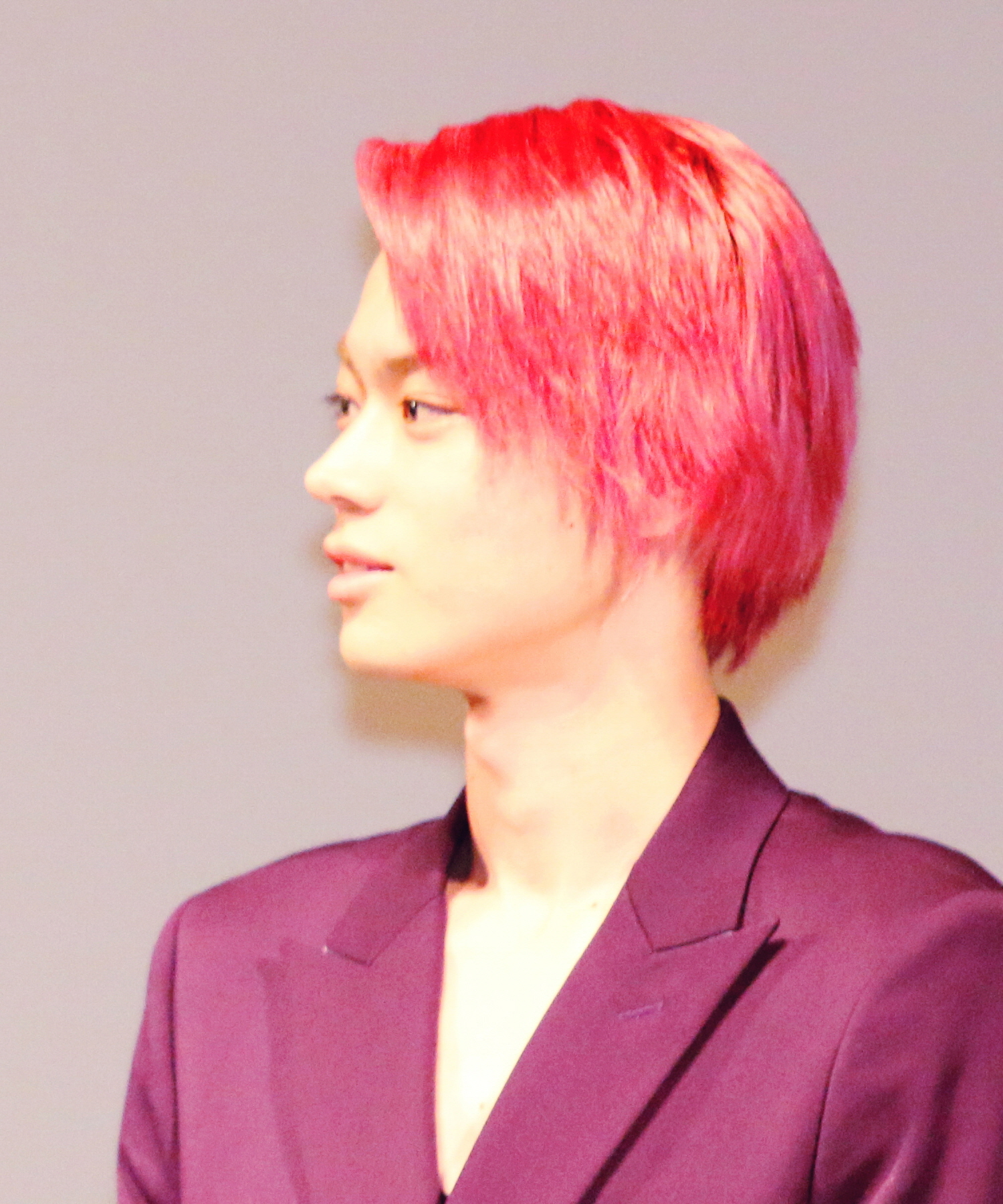
Film lead actor Masaki Suda (pictured in 2015) cameos in the music video. He and Hoshino also appeared together on radio and in an interview to promote the song and film.

On October 18, 2021, a month and three days after its announcement as the theme song to the film, "Cube" was released as a digital-exclusive single by the Victor Entertainment label Speedstar Records, after Hoshino announced the release seven days earlier. To promote the release, Hoshino collaborated with Loft's MoMA Design Store to host a raffle where listeners could win illustrations drawn by Hoshino or a cube-shaped aluminium clock. Hoshino and Suda appeared on each other's segments of the radio program All Night Nippon to promote the film, and co-starred in a video interview released to the official YouTube channel of film distributor Shochiku. Hoshino also appeared on the music radio programs Shinya no Ongaku Shokudō and Tokyo Highway Radio to discuss the song. He has not performed it live.

Choreographer Mikiko, who previously worked with Hoshino on singles like "Sun" (2015), both directed and co-choreographed the song's music video in her directorial debut, which was premiered on October 20, 2021. Filmed in monochrome, it sees Hoshino and a group of dancers performing within a studio set throughout camera cuts. Originating from a request from Hoshino, Suda makes a 15-second cameo in the video, waving his hand to Hoshino with his departure. He was told to act like "the White Rabbit in the foreign land". In their two-way interview for Shochiku, Suda recalled that he couldn't understand what was happening around him during filming but thought the final result ended up with a feeling of mystery. He noted the size of the set, remarking it was bigger than the one they used for the film itself. After the video's release, Hoshino announced that he would host his first Instagram livestream of 2021 on October 22, the same day as the Cube film premiere.

A behind-the-scenes video was released on October 29, 2021, and includes Hoshino discussing with Suda. A distorted but colored cut of the video named the VHS Version, released on the bonus second disc of Hoshino's 2023 video album Music Video Tour 2 2017-2022, shows him in a red suit with cyan tie.

== Reception ==
"Cube" was received positively by music critics in Japan, who praised its instrumentation. A writer for Rhythm & Drums Magazine called the song's beat thrilling and dramatic, describing its progression as unpredictable. They highlighted the programming work of Hoshino and Mabanua, praising the drumming as detailed and the beat as alive "to the point you could forget its programmed". Chihiro Ogawa for Rockin'On Japan called the first half of the beat unusual – "a restlessness that engulfs listeners in disorder" – but thought the sound progressed into a lighter style, highlighting the use of organ. Both critics likened the uneasy or unpredictable beat to "Create", with the Rhythm & Drums writer also tracing the style back to "Fushigi" and the Pop Virus single "Idea" (2018). Ogawa was positive of the lyrics, which she thought incorporated a wit through the line referencing the 1997 film. Alongside the development of the sound, she wrote it embodies the idea of a hopeful Hoshino song, with lines such as "While laughing off the brevity of life / Just let me dance" keeping the song away from pessimism.

Commercially, "Cube" debuted at number four on the Billboard Japan Hot 100 dated October 27, 2021, placing behind Back Number's "Suihei-sen", STU48's "Hetaretachi yo", and Lisa's "Akeboshi". A digital-exclusive release, it peaked at 25th on Oricon's Combined Singles Chart and stayed for only a single week, but performed better on the digital download component charts; it reached number two on both Oricon's Digital Singles and Billboard Japan's Top Download Songs charts, outperformed only by "Akeboshi". It was less successful in streaming, peaking at number 77 on Billboard's Streaming Songs chart. The song received significant airplay upon release, charting atop Plantech's weekly radio chart for two consecutive weeks in what the site described as a landslide.

== Personnel ==
Music and production staff adapted from Hoshino's official website; music video credits adapted from the booklet to Music Video Tour 2 2017-2022.

Musicians and production

- Gen Hoshino – vocals, background vocals, organ, handclap, programming, songwriting, arrangement, producer
- Mabanua – electric bass, organ, programming, co-arrangement
- Hirotaka Sakurada – organ
- Ryosuke Nagaoka – electric guitar, background vocals, handclap, background vocals arrangement
- Shojiro Watanabe – mixing, recording
- Takahiro Uchida – mastering
- Shigeharu Nakauchi – recording
- Shu Saida – recording
- Daiki Iimura – recording assistance
- Satoshi Goto – recording assistance

Locations

- Audio mastered at Flair Mastering Works, Tokyo 2021

Music video staff

- Mikiko – director, choreography
- Koichi Inoue – director of photography
- Gen Kaido – lighting director
- Shingo Okamoto – choreography, dancer
- Shuji Mito – production designer
- Go Takakusagi – hair and make-up for Hoshino
- Takeuchi Miyuu – hair and make-up for dancers
- Azuma – hair and make-up for Suda
- Teppei – stylist for Hoshino
- Mild – stylist for dancers and Suda
- Shogo Honda – production manager
- Hitoshi Sugai (Koe Inc.) – producer
- Takahiko Kajima (P.I.C.S.) – producer
- Gen Hoshino – cast
- Masaki Suda – cameo
- Elevenplay – dancers
- Daiki – dancer
- Kekke – dancer
- Taabow – dancer

== Charts ==
Weekly chart performance for "Cube"
| Chart (2021) | Peak position |
|---|---|
| Japan (Billboard Japan Hot 100) | 4 |
| Japanese Combined Singles (Oricon) | 25 |

== Release history ==
Release dates and formats for "Cube"
| Region | Date | Format | Label | Catalogue code | Ref(s). |
|---|---|---|---|---|---|
| Various | October 18, 2021 | Digital download; streaming | Speedstar Records | VE3WA-19398 | |
| South Korea | October 18, 2021 | Digital download; streaming | J-Box Entertainment | —N/a | |
