= Fushigi (song) =

- Digital single cover

Single by Gen Hoshino

from the album Gen
- Language: Japanese
- A-side: "Create" (double A-side)
- B-side: "Tomato"; "Dancing on the Inside" (New Year's Eve)
- Released: April 27, 2021
- Studio: Onkio Haus (Ginza); Victor (Shibuya)
- Genre: J-pop
- Length: 4:50
- Label: Speedstar
- Songwriter: Gen Hoshino
- Producer: Gen Hoshino

Gen Hoshino singles chronology
"Halfway" (2020)	"Fushigi" / "Create" (2021)	"Cube" (2021)

Alternative cover
- Double A-side cover

Music video
- "Fushigi" on YouTube

"Fushigi" (Japanese: 不思議; lit. 'Miracle') is a song by Japanese singer-songwriter and musician Gen Hoshino from his fifth studio album, Gen (2025). Speedstar Records released the song as a digital single on April 27, 2021, and later reissued it as a double A-side CD with "Create" on June 23, 2021. Hoshino wrote "Fushigi" for the television drama series Why I Dress Up for Love. He took inspiration from anime, novels, and synthesizer-heavy R&B music from the 1980s to write a heartaching song; he penned and produced the track alone, and arranged it with collaborator Mabanua. A love song, "Fushigi" is an analog synthesizer-driven J-pop ballad with elements of funk, R&B, soul, and urban contemporary music.

Reviews of "Fushigi" have complimented its interpretation of love. Some critics also noted its composition, which a few found nostalgic. Commercially, the song debuted at number two on the Billboard Japan Hot 100, and later rose to number one upon the release of the double A-side single. "Fushigi" peaked at number 71 on the Billboard Global Excl. US – Hoshino's second international chart entry – and reached number 9 on the Oricon Combined Singles Chart. The song was certified platinum by the Recording Industry Association of Japan for streaming and gold for physical sales.

Kyōtarō Hayashi directed the music video to "Fushigi", which was released on May 30, 2021. The video sees Hoshino and a dog companion going about daily life in an otherwise unpopulated world. It won Best Solo Artist Video at the 2021 MTV Video Music Awards Japan and Video of the Year at the 2022 Space Shower Music Awards. Hoshino performed "Fushigi" at various events, including the 72nd NHK Kōhaku Uta Gassen on New Year's Eve 2021, and featured it on his Reassembly tour in 2023. An acoustic arrangement of the song was used in a 2023 commercial by Kirin Brewery, which starred Hoshino and actress Mikako Tabe.

== Background and writing ==
Gen Hoshino's early career consisted of acoustic-centered records. From his third album Stranger (2013), he began to incorporate greater use of synthesizers and string arrangements, but continued to compose songs with the guitar. Around the start of the COVID-19 pandemic in 2020, Hoshino sought to upgrade his composition style. He found time in quarantine to practice using digital audio workstations and keyboard, aided by drummer and producer Mabanua, who gave Hoshino a lecture on digital music composition over a phone call. This resulted in the songs "Halfway" (2020) and "Create" (2021), the latter co-arranged by Mabanua.

Why I Dress Up for Love director Ayuko Tsukahara and producer Junko Arai — who had collaborated with Hoshino as an actor on the series MIU404 (2020) — worked with him as an artist on the television drama's theme song. At a briefing, Arai explained that the show would be a "heartache" and told Hoshino to create a "very touching love song". Hoshino viewed the offer as an opportunity to write a love song with intention, describing his previous attempts as unintended results. In an interview with Oricon, Hoshino said that on these previous tracks, he had always been careful to keep the lyrics fictional; however, he was encouraged to explore his own interpretation of love on "Fushigi" after finding fulfillment with autobiographical writing on tracks like "Dancing on the Inside" (2020).

"Fushigi" was written and produced by Hoshino, who co-arranged and programmed it with Mabanua. Hoshino cited various influences for the song's heartaching theme. He intersected his writing sessions with viewings of the Kyoto Animation anime series Love, Chunibyo & Other Delusions (2012–14) and Tamako Market (2013), and also mentioned reading the Okinawan novels Hadashi de Nigeru (2017) and Umi o Ageru (2020) by Yōko Uema. Sonically, he based the song around synthesizer-heavy R&B songs from the 1970–80s, like Toshinobu Kubota's "Missing" (1986) and Aska's "Hajimari wa Itsu mo Ame" (1991); Hoshino recalled hearing the intro to the former at an ice rink when in elementary school, which had brought on a feeling of heartache.

== Composition and lyrics ==
"Fushigi" has a runtime of 4 minutes and 50 seconds. The instrumentation consists of analog synthesizers (played by Hoshino, Mabanua, Hirotaka Sakurada, and manipulated by Naoyuki Honzawa), pianos (Hoshino and Sakurada), Rhodes piano (Sakurada), drums (Shun Ishiwaka), electric guitar (Ryosuke Nagaoka), and electric bass (Hama Okamoto). Shojiro Watanabe and Shigeharu Nakauchi recorded the song at Onkio Haus and Victor Studio in Tokyo, while Watanabe mixed it and Takahiro Uchida handled mastering.

"Fushigi"
The third chorus to "Fushigi". Led by warm analog synthesizers, it is a J-pop ballad with elements of funk, soul, R&B, and urban contemporary.

"Fushigi" is a mellow J-pop ballad, driven by warm analog synthesizers like the Minimoog and the Prophet-5, which are layered on top of each other. It has a "steady" funk groove according to The Quietus' Joshua Minsoo Kim, and soulful touches of R&B and urban contemporary music from the 80s to early 90s according to Azuki Ogiwara at Real Sound. Ogiwara called its keyboard composition a departure from the ensemble sound found on Hoshino's previous works like Yellow Dancer (2015) and "Koi" (2016). Emi Sugiura, writing for Rockin'On Japan, described the sound as "unrestrained", progressing from a generation of J-pop music that had prioritized universality.

Lyrically, "Fushigi" is a love song where Hoshino describes the "ineffable miracle he's grateful for experiencing", according to Kim. Sugiura called it a head-on verbalization of romance that serves as a hint to listeners.

== Release and commercial performance ==
It was announced that Hoshino would perform the theme song to Why I Dress Up for Love on March 30, 2021, but further details were withheld until its appearance on the show's first episode, broadcast on April 20. Upon the premiere, Hoshino revealed the song's title, "Fushigi", and announced that he would release it digitally as a single on April 27, 2021. On the scheduled date, the song was made available for streaming and digital download by Speedstar Records, a subsidiary of Victor Entertainment. With 41,578 downloads and enough streams to place it at number 21 on the Top Streamings Songs sub-chart, "Fushigi" debuted at number two on the Billboard Japan Hot 100 issue dated May 5, 2021, behind only "Born to Be Wild" by the boy band JO1. On the Oricon Combined Singles Chart, the song opened at number nine. Internationally, it entered the Billboard Global Excl. US at number 71 and stayed for four weeks, becoming Hoshino's second appearance on the chart after "Create" in February 2021.

"Fushigi" was re-released by Speedstar as the lead track of a double A-sided CD single on June 23, 2021, which also included "Create" and two B-sides. Two limited editions, Kansha (感謝; lit. 'Gratitude') and Enkai (宴会; lit. 'Party'), were released with Blu-ray/DVD recordings of Hoshino's online concerts of the same names. The support of 136,665 first-week CD sales from the double A-side helped "Fushigi" rise to the number one spot of the Japan Hot 100 chart dated June 30, 2021. Meanwhile, "Fushigi" / "Create" opened at number two on the Oricon Singles and Billboard Japan Top Singles Sales charts, defeated for the top spot on both by Kanjani Eight's "Hitori ni Shinai yo".

Writing for Billboard Japan, Hitoshi Kurimoto stated that "Fushigi" was "clearly" engineered as a long-hit. When it later climbed to number one of the Hot 100, Kurimoto opined that the song has a subtle quality – as opposed to an overtly catchy melody – which he thought helped it achieve longevity on the charts. On the 2021 Billboard Japan year-end charts, "Fushigi" ranked at number 50 on the Hot 100, number 25 on the Top Download Songs, and number 92 on the Top Streaming Songs; "Fushigi" / "Create" ranked at number 51 for Top Singles Sales. The song was certified platinum by the Recording Industry Association of Japan for streaming numbers exceeding 100,000,000, becoming Hoshino's first song to achieve this feat, and the double A-side was certified gold for physical sales above 100,000.

== Critical reception ==
Some music critics praised the lyrical interpretation of love on "Fushigi". Ogiwara for Real Sound wrote that the text has the "warmth of human skin", and Rockin'On Japan's Sugiura believed that Hoshino managed to create a J-pop song more personal than the norm by setting out to express the difficult yet important concept of romance. Reviewing international pop music for The Quietus, Kim found Hoshino's message endearing and called "Fushigi" the best love song of 2021; praising the vocal delivery, he wrote that the song is defined by a "poetic potency [where] not a single word is wasted".

"Fushigi" also received some positive reception for its music production. Einosuke Suzuki for Mikiki complimented its progression and use of analog synthesizers. Ogiwara and Sugiura both found parts of the song nostalgic; Ogiwara particularly attributed this to the synths, whereas Sugiura believed the track in general mixed the nostalgic quality with innovation. Ogiwara, who reviewed all four tracks on the CD single, noted "Fushigi" as contrasting to "Create"; similarly, Daisuke Sawada for Mikiki described "Fushigi" as a "smooth mellow" track, but "Create" as charming and up-beat.

== Promotion and other usage ==
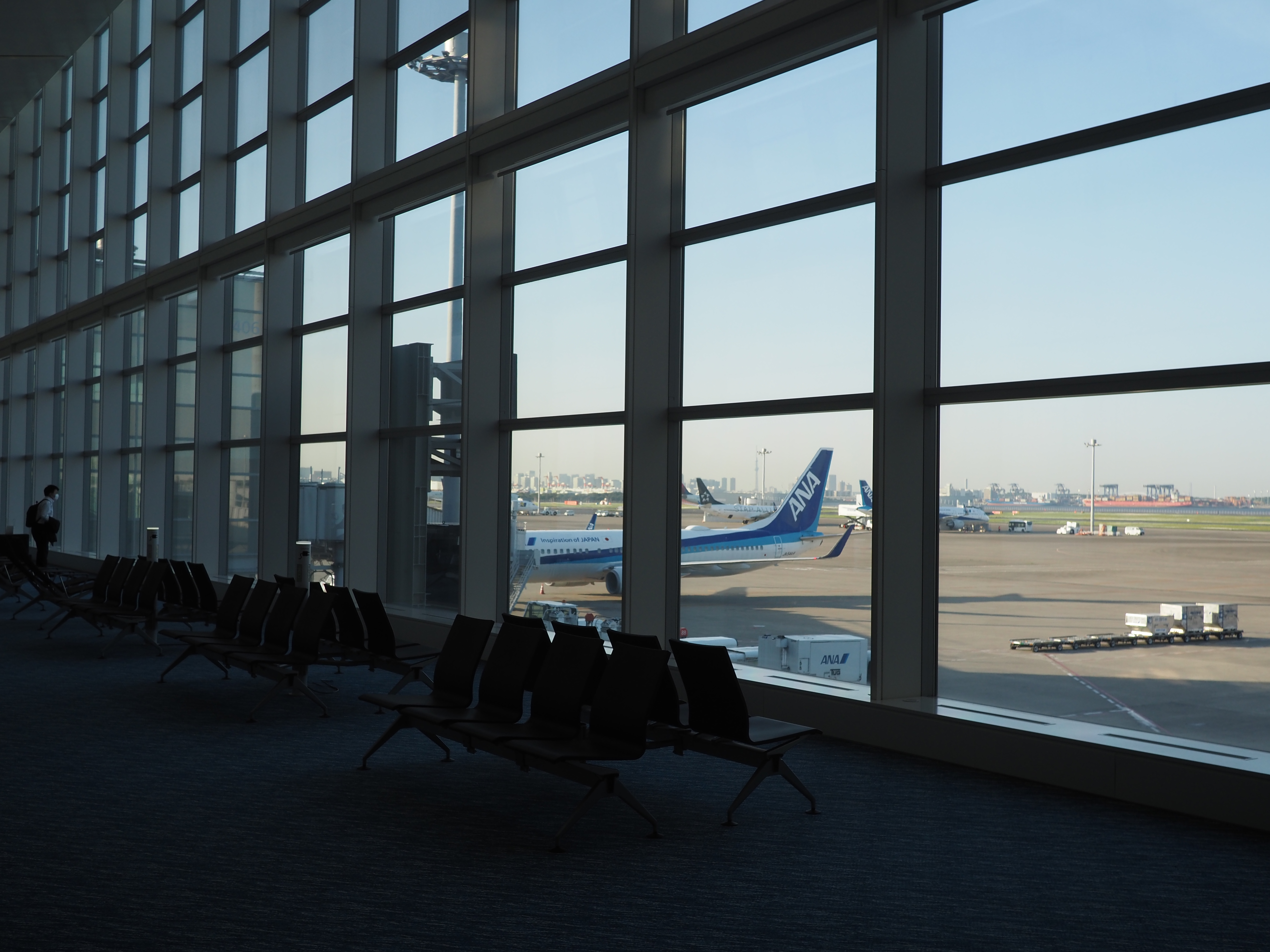
Some scenes in the "Fushigi" music video were filmed at Haneda Airport in Tokyo.

To commemorate the announcement of the song's release, Hoshino opened an official TikTok account where he posted footage of when he completed the track in a recording studio. He teased the song's music video via a snippet, and premiered the full video to YouTube on May 30, 2021. Directed by Kyōtarō Hayashi – who previously worked on the videos to Hoshino's "Pop Virus" (2018) and "Ain't Nobody Know" (2019) – it features Hoshino as he goes about daily life in a strange, unpopulated world, accompanied only by a dog companion (played by the animal actor Selene-chan). Areas featured include an airport, which was filmed at the Haneda Airport in Tokyo. Skream! reported that the video surpassed three million views within four days, and had reached 26 million views by March 2022 according to Tower Records Japan. It was the recipient of Best Solo Artist Video at the 2021 MTV Video Music Awards Japan and Video of the Year at the 2022 Space Shower Music Awards. Behind-the-scenes clips were released on June 4, 2021.

Hoshino has performed "Fushigi" during various events and concerts. He gave its debut performance via a ninety-minute special of Count Down TV on June 7, 2021, and sang the song from the Tokyo International Forum for the 72nd NHK Kōhaku Uta Gassen on New Year's Eve. In March 2022, "Fushigi" served as the penultimate number to Hoshino's second Enkai online concert, where it was arranged in a band sound. Via the video game Fortnite, he performed the song for a Soundwave Series concert in June 2022, and, in August, recorded a live video for the Spotify Go Video series, in a set that also included "Comedy" and "I Wanna Be Your Ghost" (both 2021). "Fushigi" appeared in Hoshino's Reassembly tour in January 2023; a live video of its performance from the tour's final show, held at the Yokohama Arena, was released in June.

In April 2023, an acoustic arrangement of "Fushigi" appeared in a commercial for Kirin Brewery's Green Label product line of beer. The commercial features Hoshino and actress Mikako Tabe in a lushful area, sitting on a swing within a house constructed out of ivy, as Hoshino sings and plays the song on guitar. While Natalie.mu reported that the commercial was filmed on Okinawa Island, Oricon wrote that the recording took place somewhere within Miyazaki Prefecture. Interviewed by Wired Japan, Hoshino said that he greatly enjoyed the process of rearranging one of his keyboard-composed songs using the guitar.

== Track listing ==
All tracks are written by Gen Hoshino.

Digital-only single

1. "Fushigi" – 4:50

Double A-side single — Regular edition

2. "Create" – 3:56
3. "Dancing on the Inside" (New Year's Eve) – 3:48
4. "Tomato" – 2:48

Double A-side single — First press (DVD/Blu-ray), "Enkai" edition

1. "Opening" – 1:51
2. "Kudaranai no Naka ni" – 4:48
3. "Pop Virus" – 5:03
4. "Yuge" – 5:18
5. "Kids" – 4:18
6. "Hada" – 4:25
7. "Ain't Nobody Know" – 4:53
8. "Dead Leaf" – 3:37
9. "Ranshi" – 3:56
10. "Create" – 3:04
11. "Sun" – 4:20
12. "Doraemon" – 4:16
13. "Sakura no Mori" – 6:34
14. "Enkai (Uchiage)"
15. "Enkai Documentary"

Double A-side single — First press (DVD/Blu-ray), "Kansha" edition

1. "Opening" – 1:31
2. "Pop Virus" – 4:27
3. "Why Don't You Play in Hell? – 4:02
4. "Yuge" – 4:10
5. "Step" – 3:22
6. "Sakura no Mori" – 6:22
7. "Hada" – 4:25
8. "Ain't Nobody Know" – 4:11
9. "Halfway" – 3:11
10. "Rōfūfu" – 2:25
11. "Mirai" – 3:52
12. "Dancing on the Inside" – 2:25
13. "Purin" – 1:37
14. "Crazy Crazy" – 3:42
15. "Sun" – 4:05
16. "Koi" – 4:13
17. "Same Thing" – 3:32
18. "Hello Song" – 4:42
19. "Watashi" – 3:42
20. "Gratitude Documentary"

== Credits and personnel ==
Credits adapted from "Fushigi" / "Create" on Hoshino's official website

Instruments

- Gen Hoshino – lead vocals, background vocals, synthesizer (Yamaha DX7), analog synthesizer (Minimoog, Prophet-5), piano
- Mabanua – analog synthesizer (Minimoog, Prophet-5)
- Hirotaka Sakurada – synthesizer (DX7), analog synthesizer (Juno-6), piano, digital piano (Rhodes)
- Shun Ishiwaka – drums
- Hama Okamoto – electric bass
- Ryosuke Nagaoka – electric guitar, background vocals

Production

- Gen Hoshino – songwriting, production, arrangement, background vocal arrangement, programming
- Mabanua – co-arrangement, programming
- Ryosuke Nagaoka – background vocal arrangement
- Naoyuki Honzawa – analog synth manipulation
- Shojiro Watanabe – mix, recording
- Shigeharu Nakauchi – recording
- Shu Saida – recording assistance
- Ro Heikun – recording assistance
- Takahiro Uchida – mastering

Locations

- Recorded at Onkio Haus (Ginza) and Victor Studio (Shibuya)
- Mastered at Flair Mastering Works (Shibuya)

Music video — Produced with Koe Inc. and Dash

- Kyōtarō Hayashi – direction
- Yuichiro Fujishiro – photography direction
- Daisuke Sakurai – photography direction
- Naoto Tanoue – lighting direction
- Ayato Yotsuya – production management
- Hitoshi Sugai – production
- Yūta Mutō – production
- Kenichi Sasaki – online editing
- Takakusagi Go – hair, make-up
- Teppei – styling
- Gen Hoshino – cast
- Selene – cast

== Charts ==
=== Weekly charts ===
Weekly chart performance for "Fushigi" (2021)
Chart (2021)	Peak position
Global Excl. US (Billboard)	71
Japan (Billboard Japan Hot 100)	1
Japanese Combined (Oricon)	9

=== Year-end charts ===
Year-end chart performance for "Fushigi" (2021)
Chart (2021)	Position
Japan (Billboard Japan Hot 100)	50

== Certifications ==
Certifications for "Fushigi"
Region	Certification	Certified units/sales
Japan (RIAJ) For "Fushigi" / "Create"	Gold	157,686 (Note: Japanese CD sales for "Fushigi" / "Create" as of January 2024, compiled by Oricon from the single's chart history.)
Streaming
Japan (RIAJ)	Platinum	100,000,000^{†}
^{†} Streaming-only figures based on certification alone.

== See also ==
- List of Hot 100 number-one singles of 2021 (Japan)
