= Create (song) =

- Digital single cover

Single by Gen Hoshino

from the album Gen
- Language: Japanese; English
- A-side: "Fushigi" (double A-side)
- B-side: "Tomato"; "Dancing on the Inside" (New Year's Eve)
- Released: February 17, 2021
- Studio: Onkio Haus (Ginza); Victor (Shibuya)
- Genre: J-pop; progressive pop; soul
- Length: 3:56
- Label: Speedstar
- Songwriter: Gen Hoshino
- Producer: Gen Hoshino

Gen Hoshino singles chronology
"Halfway" (2020)	"Fushigi" / "Create" (2021)	"Cube" (2021)

Music video
- "Create" on YouTube

"Create" (Japanese: 創造, Hepburn: Sōzō) is a song by Japanese singer-songwriter and musician Gen Hoshino from his fifth studio album, Gen (2025). The theme song to the 35th anniversary of the Nintendo video game Super Mario Bros. (1985), the song first appeared in a June 2020 commercial. Speedstar Records released it as a digital single on February 17, 2021, before a physical double A-sided CD with "Fushigi" was issued on June 23, 2021. Inspired by Nintendo's creative philosophy, Hoshino wrote and produced the track, and co-arranged it with Mabanua. A J-pop, progressive pop, and soul song, the lyrics sees Hoshino encouraging listeners to create. It features several references to Nintendo, such as the start-up jingle to their GameCube console, sound effects from Super Mario Bros., and homages to the company's history.

Critics thought that "Create" showed respect for Nintendo; they also commented on its J-pop composition and Hoshino's lyricism. The song reached number 7 on the Billboard Japan Hot 100, number 10 on the Oricon Combined Singles Chart, and number 94 on the Billboard Global Excl. US. The song has received two gold certifications from the Recording Industry Association of Japan: one for 50 million streams, and another for 100,000 CD sales as a double A-side with "Fushigi".

Yoshiyuki Okuyama directed the music video for "Create" using camera methods that included an iPhone and 8mm film. The video sees Hoshino singing and moving around; its editing and Hoshino's movements interact with the references to Nintendo in the song's lyrics and composition. Hoshino has performed the song during television appearances and concerts. On New Year's Eve 2025, it was performed from the Nintendo Museum for the 76th NHK Kōhaku Uta Gassen, with a special appearance from Koji Kondo, the original composer of Super Mario Bros.

== Background and release ==
From his time with the instrumental band Sakerock (2005–15), Japanese singer-songwriter and musician Gen Hoshino composed all of his songs using the guitar and, by his own admission, only knew how to play piano with his pointer finger. However, exclusively using guitar made it difficult for Hoshino to create music inspired by the jazz his parents listened to when he was young; he also believed it created habits that made his songs less distinguishable from each other. When most of his plans for 2020 were postponed or canceled due to the COVID-19 pandemic, he found time in self-quarantining to practice using digital audio workstations (DAWs) and keyboards, aided by producer and drummer Mabanua, who gave him a lecture on digital music composition over a phone call. Using DAWs, Hoshino produced and recorded from his home the entirety of the song "Halfway", which was released as a single on June 19, 2020.

On June 4, 2020, video game company Nintendo began airing a commercial for the 35th anniversary of Super Mario Bros. (1985). The commercial, directed by Santa Yamagishi, featured Hoshino performing his new song, "Create", on guitar, marimba, and drums in a recording studio. Several outlets later called it the theme song to the anniversary celebrations. (Note: Attributed to Natalie.mu, 4Gamer.net, and Oricon) On February 12, 2021, Hoshino announced that "Create" would be released as a single and posted a teaser from its music video. Speedstar Records, a label under Victor Entertainment, released the song five days later for download and streaming.

A double A-sided single containing "Create", Hoshino's next song "Fushigi", and two B-sides, was released to physical formats on June 23, 2021. Limited editions, titled Kansha (感謝; lit. 'Gratitude') and Enkai (宴会; lit. 'Party'), came with Blu-ray/DVDs of Hoshino's online concerts of the same names. As part of both "Create" and the double A-side's promotion, Victor held give-away raffles for stickers based on their respective cover art. Alongside the physical edition of "Fushigi" / "Create", users who downloaded the single on Line Music were awarded stamps for use in Line Messenger depicting Hoshino and his alter ego character Akira Nise, illustrated by manga artist Bkub Okawa.

== Writing ==
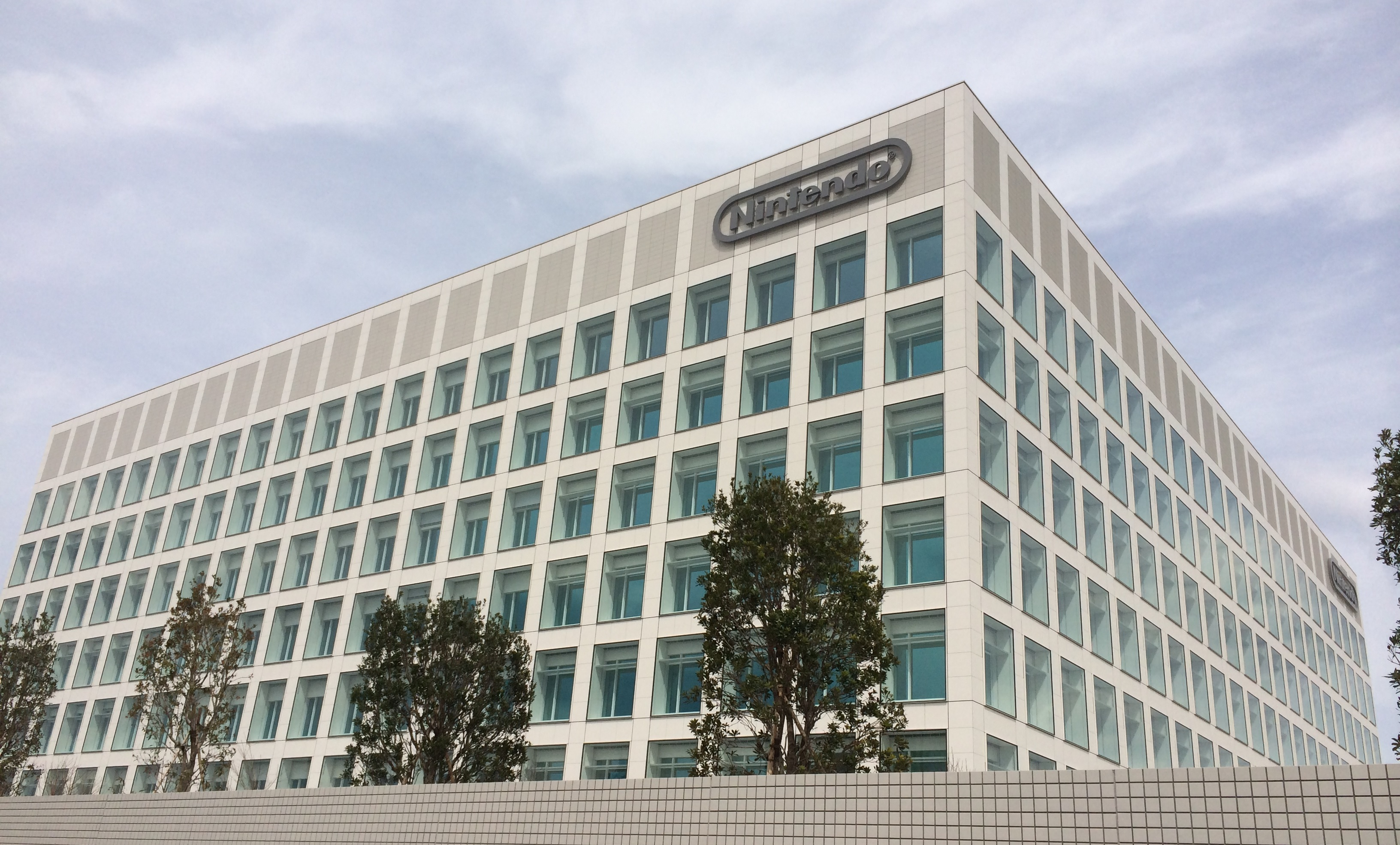
"Create" was inspired by the creative philosophy of Nintendo (headquarters pictured, 2014).

"Create" was written and produced by Hoshino, who arranged and programmed it with Mabanua. The version that appeared in the anniversary commercial had been completed by February 2020, prior to Hoshino learning DAWs. After finishing "Halfway", he worked on a remix of "Good in Bed" for Dua Lipa's Club Future Nostalgia (2020), and then began to rearrange "Create" using keyboards. Due to the lack of live performances in his schedule as a result of the pandemic, Hoshino felt able to focus his energy on writing and meticulously crafting the song over a two-to-three month period.

"Create" was imagined by Hoshino as a high-tension track that would shock listeners and serve as a challenge to his keyboard skills. As the theme to the Super Mario Bros. anniversary, he wrote it about his own perspective on creativity, influenced by that of Nintendo. He penned lyrics about the importance of messing around, which he considered as essential to humanity as eating and sleeping. Originally, Hoshino intended to title the song "Dokusō" (独創; lit. 'Originality')—a motto used and plastered in offices by Nintendo founder Fusajiro Yamauchi—but opted for the broader "Create" (創造, Sōzō) to avoid classification as a shaka (song used by a company to boost worker morale).

Analog synthesizers were used to theme the music on "Create" around the 8-bit world of the 1985 Super Mario Bros., which was the first video game Hoshino played. He scheduled a day as "Mario session" to jam melodies, songs, and sound effects from Super Mario and other Nintendo games, since he felt these sounds would need to be formally incorporated into the song's instrumentation and not sampled. Among the sounds practiced was the start-up jingle to the GameCube console and the World 1-1 theme from Super Mario Land (1989), which Hoshino told Real Sound in an interview were the most fun to rearrange.

== Composition and lyrics ==
"Create"
A J-pop song, "Create" was described by a reviewer as fast-paced soul mixed with chiptune. The track incorporates various references to Nintendo, such as a vibraphone arrangement of the start-up jingle to their GameCube console.

"Create" runs for 3 minutes and 56 seconds. Its instrumentation includes analog synthesizers (played by Hoshino and Mabanua), piano (Hirotaka Sakurada), digital piano (Hoshino, Mabanua, Sakurada), electric guitar (Ryosuke Nagaoka), drums (Tom Tamada), electric clavichord (Sakurada), vibraphone (Hoshino), contrabass (Wataru Iga), and cowbell (Mabanua). Noriyasu Kawamura plays the surigane —a Japanese bell instrument—and Hoshino additionally provides handclapping and stomping sounds, the former alongside Mabanua. The song was recorded by Shojiro Watanabe and Shigeharu Nakauchi at Onkio Haus and Victor Studio, mixed by Watanabe, and mastered by Takahiro Uchida at Flair Mastering Works.

The single version of "Create" opens with a lyrical section in English, which is replaced with an analog synth intro on the Gen (2025) album, alongside other changes to the mix. Upbeat, "Create" is a programmed J-pop song that progresses with breakbeat-esque drumming. According to Ondarock's Vassilios Karagianni, it is a progressive pop track with "a flood of crazy synths, [...] drums, breaks, and reprises". Rockin'On Japan's Tomohiro Ogawa described the track as high-tempo soul, like a broken metronome, mixed with 8-bit music that sounds like three minutes of Mario "flashing and B-dashing with a Super Star". In the lyrics, Hoshino calls for listeners to create something that defies common sense. He encourages them to play around and continue learning, despite the increasingly "stagnant" world.

Both musically and lyrically, "Create" incorporates several references to Super Mario and Nintendo. These include a vibraphone arrangement of the GameCube start-up melody, the power-up sound that plays when Mario obtains a Super Mushroom, the stage music from Super Mario Land, and the sound of shooting a fireball; according to Hoshino, the lattermost is used as a percussion. With the word directly (直接, chokusetsu), he references a pose used by late Nintendo president Satoru Iwata during Nintendo Directs. Hoshino hints towards Nintendo's time as a hanafuda manufacturer in the line "Hold the flowers and cards I've been dealt", and uses the phrase "yellow magic" as a dual reference to both the yellow game cartridges of the Famicom and the electronic music band Yellow Magic Orchestra. (Note: Yellow Magic Orchestra member Haruomi Hosono has had significant influence on Hoshino's career. He was a key inspiration in the forming of Sakerock and the reason for Hoshino learning the marimba. After they were acquainted at a 2007 music festival, Hosono assisted in launching Hoshino's solo career.) Other parts of the lyrics touch on Hoshino's diagnosis with a subarachnoid hemorrhage in 2012; he compares his eventual recovery to the life system from Super Mario Bros. in the lines "I was reborn / My billionth fresh restart" and "I returned from the brink of death / The meaning of life is to play with life itself".

== Reception ==
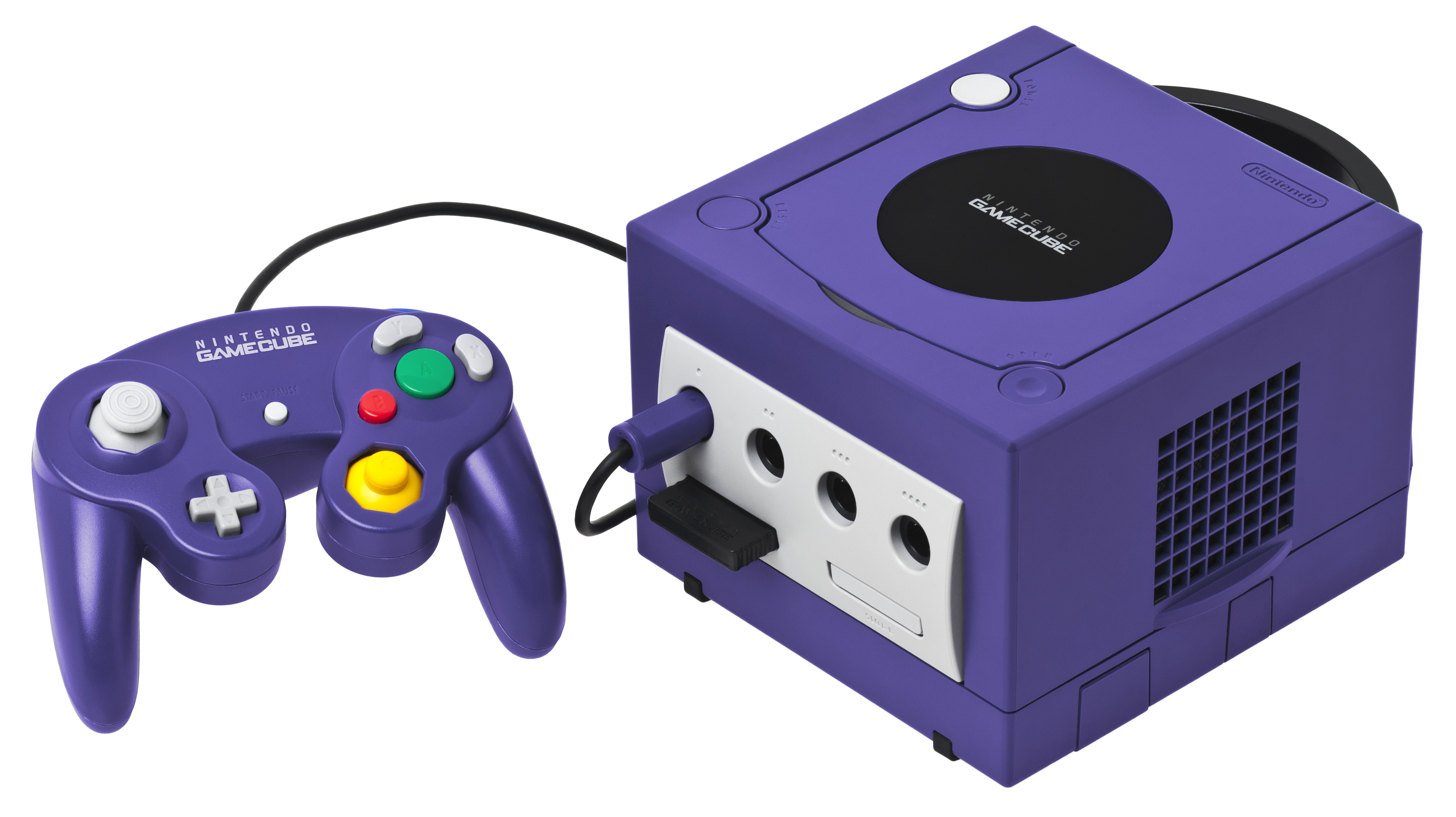
One critic highlighted the song's vibraphone arrangement of the GameCube start-up jingle (console pictured).

Critics thought that "Create" showed Hoshino's respect for Nintendo; Azuki Ogiwara at Real Sound thought that the references in the song conveyed his deep resonation with the company's creative philosophy. Game journalist Shirokawa, writing for the video game magazine Famitsu, noted that Hoshino had previously incorporated melodies from the manga franchise Doraemon in its namesake song "Doraemon" (2018), and concluded that "Create" similarly comes across with his feelings for Super Mario and Nintendo.

Composition-wise, Rockin'On Japan's Emi Sugiura viewed "Create" as a return to fundamental J-pop music and wrote that its lyrics on creativity proved Hoshino as a pop scene frontrunner. Ogiwara found the musical development to be "hectic"; she praised the lyrics for including varied ideas and described the multi-instrumental composition as imaginative. She highlighted the vibraphone performance of the GameCube jingle, which she wrote had an "unexpressable, otherworldy feel". The lyrics on "Create" were interpreted by some critics as both a personal anecdote from Hoshino and encouraging to listeners. Ryūtarō Amano, for the web magazine Mikiki, found the song's message on creativity uplifting and the references to his hemorrhage as representative of Hoshino as an artist.

Within its week of digital release, "Create" received 45,557 paid downloads and 2.9 million streams. Also powered by that week's greatest radio airplay, it debuted at number seven on the Billboard Japan Hot 100 dated March 1, 2021. The single opened at number one on the Top Download Songs chart, where it dethroned the four-week reigning "Usseewa" (2020) by singer Ado. It reached tenth on the Oricon Combined Singles Chart, a competitor to the Hot 100. At number 94, "Create" became Hoshino's first song to enter the Billboard Global Excl. US, which had been launched in September 2020. The Recording Industry Association of Japan awarded "Fushigi" / "Create" a gold certification for 100,000 physical units sold in 2021, and later a second gold certification to "Create" for surpassing 50 million streams in 2025.

== Music video ==
A first-time collaborator with Hoshino, Yoshiyuki Okuyama directed the music video to "Create" using various camera methods, including an iPhone and 8mm film. In the video, Hoshino sings as he performs various expressions and movements on top of post-production effects. The video interacts with the references to Nintendo in the music and lyrics; when the GameCube jingle is played, the screen is divided into several panels as a nod to the console's start-up visual, and Hoshino performs Iwata's pose in conjunction with the lyrics that use directly. Premiered to YouTube alongside the song's release on February 17, 2021, Musicman and Billboard Japan reported that it surpassed one million views within a day and five million views within a month. Behind-the-scenes clips were uploaded on March 4, 2021.

== Live performances ==
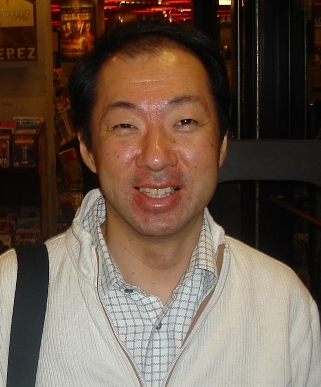
Koji Kondo (pictured 2006), the original composer of Super Mario Bros., played the series' theme during a performance of "Create" at the 76th NHK Kōhaku Uta Gassen on New Year's Eve 2025.

Hoshino performed a calmed version of "Create" during his online concert Yellow Pass Live Streaming: Enkai on March 6, 2021, which was filmed and released on the Enkai edition of the "Fushigi" / "Create" single. Before the performance, he joked to his bandmates that the song might be difficult due to its "tricky" progression, and afterwards exclaimed: "We did it! Wonderful!". On December 16, 2024, Hoshino performed a Christmas rendition of the song alongside a "Snow" version of his 2023 single "Why" for an episode of the music program CDTV Live! Live!.

Hoshino performed "Create" during Mad Hope, the headlining tour for the Gen album, throughout 2025. Prior to its performance at the Saitama Super Arena, he described it as the hardest song on the setlist. On New Year's Eve of the same year, Hoshino appeared with "Create" for a special corner at the 76th NHK Kōhaku Uta Gassen. The pre-recorded performance was shot at the Nintendo Museum in Kyoto. (Note: Hoshino and his wife Yui Aragaki had previously been invited to the museum during its pre-opening, prior to its public opening in October 2024.) According to Sports Nippon, the special was "filled with the world [of Super Mario]" as Hoshino performed various Mario jumps throughout. The song was briefly paused when Hoshino played the Super Mario Bros. theme with Koji Kondo, its original composer. In the coda, Hoshino moved to an outdoors stage decorated with show lights, before the song ended with him entering a green pipe.

== Track listing ==
All tracks are written by Gen Hoshino.

Digital-only single

1. "Create" – 3:56

Double A-side single — Regular edition

1. "Fushigi" – 4:50
2. "Create" – 3:56
3. "Dancing on the Inside" (New Year's Eve) – 3:48
4. "Tomato" – 2:48

Double A-side single — First press (DVD/Blu-ray), "Enkai" edition

1. "Opening" – 1:51
2. "Kudaranai no Naka ni" – 4:48
3. "Pop Virus" – 5:03
4. "Yuge" – 5:18
5. "Kids" – 4:18
6. "Hada" – 4:25
7. "Ain't Nobody Know" – 4:53
8. "Dead Leaf" – 3:37
9. "Ranshi" – 3:56
10. "Create" – 3:04
11. "Sun" – 4:20
12. "Doraemon" – 4:16
13. "Sakura no Mori" – 6:34
14. "Enkai (Uchiage)"
15. "Enkai Documentary"

Double A-side single — First press (DVD/Blu-ray), "Kansha" edition

1. "Opening" – 1:31
2. "Pop Virus" – 4:27
3. "Why Don't You Play in Hell? – 4:02
4. "Yuge" – 4:10
5. "Step" – 3:22
6. "Sakura no Mori" – 6:22
7. "Hada" – 4:25
8. "Ain't Nobody Know" – 4:11
9. "Halfway" – 3:11
10. "Rōfūfu" – 2:25
11. "Mirai" – 3:52
12. "Dancing on the Inside" – 2:25
13. "Purin" – 1:37
14. "Crazy Crazy" – 3:42
15. "Sun" – 4:05
16. "Koi" – 4:13
17. "Same Thing" – 3:32
18. "Hello Song" – 4:42
19. "Watashi" – 3:42
20. "Gratitude Documentary"

== Credits and personnel ==
Music and production credits adapted from "Fushigi" / "Create" on Hoshino's official website; video personnel taken from the Music Video Tour 2: 2017–2022 credits booklet

Instruments

- Gen Hoshino – lead vocals, background vocals, analog synthesizer (Prophet-5, Jupiter-8), digital piano (Rhodes), vibraphone, handclaps, stomping
- Mabanua – analog synthesizer (Jupiter-8), digital piano (Rhodes), cowbell, handclaps
- Hirotaka Sakurada – Clavinet, analog synthesizer (Jupiter-8), piano, digital piano (Nord Electro)
- Ryosuke Nagaoka – electric guitar, background vocals
- Tom Tamada – drums
- Wataru Iga – contrabass
- Noriyasu Kawamura – surigane

Production

- Gen Hoshino – songwriting, production, arrangement, arrangement of background vocals, programming
- Mabanua – co-arrangement, programming
- Sunny Boy – English translation
- Ryosuke Nagaoka – arrangement of background vocals
- Naoyuki Honzawa – analog synth manipulation
- Shojiro Watanabe – mix, recording
- Shigeharu Nakauchi – recording
- Shu Saida – recording assistance
- Daiki Iimura – recording assistance
- Takahiro Uchida – mastering

Locations

- Recorded at Onkio Haus (Ginza) and Victor Studio (Shibuya)
- Mastered at Flair Mastering Works (Shibuya)

Music video

- Yoshiyuki Okuyama – direction
- Hiroshi Okuyama – direction of photography
- Higasix – direction of lighting
- Miki Sakurai – production management
- Naoyuki Hashimoto – production design
- Wataru Watanabe – production
- Keisuke Hōman – production
- Takakusagi Go – hair, make-up
- Shōtarō Yamaguchi – styling
- Furitsuke Kagyō Air:Man – choreography
- Koyuki Sato – dancer
- Yui Kasai – dancer
- Aira Yui – dancer
- Gen Hoshino – cast

== Charts ==
Weekly chart performance for "Create" (2021)
Chart (2021)	Peak position
Global Excl. US (Billboard)	94
Japan (Billboard Japan Hot 100)	7
Japanese Combined (Oricon)	10

== Certifications ==
Certification for "Create"
Region	Certification	Certified units/sales
Japan (RIAJ) For "Fushigi" / "Create"	Gold	157,686 (Note: Japanese CD sales for "Fushigi" / "Create" as of January 2024, compiled by Oricon from the single's chart history.)
Streaming
Japan (RIAJ)	Gold	50,000,000^{†}
^{†} Streaming-only figures based on certification alone.
