= Gen (album) =

- Standard edition cover

Studio album by Gen Hoshino
- Released: May 14, 2025
- Studio: 808 (home studio)
- Length: 55:45
- Language: Japanese; English
- Label: Speedstar
- Producer: Gen Hoshino

Gen Hoshino chronology
Lighthouse (2023)	Gen (2025)

Singles from Gen
- 1. "Create" Released: February 17, 2021; 2. "Fushigi" Released: April 27, 2021; 3. "Comedy" Released: April 8, 2022; 4. "I Wanna Be Your Ghost" Released: July 18, 2022; 5. "Life" Released: August 14, 2023; 6. "Why" Released: December 27, 2023; 7. "Eureka" Released: January 28, 2025

Gen is the sixth studio album by Japanese singer-songwriter and musician Gen Hoshino. The album was released by Speedstar Records on May 14, 2025. It is Hoshino's first studio album in almost seven years following Pop Virus (2018).

== Track listing ==
Gen — Regular edition
No.	Title	Writer(s)	Length
1.	"Create" (創造, Sōzō)	Gen Hoshino	3:55
2.	"Mad Hope" (featuring Louis Cole, Sam Gendel, and Sam Wilkes)	Hoshino; Louis Cole	3:28
3.	"Star"	Hoshino	2:41
4.	"Glitch"	Hoshino	2:32
5.	"Comedy" (喜劇, Kigeki)	Hoshino	3:53
6.	"2" (featuring Lee Young-ji)	Hoshino; Lee Young-ji	2:39
7.	"Melody"	Hoshino	2:31
8.	"Fushigi" (不思議, lit. 'Miracle')	Hoshino	4:52
9.	"Memories" (featuring Umi and Camilo)	Hoshino; Tierra Umi Wilson; Camilo Correa	3:36
10.	"Kurayami" (暗闇, lit. 'Darkness')	Hoshino	3:53
11.	"Why"	Hoshino	4:08
12.	"Life" (生命体, Seimeitai)	Hoshino	3:12
13.	"Eden" (featuring Cordae and DJ Jazzy Jeff)	Hoshino; Wilson; Cordae Brooks	3:41
14.	"Sayonara" (lit. 'Farewell')	Hoshino	3:24
15.	"I Wanna Be Your Ghost" (異世界混合大舞踏会, Isekai Kongō Dai-butōkai, lit. 'Grand Stage of Parallel Worlds')	Hoshino	3:48
16.	"Eureka"	Hoshino	3:32
Total length:			55:45

Gen — Box Set: Visual (DVD #1/Blu-ray #1 — Gen Hoshino Presents Reassembly Live)
No.	Title	Length
1.	"Bakemono" (化物, lit. 'Monster')	3:06
2.	"Sakura no Mori" (桜の森, lit. 'Cherry Blossom Forest')	5:32
3.	"Miss You" (ミスユー, Misu Yū)	5:06
4.	"Present"	4:08
5.	"Fushigi"	5:03
6.	"Dancing on the Inside" (うちで踊ろう, Uchi de Odorō)	3:56
7.	"Continues"	4:44
8.	"Sun"	4:13
9.	"Aru Shashō" (ある車掌, lit. 'A Train Conducter')	4:24
10.	"Nichijō" (日常, lit. 'Everyday Life')	5:27
11.	"Comedy"	4:05
12.	"Hello Song"	6:07

Gen — Box Set: Visual (DVD #2/Blu-ray #1 — Gen Hoshino Presents Reassembly Live)
No.	Title	Length
13.	"Hoshino Gen e no Oiwai Comment" (星野源へのお祝いコメント, lit. 'Congratulatory Comments for Gen Hoshino')
14.	"Talk Part" (トークパート, Tōku Pāto)
15.	"Nise Akira e no Oiwai Comment" (ニセ明へのお祝いコメント, lit. 'Congratulatory Comments for Akira Nise')
16.	"Kimi wa Bara yori Utsukushī" (君は薔薇より美しい, lit. 'You're More Beautiful Than a Rose')	3:56
17.	"Natsu no Klaxon" (夏のクラクション, Natsu no Kurakushon, lit. 'Summer Klaxon')	4:17
18.	"Real"	4:25
19.	"I Wanna Be Your Ghost" (featuring Akira Nise)	4:31

Gen — Box Set: Visual (DVD #3/Blu-ray #2 — Reassembly Extra and Akira Nise Presents "Fake")
No.	Title	Length
1.	"Akira Nise Presents 'Fake': Sōsaku Micchaku Documentary — Nise Akira to Nakama-tachi, 2025 Haru" (創作密着ドキュメンタリー「ニセ明と仲間たち、2025 春」, lit. 'Close-up Writing Documentary: Akira Nise and Friends, Spring 2025')
2.	"Gen Hoshino Presents Reassembly: After (Birthday) Party" (アフター(バースデー)パーティー, Afutā (Bāsudē) Pātī)
3.	"Talk Selection" (トークセレクション, Tōku Serekushon)
4.	"Documentary" (ドキュメンタリー, Dokyumentarī)
5.	"Nametonka" (Live at Osaka-jō Hall; なめとんか, lit. 'You Kidding Me?')	5:09

== Charts ==
=== Weekly charts ===
Weekly chart performance for Gen
Chart (2025)	Peak position
Japanese Albums (Oricon)	2
Japanese Combined Albums (Oricon)	2
Japanese Hot Albums (Billboard Japan)	2

=== Monthly charts ===
Monthly chart performance for Gen
Chart (2025)	Position
Japanese Albums (Oricon)	6

=== Year-end charts ===
Year-end chart performance for Gen
Chart (2025)	Position
Japanese Albums (Oricon)	47
Japanese Hot Albums (Billboard Japan)	35

== Certifications ==
Certifications for Gen
Region	Certification	Certified units/sales
Japan (RIAJ) Physical	Gold	100,000^{^}
^{^} Shipments figures based on certification alone.

== Release history ==
Release dates and formats for Gen
Region	Date	Edition	Format(s)	Label	Ref.
Japan	May 14, 2025	Standard	CD	Speedstar	
Japan	May 14, 2025	Box Set: Visual	Box+CD+2 Blu-rays	Speedstar	
Japan	May 14, 2025	Box Set: Visual	Box+CD+3 DVDs	Speedstar	
Japan	May 14, 2025	Box Set: Poetry	Box+CD+book	Speedstar	
Various	May 14, 2025	Standard	Digital download; streaming	Speedstar	
South Korea	May 14, 2025	Standard	Digital download; streaming	J-Box	
Japan	May 31, 2025	Standard	Rental CD	Speedstar	
Taiwan	June 6, 2025	Standard	CD	Rock	
