= Tadataka Unno =

Japanese jazz pianist

Tadataka Unno 海野 雅威
- Born: 海野 雅威 (Unno Tadataka); 15 August 1980 (age 46); Tokyo, Japan
- Genres: Jazz
- Occupations: Musician, composer
- Instrument: Piano
- Years active: 1998–present
- Website: www.tadatakaunno.com

Tadataka Unno (海野 雅威, Unno Tadataka; born 15 August 1980) is a Japanese jazz pianist.

== Career ==
Tadataka Unno was born in Tokyo. He started playing jazz at age 9 and attended the Tokyo University of the Arts. Unno began his career by joining the trio of Japanese jazz musician Yoshio Suzuki and played professionally in Japan for the next 10 years. In 2008, Unno moved to New York City and lived in Harlem. In 2010, Unno was recommended to play at the Jazz Rising Stars Program of Ravinia Festival by Nathan Davis and Curtis Fuller. He was the only Asian musician ever selected as a regular member in the history of the Roy Hargrove Quintet and the final pianist of the group, performing with the band for two years until Roy’s passing. He has also performed as a member of the Jimmy Cobb Trio, Winard Harper and Jeli Posse, Clifton Anderson Quartet, John Pizzarelli Trio, and is currently a member of Jeff Hamilton Trio.

Unno has performed at the Kennedy Center, Blue Note Jazz Club, and Village Vanguard. He has released six jazz albums including Journeyer, which was recorded with American musicians Hassan J.J. Shakur and Jerome Jennings.

== Personal life ==
Unno is married and has a child.

When Hank Jones died in May 2010, Unno was at his deathbed.

=== 2020 racist attack ===
In September 2020, Unno was attacked in a hate crime incident by a group of eight teenagers while exiting a subway station in Harlem, New York City. He required surgery for broken bones and had suffered permanent injuries. Against the backdrop of the sharp increase in anti-Asian sentiment due to the COVID-19 pandemic, the attackers had made assumptions that Unno was Chinese and uttered anti-Asian profanities.

After the incident, he stated that he intended to return to Japan, adding that "My wife and I worry about raising kids here [In the United States], especially after this happened." Following surgery and physical therapy, he has since been able to perform before audiences once again.

== Discography ==
=== As leader/co-leader ===
- Pee Ka Boo! (What's New, 2004)
- My Romance - The first sketch of Tadataka Unno (Sony Music, 2008)
- As Time Goes By (Zzjaplus, 2010)
- Plays Jazz Standards - Solo Piano (Zzjaplus, 2011)
- Journeyer (self-released, 2014)
- Danro with Yutaka Yoshida (Somethin' Cool, 2018)
- Get My Mojo Back (Verve, 2022) – come-back work
- I Am, Because You Are (Verve, 2023)

=== As sideman ===
- Gen Hoshio, I Wanna Be Your Ghost (SPEEDSTAR RECORDS(Victor Entertainment), 2022)
- Clifton Anderson, Been Down This Road Before (BSMF, 2020)
- George DeLancey, Paradise (self-released, 2020)
- Ken Fowser, Morning Light (Posi-Tone, 2020)
- Stephanie Sellars, Girl Who Loves (CD Baby, 2019)
- Jimmy Cobb, Remembering U featuring Roy Hargrove (Jimmy Cobb World, 2019)
- Dan Block, Block Party (Miles High, 2018)
- Luca Stoll, MONO Live in Vevey (CD Baby, 2015)
- Nick Hempton, Catch and Release (Triple-Distilled, 2015)
- Eyal Vilner Big Band, Almost Sunrise (Gut String, 2015)
- Clovis Nicolas, Nine Stories (Sunnyside, 2014)
- Winard Harper and Jeli Posse, Coexist (Jazz Legacy Productions, 2012)
- Ben Powell, New Street (self-released, 2012)
- Jimmy Cobb, Remembering Miles (Sony Music, 2011)
- Jacob Melchior, It's about time (CD Baby, 2010)
- Takao Iwaki, Introducing Takao Iwaki (White Sands, 2010)
- Tiffany, Yesterday & Yesterdays (Eighty-Eight's, 2009)
- Tiffany, Amazing Grace (Eighty-Eight's, 2008)
- Shunsuke Umino, Beautiful Friendship (Musical Dog, 2008)
- Masahiko Osaka, Hommage (M&I, 2008)
- Yoshio "Chin" Suzuki, For You featuring Tadataka Unno (55, 2007)
- Tiffany, My Favorite Things (Eighty-Eight's, 2007)
- Tiffany, The Nearness of You (Eighty-Eight's, 2006)
- Yoichi Kobayashi Quintet, Culture Shock (M&I, 2006)
- Tomio Morota Sextet, Tommy a go go (MHVP, 2006)
- Tomio Morota Sextet, Sir Horace (MHVP, 2006)
- Akiko, Simply Blue (Verve, 2005)
- Baby Boo, Ubugoe Onsen 3 Christmas Cover Songs (Universal Music Japan, 2004)
- Yoshiko Fukuda, Sukiyaki (Sera Music, 2003)

=== Other appearances ===
- V.A. from Aoyama Body & Soul, Onajimi-kyoku (お馴染み曲) – Well Known Melody (Body & Soul, 2008)
- V.A. from Aoyama Body & Soul, 3P The Trio (Body & Soul, 2007)
- V.A. from Aoyama Body & Soul, 5 Female Vocalists (Body & Soul, 2007)
- V.A., ChristmaSwing (Avex, 2004)
