= Shun Ishiwaka =

- Born: 1992; Kiyosato, Hokkaido
- Genres: Jazz
- Instrument: Drum kit

Shun Ishiwaka (石若駿, born 1992) is a Japanese jazz drummer. He has performed alongside artists such as Hiromi Uehara, Ai Kuwabara, Sakura Fujiwara, Jason Moran, Kurt Rosenwinkel, John Scofield, and Chris Potter.

== Biography ==
Shun Ishiwaka was born in Kiyosato, Hokkaido in 1992. At the age of 12, he was invited to perform live with trumpeter Terumasa Hino. He attended Tokyo University of the Arts, majoring in percussion. Upon graduating, Shun received the Acanthus Music Award and the Doseikai Award.

In 2012 Shun provided drum recording and motion capture for the character of Sentarō Kawabuchi (川渕 千太郎) in Kids on the Slope.

In 2023, Shun recorded drums for the Blue Giant film soundtrack alongside pianist Hiromi Uehara, as well as the drum parts for the character Shunji Tamada in the film. That same year he was also invited to record with Kenshi Yonezu on his song "Spinning Globe" for the Studio Ghibli film The Boy and the Heron.
