= Comedy (song) =

Single by Gen Hoshino

from the album Gen
- Language: Japanese
- Released: April 8, 2022
- Genre: J-pop
- Length: 3:51
- Label: Speedstar
- Songwriters: Gen Hoshino; Mabanua
- Producer: Gen Hoshino

Gen Hoshino singles chronology
"Cube" (2021)	"Comedy" (2022)	"I Wanna Be Your Ghost" (2022)

Audio sample
- file; help

Music video
- "Comedy" on YouTube

"Comedy" (喜劇, Kigeki) (Japanese pronunciation: [kiꜜgeki]) is a song recorded by Japanese singer-songwriter Gen Hoshino from his sixth studio album, Gen (2025). It was released through Speedstar Records on April 8, 2022, and used as the ending theme song for the first season of the anime Spy × Family. The song also appeared on Fortnite's Soundwave Series. With peak positions at number four on Japan Hot 100 and number 127 on Billboard Global 200, "Comedy" has been certified Gold by the Recording Industry Association of Japan for 100,000 digital sales and Platinum for 100,000,000 streams.

== Background and release ==
On March 17, 2022, Spy × Family official website announced that Gen Hoshino will be performing the ending theme for the anime with "Comedy", premiering on April 9, 2022. It was released as a digital single in Japan on April 8, 2022, through Speedstar Records. The song was also featured on Fortnite's Soundwave Series for 72 hours, starting from June 9, 2022.

== Composition and lyrics ==
"Comedy" is composed in the key of C-sharp minor on the verses and the first two chorus, C♯ major on the bridge and in D minor in the final chorus and is set in time signature of common time with a tempo of 88 BPM, runs for three minutes and 51 seconds. It was composed and written by Gen Hoshino for the anime Spy × Family, with idea of family while being conscious of the sense of family that the story has. "I wrote this song while thinking about the "family" of Loid, Yor, and Anya in Spy × Family and the meaning of the word 'family'," Hoshino says of the song. "While listening to the completed song, I feel that the song is very suitable for the coming warm season when trees are lush and flowers are blooming."

== Music video ==
The music video for "Comedy" was released on May 5, 2022, and directed by MESS. It depicts a form of a certain 'family' in which Hoshino and mysterious creatures live together and go about their daily lives.

== Personnel ==
- Gen Hoshino – vocals, lyrics, composer, arranger, piano, synthesizer
- Mabanua – bass, vibraphone, piano, analog synthesizer, co-arranger
- Ryosuke Nagaoka – guitar, backing vocals, background vocals arranger
- Shojiro Watanabe – mixing
- Takahiro Uchida – mastering
- Satoshi Goto – assistant
- Manabe Hiroshi – assistant

== Charts ==
=== Weekly charts ===
Weekly chart performance for "Comedy"
Chart (2022)	Peak position
Global 200 (Billboard)	127
Japan Hot 100 (Billboard)	4
Japan Hot Animation (Billboard Japan)	2
Japan Combined Singles (Oricon)	11
Taiwan (Billboard)	21

=== Year-end charts ===
Year-end chart performance for "Comedy"
Chart (2022)	Position
Japan (Japan Hot 100)	50
Japan Hot Animation (Billboard Japan)	13

== Certifications and sales ==
Certifications for "Comedy"
Region	Certification	Certified units/sales
Japan (RIAJ)	Gold	100,000^{*}
Streaming
Japan (RIAJ)	Platinum	100,000,000^{†}
^{*} Sales figures based on certification alone.^{†} Streaming-only figures based on certification alone.

== Awards and nominations ==
Awards and nominations for "Comedy"
Ceremony	Year	Award	Result	Ref.
7th Crunchyroll Anime Awards	2023	Best Anime Song	Nominated	
7th Crunchyroll Anime Awards	2023	Best Ending Sequence	Won	
