= Mabanua =

- Born: Manabu Yamaguchi (山口 学); August 29, 1984 (age 41); Saitama Prefecture, Japan
- Occupations: Music producer; musician; singer
- Instrument: Drums
- Years active: 2006–present
- Label: Origami Productions
- Member of: Ovall
- Website: mabanua.com

Manabu Yamaguchi (山口 学, Yamaguchi Manabu; born August 29, 1984), better known by his alias Mabanua (stylized in lowercase; Japanese pronunciation: [mabaꜜnɯa]), is a Japanese music producer, drummer, and singer. He released his first album Done Already in November 2008 and has participated in production for artists including Kenshi Yonezu, Gen Hoshino, Imase, and Official Hige Dandism. He is also member of the three-person band Ovall.

== Early life and career ==
Manabu Yamaguchi was born in Saitama Prefecture, Japan, on August 29, 1984. His alias, Mabanua, is an anagram of his real name. Yamaguchi described both of his parents as music fans, which resulted in the first CD he bought being "Totsuzen" by Field of View, since his father was a fan of composer Tetsurō Oda who had written it. Yamaguchi began listening to the rock bands Mr. Children and the Beatles, who he grew particularly fond of. A Sigma by Martin acoustic guitar from his grandfather was Yamaguchi's first instrument, though he had become interested in drums after watching live recordings of the Beatles' Ringo Starr. His first band experience was with friends in middle school, who together frequently played covers of Oasis. In his second year of high school, Yamaguchi transferred to NHK Gakuen—a distance education school operated by the public broadcaster NHK—after hearing of its music club. After graduation, he attended a music school for around two and a half years.

In 2006, Yamaguchi joined the band Ovall. Signed to Origami Productions, he launched a solo career in 2008 and released his debut album Done Already. Apart from his solo and band activities, Yamaguchi has participated in recordings by other artists, such as on Official Hige Dandism's "Bedroom Talk" (arrangement; 2021), Original Love's Music, Dance, & Love (drums; 2022), Imase's "Utopia" (drums; 2023), and Kenshi Yonezu's "Lady" (drums; 2023). Yamaguchi is a recurring collaborator of singer-songwriter Gen Hoshino, for whom he has co-arranged and programmed songs.

== Personal life ==
In 2012, Yamaguchi moved to Kiryū, Gunma. He established a home studio there in 2019, where he is still based as of January 2022.

== Studio albums ==
Uncharted works adapted from Oricon.

List of studio albums, with selected chart positions
Title	Album details	Peak chart positions
Title	Album details	JPN Hot
Done Already	Released: November 19, 2008; Label: Origami	—
Only the Facts	Released: November 21, 2011; Label: Origami	—
Blurred	Released: August 29, 2018; Label: Origami	52
"—" denotes a recording that did not chart or was not eligible to chart.
