= List of songs by Gen Hoshino =

Songs by Japanese singer-songwriter

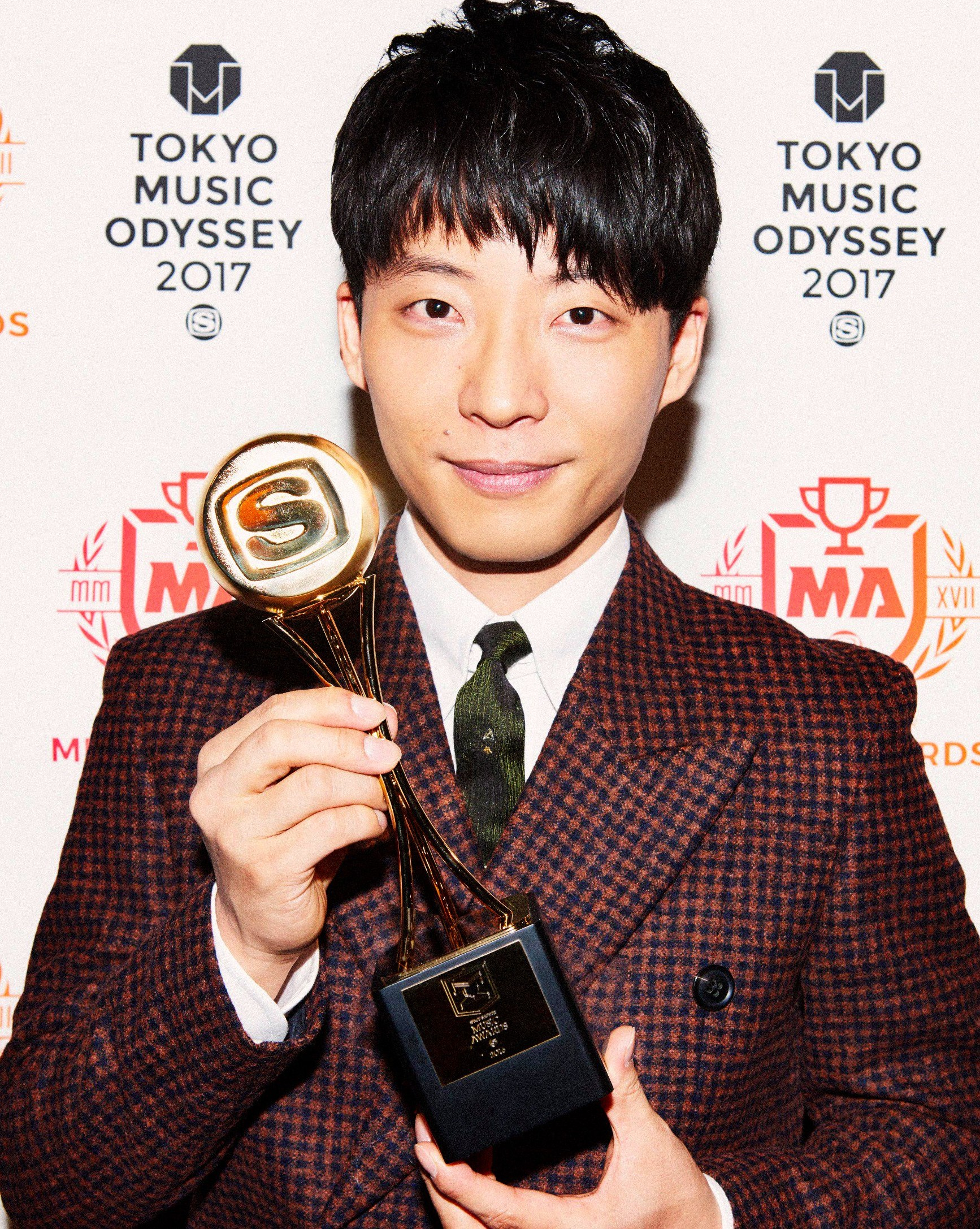
Hoshino at the 2017 Space Shower Music Awards

Japanese singer-songwriter, musician, and actor Gen Hoshino has written or co-written most songs from his solo discography, which consists of six studio albums, two extended plays (EPs), and twenty-five singles. Within his broader catalogue, he has written songs for other artists and guest performed on singles, cover albums, a remix, and studio albums.

Hoshino began his musical career as the guitarist and marimba player for Sakerock (2000–2015), an instrumental band that he formed with high school classmates. Besides the band, he worked as an actor and wrote music for stage plays. As a solo artist, Hoshino released a CD-R titled Baka no Uta in 2005 and the CD Barabara in 2007, the latter as a bundle to a booklet by photographer Taro Hirano. They included original tracks and Sakerock covers with added lyrics; a cover of Crazy Cats' "Sūdara Bushi" (1961) was included on both. His debut studio album, also titled Baka no Uta (2010), featured two Sakerock covers ("Rōfūfu" and "Ana o Horu") and "Tadaima", co-written by Haruomi Hosono. Hoshino wrote all songs on his following four albums—Episode (2011), Stranger (2013), Yellow Dancer (2015), and Pop Virus (2018)—solely by himself. Same Thing (2019), his first EP, featured British indie band Superorganism, English producer Tom Misch, and Japanese rapper Punpee; his second EP, Lighthouse (2023), featured comedian Masayasu Wakabayashi and American instrumentalists Louis Cole, Sam Gendel, and Sam Wilkes. Hoshino's sixth studio album, eponymously titled Gen, was released in May 2025. It includes a lengthened version of the Lighthouse song with Cole, Gendel, and Wilkes, and new features from Lee Young-ji, Cordae, DJ Jazzy Jeff, Umi, and Camilo.

Aside material for his albums, Hoshino has recorded B-sides exclusives to singles and guest appeared on others' work. He covered Haruomi Hosono's "Rose and Beast" (1973) with Ren Takada for the latter's album 12 Notes (2006), performed the song "Taiyaki" (2006) with Hisashi Yoshino, played acoustic guitar on the Saho Terao songs "Kakurete Nai de" (2007) and "Otenkiame" (2009), and lent vocals to Yuri Miyauchi's "Dokusho" (2011). Hoshino covered Raymond Scott's "Lucky Strike" on the tribute album Raymond Scott Songbook (2013) and songs by former members of the Beatles for the compilation Ringo no Komori-uta: Apple of the Best Eye (2014). He remixed Dua Lipa's "Good in Bed" for her Club Future Nostalgia (2020), performed the song "Nomad" with Korean rapper Zion.T for Shang-Chi and the Legend of the Ten Rings: The Album (2021), and featured alongside other artists on Superorganism's single "Into the Sun" from World Wide Pop (2022).

Hoshino has written songs for other artists as a non-performer, including "Chingiri-dera" (2004) and "Tingue Bossa Bosa Bossa Nova" (2006) for Tom Miyazaki, "Wuhan no Hito" (2009) for Asa-Chang & Junray, "Banana Oiwake" (2011) for Hosono, "Otona" (2019) for Noritake Kinashi and Toshinobu Kubota, and "Kawaii" (2025) for Le Sserafim. With screenwriter Kankurō Kudō, he wrote four songs from 2010 to 2016 for the NHK series Mītsuketa!, which were released on soundtrack albums. As the alter ego character Akira Nise, Hoshino has performed numerous live covers of singer Akira Fuse's "Kimi wa Bara yori Utsukushī" (1979); he has received original writing credits under the name of the character, such as on Kanjani Eight's "Ima" (2017). Hoshino's discography also consists of annual birthday songs for the comedian Yūki Himura, radio jingles, and various unreleased tracks registered with the Japanese Society for Rights of Authors, Composers, and Publishers.

== Songs ==
=== Main songs ===
Key
‡	Indicates non-artist writing credits
†	Indicates songs not written by Hoshino

List of songs by Gen Hoshino, with songwriters, associated releases, and year (167 entries)
Song	Writer(s)	Core release(s)	Year	Ref.
"2" (featuring Lee Young-ji)	Gen Hoshino; Lee Young-ji	Gen	2025	
"Ai no Sei" (愛のせい; lit. 'Love's Fault') (Note: "Ai no Sei" was originally performed by Hoshino during a 2014 concert as a duet with Okuda. Video was included in its live album, Two Beat in Yokohama Arena, and an audio release features on In Gratitude.) (with Tamio Okuda)	Gen Hoshino	In Gratitude	2020	
"Ain't Nobody Know" (featuring Tom Misch)	Gen Hoshino; Tom Misch	Same Thing	2019	
"All Things Must Pass" (with Yoshie Nakano; cover of George Harrison)	George Harrison†	Ringo no Komori-uta: Apple of the Best Eye	2014	
"Amaoto" (雨音; lit. 'Rain Sound') (Note: Exclusively released as a home recording with the subtitle "(House Ver.)")	Gen Hoshino	"Koi" (B-side)	2016	
"Ana o Horu" (穴を掘る; lit. 'Dig a Hole') (lyrical cover of Sakerock)	Gen Hoshino	Baka no Uta (album) and Barabara	2007	
"Aru Shashō" (ある車掌; lit. 'A Train Conducter')	Gen Hoshino	Stranger	2013	
"Baito" (バイト; lit. 'Part-Time Job')	Gen Hoshino	Episode	2011	
"Baka no Uta" (ばかのうた; lit. 'Stupid Song')	Gen Hoshino	Baka no Uta (CD-R and album) and Barabara	2005	
"Bakemono" (化物; lit. 'Monster')	Gen Hoshino	Stranger	2013	
"Balanco" (ブランコ, Buranko; lit. 'Swing')	Gen Hoshino	"Kudaranai no Naka ni" (B-side)	2011	
"Banana Oiwake" (バナナ追分; lit. 'Banana Folk Song') (by Haruomi Hosono)	Haruomi Hosono; Gen Hoshino‡	HoSoNoVa	2011	
"Barabara" (ばらばら; lit. 'Scatter')	Gen Hoshino	Baka no Uta (CD-R and album) and Barabara	2005	
"Beyond the Sequence" (Note: Instrumental track)	Gen Hoshino	"Why" / "Life" (B-side)	2023	
"Chawan" (茶碗; lit. 'Teacup')	Gen Hoshino	Baka no Uta (album)	2010	
"Chingiri-dera" (チン斬り寺; lit. 'Chingiri Temple') (by Tom Miyazaki)	Gen Hoshino; Tom Miyazaki‡	Miyazaki Tom Kinen-kan	2004	
"Comedy" (喜劇, Kigeki) (Note: A remix of "Comedy", featuring DJ Jazzy Jeff and Kaidi Tatham, was released as a promotional single in 2022.)	Gen Hoshino (Note: Mabanua is credited with co-arrangement.)	Gen	2022	
"Continues"	Gen Hoshino	Pop Virus and "Koi" (B-side)	2016	
"Crazy Crazy"	Gen Hoshino	Yellow Dancer	2014	
"Create" (創造, Sōzō)	Gen Hoshino (Note: Mabanua is credited with co-arrangement and Sunny Boy is credited with English translation.)	Gen	2021	
"Cube"	Gen Hoshino	Non-album single	2021	
"Daisy Omisoshiru" (デイジーお味噌汁, Deijī Omisoshiru; lit. 'Daisy Miso Soup')	Gen Hoshino	Baka no Uta (album) and Daisy Holiday	2008	
"Dancer" (ダンサー, Dansā)	Gen Hoshino	"Shiranai" (B-side)	2012	
"Dancing on the Inside" (うちで踊ろう, Uchi de Odorō) (Note: A "Potluck Mix" of "Dancing on the Inside" was released as a promotional single in 2020. A third rendition, "New Year's Eve" (大晦日, Ōmisoka), was performed at the 71st NHK Kōhaku Uta Gassen and later released on the B-side to the "Fushigi" / "Create" (2021) single.)	Gen Hoshino	In Gratitude	2020	
"Dancing Reluctantly" (しかたなく踊る, Shikatanaku Odoru)	Gen Hoshino	Lighthouse	2023	
"Dead End" (いきどまり, Ikidomari)	Gen Hoshino	Non-album single	2025	
"Dead Leaf"	Gen Hoshino	Pop Virus	2018	
"Denpa-tō" (電波塔; lit. 'Radio Mast')	Gen Hoshino	"Yume no Soto e" (B-side)	2012	
"Dokusho" (読書; lit. 'Reading') (Yuri Miyauchi featuring Gen Hoshino)	Yuri Miyauchi; Gen Hoshino	Working Holiday	2011	
"Doraemon" (ドラえもん)	Gen Hoshino; Shunsuke Kikuchi (Note: Kikuchi receives a writing credit for the song's usage of a melody from the song "Boku Doraemon".)	Non-album single	2018	
"Doraemon no Uta" (ドラえもんのうた; lit. 'Song of Doraemon') (cover of Kumiko Ōsugi and Doraemon/Nobuyo Ōyama)	Shunsuke Kikuchi; Takumi Kusube; Babasusumu (Note: Hoshino is credited with arrangement.)†	"Doraemon" (B-side)	2018	
"Down Town"	Gen Hoshino	Yellow Dancer	2015	
"Drinking Dance"	Gen Hoshino	"Koi" (B-side)	2016	
"Dust" (ダスト, Dasuto)	Gen Hoshino	"Gag" (B-side)	2013	
"Eden" (featuring Cordae and DJ Jazzy Jeff)	Gen Hoshino; Tierra Umi Wilson; Cordae Brooks (Note: DJ Jazzy Jeff is credited with co-arrangement.)	Gen	2025	
"Eigyō" (営業; lit. 'Business')	Gen Hoshino	Episode	2011	
"Eureka"	Gen Hoshino	Gen	2025	
"Fake" (Note: "Fake" was released in two versions: one performed only by Hoshino as Akira Nise, and a second featuring Mamoru Miyano as Mamoru Miyabi, Hama Okamoto as Usuno Haruo, and Mone Kamishiraishi as Mane Kamishiraishi.) (as Akira Nise)	Gen Hoshino (as Akira Nise)	Non-album single	2025	
"Family Song"	Gen Hoshino	Pop Virus	2017	
"Film" (フィルム, Firumu)	Gen Hoshino	Stranger	2012	
"Friend Ship"	Gen Hoshino	Yellow Dancer	2015	
"Funk" (Note: A jingle written by Hoshino to celebrate the 50th anniversary of All Night Nippon in 2017.)	Gen Hoshino	In Gratitude	2020	
"Fushigi" (不思議; lit. 'Miracle')	Gen Hoshino	Gen	2021	
"Futon" (布団; lit. 'Bedding')	Gen Hoshino	Episode	2011	
"Gag" (ギャグ, Gyagu)	Gen Hoshino (Note: Seiji Kameda is credited with arrangement.)	Non-album single	2013	
"Get a Feel"	Gen Hoshino	Pop Virus	2018	
"Glitch"	Gen Hoshino	Gen	2025	
"Goo" (グー, Gū)	Gen Hoshino	Baka no Uta (album)	2010	
"Good in Bed" (Note: Hoshino's remix of "Good in Bed" was released on the unmixed version of Club Future Nostalgia and on the Japanese bonus edition of Future Nostalgia. A mash-up with Zach Witness' remix of the same song is included on the DJ Mix of Club Future Nostalgia.) (remix of Dua Lipa)	Dua Lipa; Michel Shulz; Melanie Joy Fontana; Taylor Upsahl; David Biral; Denzel Baptiste†	Club Future Nostalgia (standard edition) and Future Nostalgia (Japanese bonus edition)	2020	
"Growing Up Up" (グローイング アップップ, Gurōingu Appuppu) (by Hiroki Miyake and Chika Uchida)	Gen Hoshino; Kankurō Kudō (Note: Tosh Masuda is credited with arrangement.)‡	Mītsuketa! Utatte Fever	2016	
"Hada" (肌; lit. 'Skin')	Gen Hoshino	Pop Virus and "Family Song" (B-side)	2017	
"Halfway" (折り合い, Oriai; lit. 'Compromise')	Gen Hoshino	In Gratitude	2020	
"Happy Xmas (War Is Over)" (with various artists; cover of the Plastic Ono Band)	John Lennon; Yoko Ono†	Ringo no Komori-uta: Apple of the Best Eye	2014	
"Hello Song"	Gen Hoshino	Pop Virus	2018	
"Hirameki" (ひらめき; lit. 'Flash')	Gen Hoshino	Baka no Uta (album)	2010	
"Hon no Intro" (本のイントロ, Hon no Intoro; lit. 'Book Intro')	Gen Hoshino	Barabara	2007	
"Hon no Outro" (本のアウトロ, Hon no Autoro; lit. 'Book Outro')	Gen Hoshino	Barabara	2007	
"Ichi Ni San" (いち に さん; lit. 'One Two Three') (Note: A different version of "Ichi Ni San" was recorded by Hoshino as his alter ego character Akira Nise, which is included on the In Gratitude (2020) compilation album.)	Gen Hoshino	"Sun" (B-side)	2015	
"Idea (アイデア, Aidea)	Gen Hoshino	Pop Virus	2018	
"Ima" (今; lit. 'Present') (by Kanjani Eight)	Gen Hoshino (as Akira Nise) (Note: Yoko Kanno is credited with arrangement.)‡	Jam	2017	
"The Songs of Inst Band" (インストバンドの唄, Insuto Bando no Uta; lit. 'Song of the Instrumental Band') (cover of Sakerock)	Gen Hoshino	Barabara	2007	
"Into the Sun" (Superorganism featuring Gen Hoshino, Stephen Malkmus, Pi Ja Ma, and Axel Concato)	Superorganism; Axel Concato†	World Wide Pop	2022	
"Intro at Atlantic"	Gen Hoshino	Baka no Uta (CD-R)	2005	
"I Wanna Be Your Ghost" (異世界混合大舞踏会, Isekai Kongō Dai-butōkai; lit. 'Grand Stage of Parallel Worlds')	Gen Hoshino	Gen	2022	
"Kakurete Nai de" (かくれてないで; lit. 'Don't Hide') (by Saho Terao) (Note: While not credited as an artist or songwriter, Hoshino performs on acoustic guitar.)	Saho Terao†	Onmi	2007	
"Kanata" (彼方; lit. 'Yonder')	Gen Hoshino	"Yume no Soto e" (B-side)	2012	
"Kawaii" (lit. 'Cute') (by Le Sserafim)	Gen Hoshino; Score (13); Megatone (13); Huh Yunjin; Justin Reinstein; Morgan Kubes; Loar; Kanata Okajima; BB Elliott; Ikki; Okhan Uenver; Jonna Hall; Malin Christin; Ninos Hanna; Maya Rose; CX Lucas‡	"Different" (B-side)	2025	
"Kazoku Nan Desu" (家族なんです; lit. 'We're Family') (Note: "Kazoku Nan Desu" was performed by Hoshino in all episodes of the television drama Jūichinin mo Iru! (2011). The song was available as a chaku-uta (ringtone) on the television music download service Tere Asa Sound, prior to the site's closure.)	Gen Hoshino; Kankurō Kudō	Non-album promotional single	2011	
"Kawaranai Mama" (変わらないまま; lit. 'Unchanging')	Gen Hoshino	Episode	2011	
"Kenka" (喧嘩; lit. 'Argument')	Gen Hoshino	Episode	2011	
"Kids"	Gen Hoshino	Pop Virus and "Family Song" (B-side)	2017	
"Kimi to Hoshi" (キミと星; lit. 'You and the Star')	Gen Hoshino	Hoshino Gen no All Night Nippon: Listener Dai-kansha Party	2022	
"Kisetsu" (季節; lit. 'Season')	Gen Hoshino	Stranger and "Shiranai" (B-side)	2013	
"Kitchen" (キッチン, Kicchin)	Gen Hoshino	Baka no Uta (album)	2010	
"Kodomo" (子供; lit. 'Kid')	Gen Hoshino	Baka no Uta (album)	2010	
"Koko ni Inai Anata e" (ここにいないあなたへ; lit. 'To You Who Isn't Here')	Gen Hoshino	"Doraemon" (B-side)	2018	
"Koi" (恋; lit. 'Love')	Gen Hoshino	Pop Virus	2016	
"Kuchizuke" (口づけ; lit. 'Kiss')	Gen Hoshino	Yellow Dancer	2015	
"Kudaranai no Naka ni" (くだらないの中に; lit. 'In the Nonsense')	Gen Hoshino	Episode	2011	
"Kuse no Uta" (くせのうた; lit. 'Habit Song') (Note: A home recording of "Kuse no Uta" subtitled "(House Ver.)" was released on the B-side to the "Kudaranai no Naka ni" (2011) single.)	Gen Hoshino	Baka no Uta (album)	2010	
"Kurayami" (暗闇; lit. 'Darkness')	Gen Hoshino	Gen	2025	
"Kyōdai" (兄妹; lit. 'Siblings')	Gen Hoshino	Baka no Uta (album)	2010	
"Life" (生命体, Seimeitai)	Gen Hoshino	Gen	2023	
"Lighthouse" (灯台, Tōdai)	Gen Hoshino	Lighthouse	2023	
"Lucky Strike" (ラッキー・ストライク, Rakkī Sutoraiku) (cover of Raymond Scott)	Raymond Scott†	Raymond Scott Songbook	2013	
"Mad Hope" (Note: "Mad Hope" was first released in a short version on Lighthouse before a full-length edition was included on Gen. Though they still performed on the track, the short version did not credit Wilkes as a featuring artist or Cole as a co-writer.) (featuring Louis Cole, Sam Gendel, and Sam Wilkes)	Gen Hoshino; Louis Cole	Lighthouse and Gen	2023	
"Madmen" (マッドメン, Maddo Men)	Gen Hoshino	"Sun" (B-side)	2015	
"Memories" (Note: "Memories" was first performed at the Summer Sonic Festival in 2023 by Hoshino, Umi, Camilo, Sam Gendel, and Jacob Collier.) (featuring Umi and Camilo)	Gen Hoshino; Tierra Umi Wilson; Camilo Correa	Gen	2025	
"Metal"	Gen Hoshino	In Gratitude	2020	
"Mellow 1"	Gen Hoshino	In Gratitude	2020	
"Mellow 2"	Gen Hoshino	In Gratitude	2020	
"Melody"	Gen Hoshino	Gen	2020	
"Mirai" (未来; lit. 'Future')	Gen Hoshino	Episode	2011	
"Miss You" (ミスユー, Misu Yū)	Gen Hoshino	Yellow Dancer	2015	
"Moon Sick"	Gen Hoshino	"Sun" (B-side)	2015	
"Moshi mo" (もしも; lit. 'If')	Gen Hoshino	"Film" (B-side)	2012	
"Nanka Issū" (なんかいっすー; lit. 'Quite Nice') (by Hiroki Miyake)	Gen Hoshino; Kankurō Kudō‡	Mītsuketa! Parade	2010	
"Nerd Strut"	Gen Hoshino	Yellow Dancer	2015	
"Nichijō" (日常; lit. 'Everyday Life')	Gen Hoshino	Episode	2011	
"Night Troop"	Gen Hoshino	"Crazy Crazy" / "Sakura no Mori" (B-side)	2014	
"Nomad" (with Zion.T)	Gen Hoshino; Danny Chung; Jack Latham; Joe Rhee (as Vince); Kim Hae-sol; Kim Byeong-Hoon	Shang-Chi and the Legend of the Ten Rings: The Album	2021	
"Non Stop"	Gen Hoshino	In Gratitude	2020	
"Nothing"	Gen Hoshino	Pop Virus	2018	
"Odd Couple" (おともだち, Otomodachi; lit. 'Friends')	Gen Hoshino	"Why" / "Life" (B-side)	2023	
"Omokage" (おもかげ; lit. 'Reminder')	Gen Hoshino	"Shiranai" (B-side)	2012	
"Orange" (featuring MC. Waka)	Gen Hoshino; Masayasu Wakabayashi (as MC. Waka)	Lighthouse	2023	
"Ossu! Isu no Ōen-dan" (おっす! イスのおうえんだん; lit. 'Yo! Chair Cheerleaders') (by Hiroki Miyake)	Gen Hoshino; Kankurō Kudō‡	Mītsuketa! Paradise	2013	
"Otenkiame" (お天気雨; lit. 'Sun Shower') (by Saho Terao)	Saho Terao†	Ai no Himitsu	2009	
"Otona" (lit. 'Adult') (by Noritake Kinashi featuring Toshinobu Kubota)	Andreas Öhrn; Henrik Smith; Musoh; Noritake Kinashi (as Cycle Kinashi); Gen Hoshino (as Seikaten Hoshino)‡	Kinashi Funk the Best	2019	
"Outcast" (仲間はずれ, Nakama Hazure)	Gen Hoshino	Lighthouse	2023	
"Outro at Pacific"	Gen Hoshino	Baka no Uta (CD-R)	2005	
"Pair Dancer"	Gen Hoshino	Pop Virus	2018	
"Parody" (パロディ, Parodi)	Gen Hoshino	Stranger and "Yume no Soto e" (B-side)	2012	
"Pop Virus" (Note: A rap version of "Pop Virus" was written by Hoshino with MC. Waka, which was performed on the radio program All Night Nippon. It has been released via YouTube and as a bonus track on Yellow Disc: Special Radio Show — Hoshino Coffee Shop (2022), a CD bundled with the sixth issue of Hoshino's Yellow Magazine.)	Gen Hoshino	Pop Virus	2018	
"Present"	Gen Hoshino	Pop Virus	2018	
"Purin" (プリン; lit. 'Pudding')	Gen Hoshino	"Family Song" (B-side)	2017	
"Rakka" (落下; lit. 'Fall')	Gen Hoshino	"Film" (B-side)	2012	
"Ranshi" (乱視; lit. 'Astigmatism')	Gen Hoshino	"Film" (B-side)	2012	
"Real" (as Akira Nise featuring Mamoru Miyano as Mamoru Miyabi and Hama Okamoto as Usuno Haruo)	Gen Hoshino (as Akira Nise)	In Gratitude	2020	
"Record Noise" (レコードノイズ, Rekōdo Noizu)	Gen Hoshino	Stranger	2013	
"Responder" (解答者, Kaitō-sha)	Gen Hoshino	Lighthouse	2023	
"Rōfūfu" (老夫婦; lit. 'Old Couple') (lyrical cover of Sakerock)	Gen Hoshino	Baka no Uta (album)	2010	
"Rose and Beast" (薔薇と野獣, Bara to Yajū) (Ren Takada featuring Gen Hoshino; cover of Haruomi Hosono)	Haruomi Hosono†	12 Notes	2006	
"Sakura no Mori" (桜の森; lit. 'Cherry Blossom Forest')	Gen Hoshino	Yellow Dancer	2014	
"Same Thing" (featuring Superorganism)	Gen Hoshino; Orono Noguchi; Mark David Turner	Same Thing	2019	
"Sapiens" (サピエンス, Sapiensu)	Gen Hoshino	Pop Virus	2018	
"Sarashi-mono" (さらしもの; lit. 'Fool') (featuring Punpee)	Gen Hoshino; Punpee; Tobias Breuer (as Rascal)	Same Thing	2019	
"Sayonara"	Gen Hoshino	Gen	2025	
"Sayōnara no Umi" (さようならのうみ; lit. 'Sea of Farewell')	Gen Hoshino	Baka no Uta (album)	2010	
"Senshu" (選手; lit. 'Sporter') (lyrical cover of Sakerock)	Gen Hoshino	Barabara	2007	
"Shiranai" (知らない; lit. 'I Don't Know')	Gen Hoshino	Stranger	2012	
"The Shower"	Gen Hoshino	"Doraemon" (B-side)	2018	
"Skirt" (スカート, Sukāto)	Gen Hoshino	Stranger	2013	
"Slow"	Gen Hoshino	In Gratitude	2020	
"Snow Men"	Gen Hoshino	Yellow Dancer	2015	
"Soul"	Gen Hoshino	Yellow Dancer	2015	
"Star"	Gen Hoshino	Gen	2025	
"Step" (ステップ, Suteppu)	Gen Hoshino	Episode	2011	
"Stranger"	Gen Hoshino	Stranger (hidden track)	2013	
"Stove" (ストーブ, Sutōbu)	Gen Hoshino	Episode	2011	
"Sūdara Bushi" (スーダラ節; lit. 'Melody of Smooth Trickling') (cover of Crazy Cats)	Yukio Aoshima; Hiroaki Hagiwara†	Baka no Uta (CD-R) and Barabara	2005	
"Suki" (好き)	Gen Hoshino	Non-album single	2026	
"Sun"	Gen Hoshino	Yellow Dancer	2015	
"Suwaru Zō" (すわるぞう; lit. 'Sitting Elephant') (by Hiroki Miyake)	Gen Hoshino; Kankurō Kudō‡	Mītsuketa! Party	2011	
"Tadaima" (ただいま; lit. 'I'm Home')	Gen Hoshino; Haruomi Hosono	Baka no Uta (album)	2010	
"Taiyaki" (たいやき; lit. 'Baked Sea Bream') (with Hisashi Yoshino)	Credits unavailable	4 Tracks Burning!	2006	
"Tingue Bossa Bosa Bossa Nova" (by Tom Miyazaki)	Gen Hoshino; Tom Miyazaki‡	Kondo mo Mise Jimai, Konya de Mise Jimai 2nd Season	2006	
"Tokiyo" (時よ; lit. 'Time')	Gen Hoshino	Yellow Dancer	2015	
"Tomato" (そしたら, Soshitara; lit. 'So')	Gen Hoshino	"Fushigi" / "Create" (B-side)	2021	
"Tour" (ツアー, Tsuā)	Gen Hoshino	Stranger	2013	
"Tsugi wa Nani ni Umaremashō ka" (次は何に産まれましょうか; lit. 'What Should I Be Born as Next?') (Note: A home recorded version of "Tsugi wa Nani ni Umaremashō ka" subtitled "(House Ver.)" was released on the B-side to the "Film" (2012) single.)	Gen Hoshino; Masako Chiba	Baka no Uta (CD-R)	2005	
"Umare Kawari" (生まれ変わり; lit. 'Rebirth')	Gen Hoshino	Stranger	2013	
"Umi o Sukū" (海を掬う; lit. 'Scoop the Ocean')	Gen Hoshino	"Crazy Crazy" / "Sakura no Mori" (B-side)	2014	
"Up Tempo"	Gen Hoshino	In Gratitude	2020	
"Uta o Utau Toki wa" (歌を歌うときは; lit. 'When You Sing Songs')	Gen Hoshino	"Kudaranai no Naka ni" (B-side)	2011	
"Watashi" (私; lit. 'I')	Gen Hoshino	Same Thing	2019	
"Week End"	Gen Hoshino	Yellow Dancer	2015	
"Why" (光の跡, Hikari no Ato; lit. 'Traces of Light')	Gen Hoshino	Gen	2023	
"Why Don't You Play in Hell?" (地獄でなぜ悪い, Jigoku de Naze Warui; lit. 'What's Bad About Hell?')	Gen Hoshino	Yellow Dancer	2013	
"Work Song" (ワークソング, Wāku Songu)	Gen Hoshino	Stranger	2013	
"Wuhan no Hito" (ウーハンの女, Ūhan no Hito; lit. 'Girl from Wuhan') (by Asa-Chang & Junray)	Hirokazu Asakura; Gen Hoshino‡	Kage no Nai Hito	2009	
"Yonaka Uta" (夜中唄; lit. 'Night Song')	Gen Hoshino	Baka no Uta (CD-R and album)	2005	
"Yoru" (夜; lit. 'Night')	Gen Hoshino	Yellow Dancer	2015	
"Yoru no Boat" (夜のボート, Yoru no Bōto; lit. 'Boat at Night') (Note: Hoshino originally performed "Yoru no Boat" with actress Miwako Ichikawa in the 2008 stage play Jokyōshi wa Nido Dakareta. The version included on In Gratitude is a re-recording for co-writer Matsuo's 2019 film 108: Kaiba Gorō no Fukushū to Bōken.)	Gen Hoshino; Suzuki Matsuo	In Gratitude	2020	
"Yuge" (湯気; lit. 'Steam')	Gen Hoshino	Episode and "Kudaranai no Naka ni" (B-side)	2011	
"Yosō" (予想; lit. 'Expectations')	Gen Hoshino	Episode	2011	
"Yume no Soto e" (夢の外へ; lit. 'Out of the Dream')	Gen Hoshino	Stranger	2012	

=== Other songs ===
List of miscellaneous songs by Hoshino, with songwriters and other notes
Song	Writer(s)	Notes	Ref.
"Henshū-sha no Uta" (編集者のうた; lit. 'Song of the Editors')	Gen Hoshino; Suzuki Matsuo	A song written for a 2006 press event that celebrated film director Suzuki Matsuo's birthday.; Hoshino continued to perform the song at select events since 2006, but it remained an "illusive" track in his catalogue. Prior to a performance of the song during a release event for Hoshino's debut single "Kudaranai no Naka ni" (2011), Fanplus Music writers estimated that it had only been heard by around thirty people.	
Birthday songs for Yūki Himura	Gen Hoshino	Since 2010, Hoshino has performed an annual birthday song for the comedian Yūki Himura on the TBS Radio program of his duo Bananaman.; Birthday songs 38–47 (2010–19) were released on Yellow Disc: Birthday Songs for Yuki Himura — Bananaman and Gen Hoshino 2010–2019 (2020), a bonus CD included with the fourth issue of Hoshino's Yellow Magazine.; "Halfway" and "Tomato", the birthday songs in 2020 and 2021, were released as a single and B-side, respectively, and are part of Hoshino's main catalogue.; The 2025 birthday song, "Suki Suki Himura", was written by Hoshino and performed by Bananaman radio staffer Ōkura.	
"Banana de Chop Suruto Taihen" (バナナでチョップすると大変, Banana de Choppu Suru to Taihen; lit. 'It's Hard to Chop Using a Banana')	Gen Hoshino	A song performed live by Bananaman and included on their DVD video album Bananaman Kessaku-sen Live: Banana Chop (2010).; Hoshino is credited as its songwriter on the Japanese Society for Rights of Authors, Composers, and Publishers (JASRAC) database.	
Jingle for Rhyme Master Utamaru no Week End Shuffle	Gen Hoshino (as Super Sukebe Time)	Anonymously under the nickname Super Sukebe Time (lit. 'Super Pervert Time'), Hoshino submitted a jingle into a 2011 competition to be featured on the radio program Rhyme Master Utamaru no Week End Shuffle; it was accepted from a pool of 130 submissions.; Neither the program's staff nor host, rapper Utamaru (formerly of Rhymester), knew the jingle was by Hoshino until years later when Hoshino told Utamaru in private.	
"Kimi wa Bara yori Utsukushī" (君は薔薇より美しい; lit. 'You're More Beautiful Than a Rose') (cover of Akira Fuse)	Mickie Yoshino; Kenji Kadoya	Hoshino has covered Akira Fuse's 1979 single "Kimi wa Bara yori Utsukushī" during various live shows as the alter ego character Akira Nise, a parody of Fuse.; During the 2023 Reassembly tour, the character also performed covers of Junichi Inagaki's "Natsu no Klaxon" (1983) and Yashiki Takajin's "Nametonka" (1990).	
"Stuts Show"	Gen Hoshino; Stuts	A track created by MPC player and Hoshino's supporting band member Stuts by sampling songs from Hoshino's discography.; The song was performed during the Pop Virus tour while Hoshino moved to the main stage of the Tokyo Dome after performing a song from an audience seat.	
"All Night Nippon 55-shūnen Jingle" (オールナイトニッポン55周年ジングル, Ōru Naito Nippon Go-jū Go Shūnen Jinguru; lit. 'All Night Nippon 55th Anniversary Jingle')	Gen Hoshino; Masayasu Wakabayashi (as MC. Waka)	Hoshino composed this short jingle for the 55th anniversary of All Night Nippon in January 2023; comedian Wakabayashi, under his alias MC. Waka, wrote and raps the lyrics.; Registered as "All People Nippon" on the JASRAC database	
Sekisui House commercial theme song	Gen Hoshino	An untitled original song written for an August 2023 commercial promoting Sekisui House's Grande Maison series of apartment buildings.	
"Isshun" (一瞬; lit. 'Moment')	Gen Hoshino	Hoshino wrote this song for a series of commercials by the Japan Racing Association (JRA) that aired in January–February 2024.	
"Iro Enpitsu" (色えんぴつ; lit. 'Colored Pencils')	Gen Hoshino	"Iro Enpitsu" was performed in place of Himura's birthday song in 2024.; Hoshino wrote the song almost twenty years prior for Aka Enpitsu, a parody folk music duo formed of characters played by Bananaman.; The radio version is performed by Aka Enpitsu's Ō-chan (Osamu Shitara) and O-gen (Hoshino).	

=== Unreleased songs ===
List of unreleased songs, with songwriters and additional notes
Song	Writer(s)	Notes	Ref.
"Chūgoku-sei" (中国製; lit. 'Made in China')	Gen Hoshino	Registered with the Japanese Society for Rights of Authors, Composers, and Publishers (JASRAC); Intermission music for the NHK educational program Hyōtan kara Kotoba (2009–2014)	
"Drive-in California BGM" (ドライブインカリフォルニアBGM, Doraibu In Kariforunia BGM)	Gen Hoshino	Registered with the JASRAC; Music from the stage play Drive-in California (2022)	
"Joshi yo" (女子よ; lit. 'Hey, Girls!')	Gen Hoshino	Registered with the JASRAC	
"Kigō no Sekai" (記号の世界; lit. 'World of Code')	Gen Hoshino	Registered with the JASRAC	
"Marshmellow Kibun" (マシュマロ気分, Mashumaro Kibun; lit. 'Marshmellow Mood')	Gen Hoshino	Registered with the JASRAC; "Marshmellow" (マシュマロ) is listed as artist.	
"Motetakute Synchronize" (モテたくてシンクロナイズド, Motetakute Shinkuronaizudo; lit. 'Synchronize for Popularity')	Gen Hoshino; Tomoya Ishii; Tenma Nozaki	Registered with the JASRAC; Hoshino is credited as composer and lyricist; Ishii and Nozaki are named for "supplementary words".	
"Natsu o Yasunderu Bāi Ja Nē" (夏を休んでる場合じゃねぇ; lit. 'This Is No Time to Rest the Summer')	Gen Hoshino	Registered with the JASRAC	
"Nihonshi" (日本史; lit. 'History of Japan')	Gen Hoshino	Registered with the JASRAC; Intermission music for Hyōtan kara Kotoba	
"Omae-tachi Academic Juku-ka" (お前達アカデミナール塾歌, Omae-tachi Akademināru Juku-ka; lit. 'You Are Academic Cram School Anthem')	Gen Hoshino; Kankurō Kudō	Registered with the JASRAC; The cast to Mirai Kōshi Meguru are credited as artist.; Hoshino is credited as composer and Kudō as lyricist.	
"Oyasumi Zukkī" (おやすみズッキー; lit. 'Good Night Zukkī')	Gen Hoshino	Registered with the JASRAC; "Zukkī" (ズッキー) is listed as artist.	
"Pool ni Hairenakatta Shōnen" (プールに入れなかった少年, Pūru ni Hairenakatta Shōnen; lit. 'The Boy Who Didn't Enter the Pool')	Gen Hoshino	Registered with the JASRAC; "Zukkī" (ズッキー) is listed as artist.	
"P.P.O.P"	Gen Hoshino	Registered with the JASRAC; Music from the stage play Smile the Smasher (2004)	
"Sa-cchan" (サッちゃん)	Gen Hoshino; Suzuki Matsuo	Registered with the JASRAC; Music from the stage play Sa-cchan no Ashita (2009); Hoshino is credited as composer and Matsuo as lyricist.	
"Shichi-nin no Koibito BGM" (七人の恋人BGM; lit. 'The Seven Lovers BGM')	Gen Hoshino	Registered with the JASRAC; Music from the stage play Shichi-nin no Koibito (2005)	
"Tsuki kara no Kotoba" (月からの言葉; lit. 'Words from the Moon')	Gen Hoshino; Suzuki Matsuo	Registered with the JASRAC; Music from the stage play Drive-in California (2022); Hoshino is credited as composer and Matsuo as lyricist.	
"Wormhole"	Gen Hoshino	Registered with the JASRAC; Opening theme to Hoshino's own music program, Hoshino Gen no Ongaku Kōron (2022, 2024)	
"Yamada Ichirō no Theme" (山田一郎のテーマ, Yamada Ichirō no Tēma; lit. 'Theme of Ichirō Yamada')	Gen Hoshino	Registered with the JASRAC; The song's title refers to a three-member art unit of Hoshino, video director Santa Yamagishi, and designer Daijirō Ōhara.	
"Yasui Polo Shirt" (安いポロシャツ, Yasui Poro Shatsu; lit. 'Cheap Polo Shirt')	Gen Hoshino	Registered with the JASRAC; "Zukkī" (ズッキー) is listed as artist.	
"Yume ga Nai Wake de wa Nai" (夢がないわけではない; lit. 'It's Not That I Don't Have a Dream')	Gen Hoshino; Suzuki Matsuo	Registered with the JASRAC; Music from the stage play Sa-cchan no Ashita (2009); Hoshino is credited as composer and Matsuo is named as lyricist.	
"Zukkī Dai-bōsō" (ズッキー大暴走; lit. 'Zukkī Gone Wild')	Gen Hoshino	Registered with the JASRAC; "Zukkī" (ズッキー) is listed as artist.	
"Zukkī wa Ittōshō" (ズッキーは一等賞; lit. 'Zukkī Is First Place')	Gen Hoshino	Registered with the JASRAC; "Zukkī" (ズッキー) is listed as artist.	
