= Gen Hoshino Singles Box: Gratitude =

2020 box set by Gen Hoshino

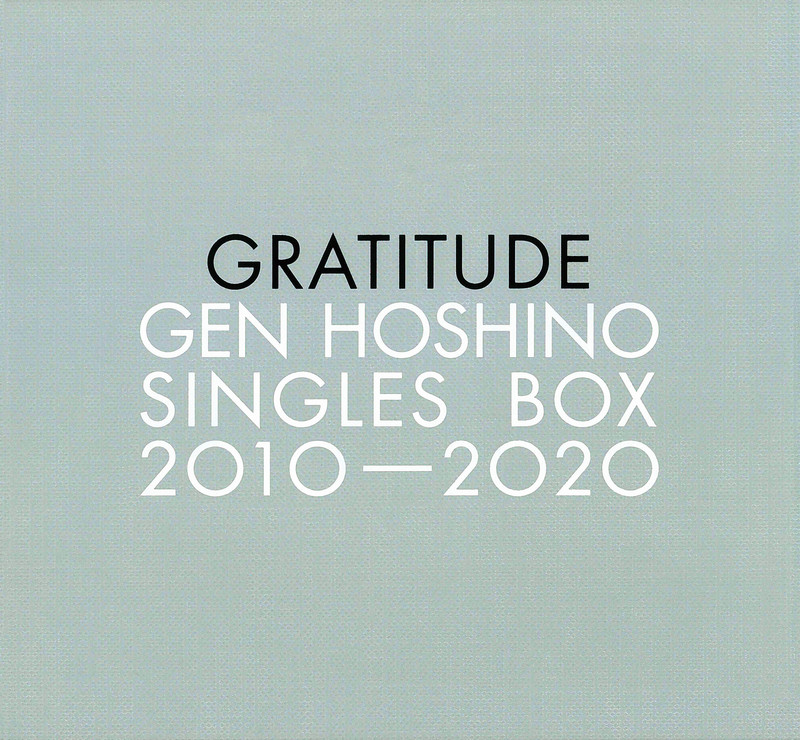

Box set by Gen Hoshino
- Released: October 21, 2020
- Length: 3:09:33 (Note: Length does not include DVD content.)
- Language: Japanese
- Label: Speedstar

Gen Hoshino chronology
Same Thing (2019)	Gen Hoshino Singles Box: Gratitude (2020)	Lighthouse (2023)

Gen Hoshino Singles Box: Gratitude (Japanese pronunciation: [ɕiꜜŋgɯɾɯ boꜜkkɯ̥sɯ gɯɾatitɕɯꜜːdo]) is a box set by Japanese singer-songwriter and musician Gen Hoshino, released by Speedstar Records on October 21, 2020, to commemorate Hoshino's tenth anniversary as a solo artist. It compiles Hoshino's first eleven numbered singles, from "Kudaranai no Naka ni" (2011) to "Doraemon" (2018). The singles are unaltered from their original releases and include reissues of their first edition extra DVDs. The box features its own extra CD and DVD In Gratitude, comprising miscellaneous songs, audio commentary from Hoshino and director Santa Yamagishi, and unreleased archive footage. Commercially, Gratitude was placed as the 78th best-selling album of 2020 by Oricon and as the 63rd by Billboard Japan. On the weekly charts, it peaked at number four on Oricon and number three on Billboard.

== Overview ==
The box set's contents

Gen Hoshino Singles Box: Gratitude compiles Hoshino's first eleven numbered singles, released from 2011 to 2018: "Kudaranai no Naka ni" (2011), "Film" (2012), "Yume no Soto e" (2012), "Shiranai" (2012), "Gag" (2013), "Why Don't You Play in Hell?" (2013), the double A-side "Crazy Crazy" / "Sakura no Mori" (2014), "Sun" (2015), "Koi" (2016), "Family Song" (2017), and "Doraemon" (2018). The singles are unaltered from their first editions, featuring the same track listings and DVD video extras. The box is bundled with the CD and DVD In Gratitude. The CD is comprised by miscellaneous songs, including "Halfway" and "Dancing on the Inside" (2020) – both written during and inspired by the COVID-19 pandemic – the theme song "Non Stop" (2016) to the Fuji Television program of the same name, the Suzuki Matsuo film 108: Kaiba Gorō no Fukushū to Bōken (2019) main theme "Yoru no Boat", jingles self-written by Hoshino for his segment on radio program All Night Nippon (2016–), and other unreleased songs and audio. The DVD includes video of Hoshino and director Santa Yamagishi looking back on highlights from the first edition DVDs, as well as unreleased archive footage. The set was bundled with a twelve-pack of postcards based on the cover and those of the eleven singles.

== Promotion and reception ==
Hoshino announced the box set on June 23, 2020, and unveiled its track listing and packaging on August 8. A trailer was uploaded to Hoshino's YouTube channel on September 29, previewing the first edition DVDs and In Gratitude. Gen Hoshino Singles Box: Gratitude was released by the Victor Entertainment label Speedstar Records on October 21, 2020, in commemoration of Hoshino's tenth anniversary as a solo artist. In July, Hoshino would also celebrate the anniversary by revisiting the Shibuya Club Quattro – where he had toured for his debut album Baka no Uta (2010) – to perform the online concert Gen Hoshino's 10th Anniversary Concert: Gratitude.

Emi Sugiura of Rockin'On Japan wrote positively of the Gratitude box set, calling it a "must-have" for deeply understanding Hoshino and his musicality, and praised the work of director Yamagishi for providing crucial commentary and creating a "luxurious box with valuable live footage". Commercially, Gratitude sold 44,378 copies in Japan around its week of release, debuting at number four on Oricon's Albums Chart and number three on Billboard Japan's Hot Albums. By the end of October, sales had moved to 47,637, making it the eight best-selling album that month according to Oricon. Oricon placed Gratitude as the 78th best-selling album of 2020, whereas Billboard Japan named it at number 63. Gratitude spent nine weeks total on Oricon's weekly chart, which accounted 51,905 total sales. It made four total appearances on Billboard Japan's Hot Albums chart, and performanced identically on their Top Albums Sales ranking.

== Track listing ==
All tracks are written by Gen Hoshino. Track listing adapted from Tower Records Japan.

"Kudaranai no Naka ni" CD
No.	Title	Length
1.	"Kudaranai no Naka ni"	4:19
2.	"Uta o Utau Toki wa"	2:31
3.	"Yuge"	2:55
4.	"Blanco" (House Version)	4:45
5.	"Kuse no Uta" (House Version)	4:46
Total length:		19:16

"Kudaranai no Naka ni" DVD, Kudaranai no Nakami
No.	Title	Length
1.	"Kudaranai no Naka ni" (Music Video)
2.	"Kuse no Uta" (Music Video)
3.	"'Baka no Uta o Tsukuru, Kanzen-ban' 'First Single & MV Seisaku Fūkei', Hoka" (Documentary)
4.	"Hatsu Kōkai Solo Live Eizō nado" (Live)

"Film" CD
No.	Title	Length
1.	"Film"	4:51
2.	"Moshi mo"	3:27
3.	"Ranshi"	3:28
4.	"Tsugi wa Nani ni Umaremashō ka" (House Version)	2:21
5.	"Rakka" (House Version)	2:49
Total length:		16:56

"Film" DVD, Film no Video
No.	Title	Length
1.	"Film" (Music Video)
2.	"Nichijō" (Music Video)
3.	"Hoshino Gen no Episode 1 @ SHIBUYA-AX 2011.10.02" (Live)
4.	"Recording & Music Video Making" (Documentary)
5.	"Hoshino Gen in Taiwan" (Documentary)

"Yume no Soto e" CD
No.	Title	Length
1.	"Yume no Soto e"	3:52
2.	"Parody"	4:26
3.	"Anata"	4:01
4.	"Denpa Tō" (House Version)	3:21
Total length:		15:40

"Yume no Soto e" DVD, Yume no Soto e no Naka e
No.	Title	Length
1.	"Yume no Soto e" (Music Video)
2.	"Hoshino Gen no Zenkoku Tour, Episode 2 Ikō" (Live)
3.	"Recording & Music Video Making nado" (Documentary)

"Shiranai" CD
No.	Title	Length
1.	"Shiranai"	4:51
2.	"Dancer"	3:13
3.	"Kisetsu"	3:54
4.	"Omokage" (House Version)	2:59
Total length:		14:57

"Shiranai" DVD, Video no Stranger
No.	Title	Length
1.	"Hoshino Gen no Hibiya Yagai Dai Ongaku Dō One-Man Live" (Live)
2.	"Recording & Music Video Making" (Documentary)
3.	"August 2012 ni Guest Shutsuen Shita Beach Boys no Rainichi Kōen no Uragawa nado"

"Gag" CD
No.	Title	Length
1.	"Gag"	4:42
2.	"Dust"	3:47
Total length:		8:29

"Why Don't You Play in Hell?" CD
No.	Title	Length
1.	"Why Don't You Play in Hell?"	3:46
2.	"Why Don't You Play in Hell?" (Karaoke)	3:40
Total length:		7:26

"Why Don't You Play in Hell?" DVD, Tanoshī Jigoku da yori
No.	Title	Length
1.	"Bakemono" (Music Video)
2.	"Hoshino Gen One-Man no Aki: Zepp Tokyo-hen" (Live)
3.	"Hoshino Gen no Shiwasu" (Live)
4.	"Recording & Music Video Making nado" (Documentary)

"Crazy Crazy" / "Sakura no Mori" CD
No.	Title	Length
1.	"Crazy Crazy"	3:36
2.	"Sakura no Mori"	5:12
3.	"Night Troop"	3:26
4.	"Umi o Sukū"	3:34
Total length:		15:48

"Crazy Crazy" / "Sakura no Mori" DVD, Crazy Disc
No.	Title	Length
1.	"Kinkyū Tokubetsu Bangumi: Hoshino Gen Ninki Song Top 10"
2.	"Barabara" (Live)
3.	"Film" (Live)
4.	"Recording" (Documentary)

"Sun" CD
No.	Title	Length
1.	"Sun"	4:04
2.	"Moon Sick"	2:39
3.	"Ichi Ni San"	3:44
4.	"Mad Men"	3:08
Total length:		13:35

"Sun" DVD, Sun Disc
No.	Title	Length
1.	"Tokubetsu Bangumi (Sono Ato no Nise Akira)"
2.	"Ichi Ni San" (Rec. Making)
3.	"Recording" (Documentary)
4.	"Gensen Live" (Victor Rock Festival 2015)

"Koi" CD
No.	Title	Length
1.	"Koi"	4:13
2.	"Drinking Dance"	3:40
3.	"Continues"	4:26
4.	"Amaoto" (House Version)	4:01
Total length:		16:20

"Koi" DVD, Koi Video
No.	Title	Length
1.	"Tokubetsu Bangumi (Nise Akira, Ishigakijima e Iku!)"
2.	"Metrock 2016 Eizō"

"Family Song" CD
No.	Title	Length
1.	"Family Song"	5:24
2.	"Hada"	3:59
3.	"Purin"	2:25
4.	"Kids" (House Version)	3:34
Total length:		15:22

"Family Song" DVD, Home Video
No.	Title	Length
1.	"Shinshun Live 2 Days, Yellow Pacific Live Eizō"
2.	"Purin" (Recording Documentary)

"Doraemon" CD
No.	Title	Length
1.	"Doraemon"	3:59
2.	"Koko ni Inai Anata e"	4:56
3.	"The Shower"	3:53
4.	"Doraemon no Uta" (House Version)	3:56
Total length:		16:44

"Doraemon" DVD, ViVi Video
No.	Title	Length
1.	"Nise Akira o Ski ni Tsurete tte"
2.	"Gensen Hikigatari Eizō" (TV Asahi Dream Festival)

In Gratitude CD
No.	Title	Length
1.	"Halfway"	3:04
2.	"Mellow 1" (All Night Nippon Radio Jingle)	0:23
3.	"Non Stop"	3:41
4.	"Up Tempo" (All Night Nippon Radio Jingle)	0:25
5.	"Dancing on the Inside" (Potluck Mix)	1:30
6.	"Funk" (All Night Nippon Radio Jingle)	0:16
7.	"Yoru no Boat"	3:38
8.	"Slow" (All Night Nippon Radio Jingle)	0:18
9.	"Ichi Ni San" (featuring Nise Akira)	0:41
10.	"Real" (featuring Usuno Haruo and Miyabi Mamoru)	3:06
11.	"Metal" (All Night Nippon Radio Jingle)	0:21
12.	"Dancing on the Inside"	0:58
13.	"Mellow 2" (All Night Nippon Radio Jingle)	0:24
14.	"Ai no Sei" (featuring Tamio Okuda)	4:40
15.	"Kuse no Uta" (Hoshino Gen no All Night Nippon Solo 10th Anniversary SP 2020.6.23)	5:35
Total length:		29:00

In Gratitude DVD
No.	Title	Length
1.	"Arigatō 10-nen"
2.	"Aru Hi no Hoshino Gen"

== Charts ==
=== Weekly charts ===
Weekly chart performance for Gen Hoshino Singles Box: Gratitude (2020–21)
Chart (2020–21)	Peak position
Japanese Albums (Oricon)	4
Japanese Combined Albums (Oricon)	4
Japanese Hot Albums (Billboard Japan)	3

=== Year-end charts ===
2020 year-end chart performance for Gen Hoshino Singles Box: Gratitude
Chart (2020)	Position
Japanese Albums (Oricon)	78
Japanese Top Albums Sales (Billboard Japan)	63
