= Two Beat in Yokohama Arena =

Video (live) by Gen Hoshino
- Released: March 25, 2015
- Recorded: December 16–17, 2014
- Venue: Yokohama Arena, Kanagawa Prefecture, Japan
- Length: 4:14:00
- Language: Japanese
- Label: Speedstar

Gen Hoshino video chronology
Stranger in Budokan (2014)	Two Beat in Yokohama Arena (2015)	Live Tour: Yellow Voyage (2016)

Two Beat in Yokohama Arena (ツービート IN 横浜アリーナ, Tsūbīto in Yokohama Arīna) (Japanese pronunciation: [tsɯːbiꜜːtoꜜ iꜜɴ jokohama aɾiꜜːna]) is the second live video album by Japanese singer-songwriter and musician Gen Hoshino, released via Speedstar Records on May 25, 2015. The album compiles both days of Hoshino's 2014 concert of the same name at Kanagawa Prefecture's Yokohama Arena, performed as a final celebration to Hoshino's recovery from a subarachnoid hemorrhage that had left him in hiatus for the majority of 2013. Released with an additional concert documentary, the album peaked at number 12 and 13 on Oricon's Japanese DVD and Blu-ray charts, respectively, charting for over 60 weeks on both.

== Background ==
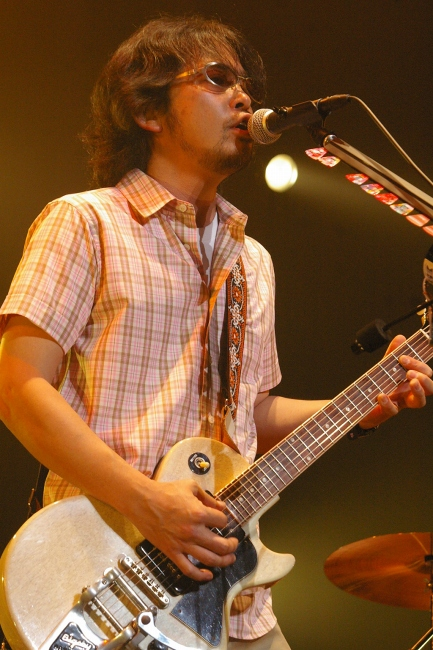
Tamio Okuda featured as a guest act on the Hikigatari Day of Two Beat in Yokohama Arena.

At the end of December 2012, Gen Hoshino went into a three-month hiatus after collapsing to a subarachnoid hemorrhage. Shortly after his return with the announcement of the album Stranger (2013) and single "Gag" (2013) for release in quick succession, a reinspection revealed a relapse in the hemorrhage, putting Hoshino into a second recuperation for six months. Amidst this period, he wrote the lyrics to "Why Don't You Play in Hell?" (2013) and created a draft melody to a ballad that would later be reworked into "Crazy Crazy" (2014).

In February 2014, Hoshino officially returned from his hiatus with a performance at the Nippon Budokan in promotion Stranger, which was released as the video album Stranger in Budokan (2014). He followed the performance with the Fukkatsu Live Tour in March to April, celebrating his complete recovery. Finally on August 8, 2014, Hoshino announced Two Beat in Yokohama Arena, his first concert at Kanagawa's Yokohama Arena, as a "fitting wrap to his year of recovery" according to Natalie.mu reporters. The concert was divided into two days: the Hikigatari Day (弾き語りDay; lit. "Acoustic Day") on December 16, 2014, and the Band Day (バンドDay) on December 17. The Hikigatari Day featured Japanese musician Tamio Okuda formerly of Unicorn as a guest act, who together with Hoshino performed covers of Okuda's "Sasurai" (1998), Puffy AmiYumi's "Mother" (1997), and debuted an original song titled "Ai no Sei" (愛のせい; lit. Love's Fault). The Band Day featured Ryosuke Nagaoka on guitar, Takuji Nomura on piano, Eiko Ishibashi on marimba and keyboard, Wataru Iga of Benzo on bass, and Hoshino's Sakerock co-member Diachi Ito on drums.

== Release and reception ==
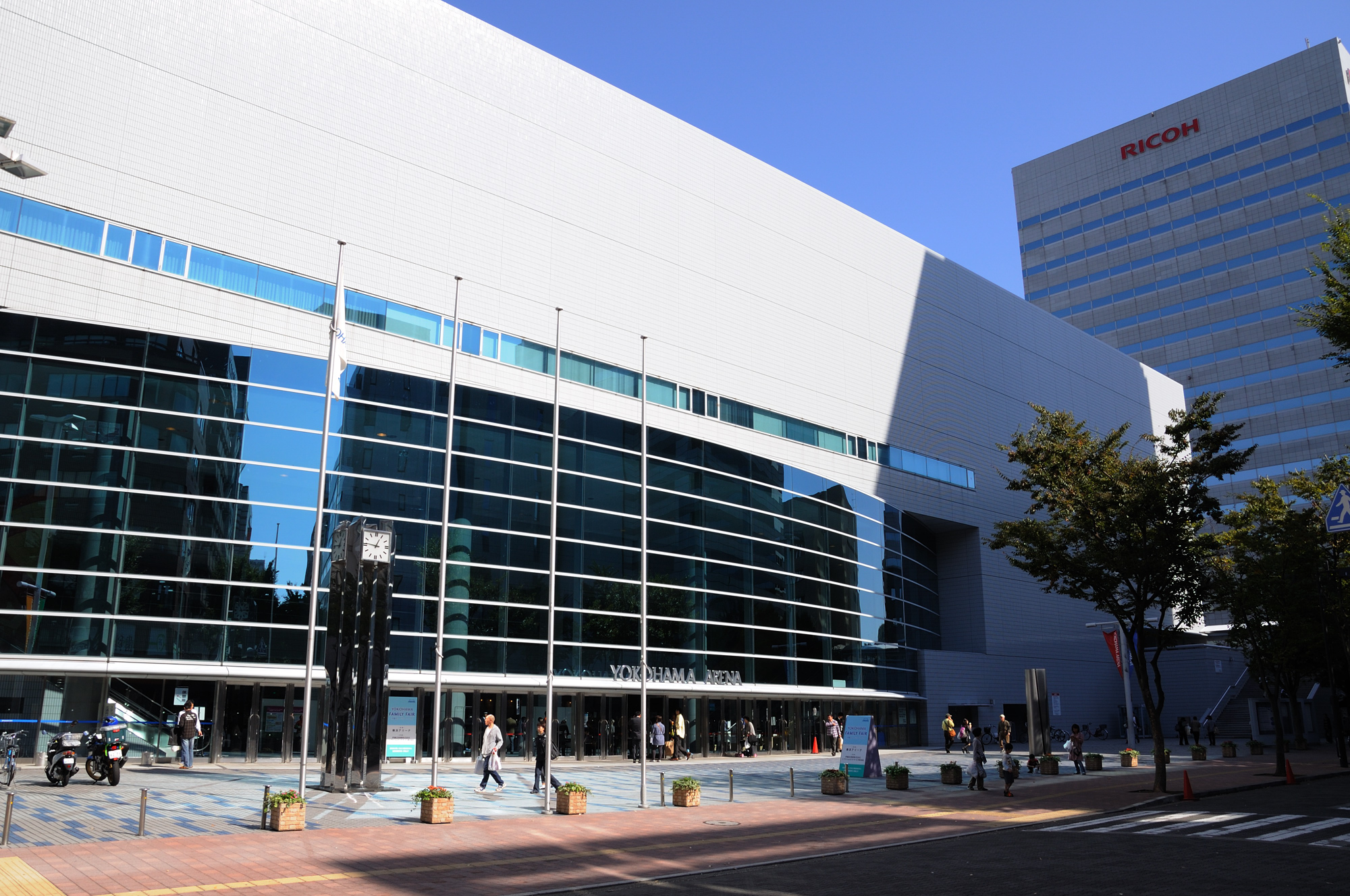
The Yokohama Arena in 2012

Alongside the conclusion of the concert, it was announced that the Band Day would be broadcast via Wowow Live on January 18, 2015. On February 13, 2015, Hoshino announced that both days of the concert would be released as a video album under the same name. Two Beat in Yokohama Arena was released on March 23, 2015, via Victor Entertainment's Speedstar Records. Issued in both Blu-ray and DVD versions, the second disc adds the documentary Yokohama no Hoshi, Arena Shijō-hatsu no Kiseki (横浜の星 ~アリーナ史上初の奇跡~; lit. "The Star of Yokohama: The Arena's First Miracle"), following Hoshino throughout the concert, and audio commentary from Hoshino and his staff is included on both discs. First editions were released with a booklet of interviews and behind-the-scene photos, and copies bought from select Japanese record stores would come with differing stickers.

Commercially, Two Beat in Yokohama Arena peaked at number 12 on Oricon's Japanese DVD chart and number 13 on their Blu-ray ranking, charting for 64 and 66 weeks total, respectively. Ishida, a staff reviewer for Tower Records Japan, wrote that they never bored of the release, describing it as "high in volume" due to its "calm" acoustic section, the "dancing and singing" Band Day, and the additional staff audio commentary.

== Personnel ==
Main performers adapted from Rockin'On Japan's report of the performance's second day.

- Gen Hoshino – vocals, guitar
- Ryosuke Nagaoka – guitar
- Takuji Nomura – piano
- Wataru Iga – bass
- Daichi Ito – drums
- Eiko Ishibashi – marimba, keyboard, miscellaneous
- Tamio Okuda – guest act; vocals, guitar

== Track listing ==
All tracks are written by Gen Hoshino expect where otherwise noted.

Disc one – Hikigatari Day

1. "Uta o Utau Toki wa" – 2:44
2. "Gag" – 4:30
3. "Bakemono" – 2:57
4. "Kuse no Uta" – 4:55
5. "Record Noise" – 5:19
6. "Film" – 4:24
7. "Kudaranai no Naka ni" – 4:27
8. "Ana o Horu" – 4:19
9. "Night Troop" – 4:06
10. "Why Don't You Play in Hell?" – 5:17
11. "Ichiryū Musician kara no O Iwai Message" – 1:56
12. "Hirameki" – 2:58
13. "Fuyu Koe" (Haruomi Hosono) – 3:56
14. "Tōmei Shōjo" (Shutoku Mukai) – 4:10
15. "Rōfūfu" – 2:14
16. "Ichiryū Musician kara no O Iwai Message" – 2:19
17. "Sasurai" (Tamio Okuda) – 3:51
18. "Mother" (Okuda) – 4:27
19. "Ai no Sei" (Hoshino, Okuda) – 5:32
20. "Ichiryū Musician kara no O Iwai Message" – 1:46
21. "Sakura no Mori" – 5:50
22. "Work Song" – 4:01
23. "Yume no Soto e" – 4:01
24. "Barabara" – 4:10
25. "Crazy Crazy" (Encore) – 4:33
26. "Stranger" (Encore) – 2:41

Disc two – Band Day

1. "Daisy Omisoshiru" (Instrumental) – 2:21
2. "Gag" – 4:38
3. "Bakemono" – 2:48
4. "Ana o Horu" – 3:48
5. "Moshi mo" – 3:55
6. "Step" – 3:36
7. "Night Troop" – 3:51
8. "Kuse no Uta" – 4:53
9. "Mirai" – 3:31
10. "Kudaranai no Naka ni" – 4:52
11. "Ichiryū Musician kara no O Iwai Message" – 2:30
12. "Hirameki" – 2:53
13. "Skirt" – 3:35
14. "Rōfūfu" – 2:18
15. "Ai no Sei" (Hoshino, Okuda) – 4:20
16. "Ichiryū Musician kara no O Iwai Message" – 5:07
17. "Sayōnara no Umi" (Instrumental) – 2:31
18. "Record Noise" – 6:39
19. "Work Song" – 3:29
20. "Kyōdai" – 2:40
21. "Why Don't You Play in Hell?" – 4:36
22. "Yume no Soto e" – 3:41
23. "Sakura no Mori" – 6:21
24. "Kimi wa Bara yori Utsukushī" (Kenji Kadoya, Mickie Yoshino) (Encore) – 9:11
25. "Crazy Crazy" (Encore) – 4:15
26. "Documentary: Yokohama no Hoshi, Arena Shijō-hatsu no Kiseki"

Total length: 4:14:00

Notes

- All tracks on the second disc minus the documentary are subtitled with "(Band Day (2014.12.17))".

== Charts ==
Weekly chart performance for Two Beat in Yokohama Arena (2015)
Chart (2015)	Peak position
Japanese DVDs (Oricon)	12
Japanese Blu-ray Discs (Oricon)	13

== Release history ==
Release history for Two Beat in Yokohama Arena
Region	Date	Edition	Format	Label	Catalogue code	Ref.
Japan	March 25, 2015	Standard	Blu-ray	Speedstar Records	VIXL-148~149	
Japan	March 25, 2015	Standard	DVD	Speedstar Records	VIBL-767~768	
Japan	March 25, 2015	Limited	Blu-ray	Speedstar Records	VIZL-826	
Japan	March 25, 2015	Limited	DVD	Speedstar Records	VIZL-827	
