= Why Don't You Play in Hell? (song) =

2013 single by Gen Hoshino

Single by Gen Hoshino

from the album Yellow Dancer
- Language: Japanese
- Released: October 2, 2013
- Length: 3:46
- Label: Speedstar
- Songwriter: Gen Hoshino
- Producer: Gen Hoshino

Gen Hoshino singles chronology
"Gag" (2013)	"Why Don't You Play in Hell?" (2013)	"Crazy Crazy" / "Sakura no Mori" (2014)

Music video
- "Why Don't You Play in Hell?" (Official Video) on YouTube

"Why Don't You Play in Hell?" (Japanese: 地獄でなぜ悪い, Hepburn: Jigoku de Naze Warui; lit. "What's Bad About Hell?") (Japanese pronunciation: [dʑigokɯ de naꜜze waɾɯꜜi]) is a song by Japanese singer-songwriter and musician Gen Hoshino from his fourth studio album, Yellow Dancer (2015). It was released through Speedstar Records on October 2, 2013, as the first single from the album. A track with elements of jazz and blues, it was written and self-produced by Hoshino as the main theme to the Sion Sono film of the same name. Lyrically, it compares daily life to hell and sings that people must therefore take on their challenges.

The single was announced in July 2013 and released while Hoshino was on a hiatus due to a subarachnoid hemorrhage, discovered a week after he had finished writing the song's lyrics. Upon release, the single took number five on the Oricon and Billboard Japan weekly singles charts and ended at number 20 on Oricon's monthly ranking of October. "Why Don't You Play in Hell?" received positive reception from music critics, who praised its theme. The music video to the song, directed by Hoshino and animated by Naoyuki Asano, was released to video platforms in September and follows a hospitalized boy who fantasizes of fighting monsters as a muscular hero. It won Best Video from a Film at the 2014 Japanese MTV Awards. The song has been included on the setlists for several of Hoshino's concerts and tours. Hoshino was intended to perform it at the 75th NHK Kōhaku Uta Gassen in 2024, but altered his song choice after criticism regarding its connection to Sono, who had been accused of sexual misconduct in 2022.

== Background ==
"Why Don't You Play in Hell?" is the main theme to the film of the same name, directed by Sion Sono. Sono approached Gen Hoshino, who was already working on the film as a cast member, to write its theme song. Hoshino's immediate idea was to recycle the "age-old" concept of creating a theme song bearing the same title as its accompanying work and wanted to "properly incorporate" the world of the film into the track. Musically, he wished to "explore and build on [his] roots", such as on the soul and jazz music he had often listened to when younger. Hoshino wrote the lyrics to the song in June 2013, while hospitalized for a temporary inspection of a subarachnoid hemorrhage he had suffered earlier in the year. A week after he had finished the lyrics, the inspection revealed a relapse in the hemorrhage, putting Hoshino into a hiatus.

== Composition and lyrics ==
"Why Don't You Play in Hell?" lasts for three minutes and forty-six seconds. According to sheet music from Shinko Music, the song is set in a tempo of 126 beats per minute and primarily composed in the key of E minor, with a switch to F minor in the outro. It was written, arranged, and produced by Hoshino, who also provided vocals, marimba, tambourine, and clapping. Satoru Takeshima assisted in clapping and played tenor saxophone, Diachi Ito (co-member to Hoshino in the instrumental band Sakerock) played the song's drums, Ryosuke Nagaoka provided the song with guitar, and Suga Dairo played the piano. Four musicians, including Yu Sugino, collectively played violin, and two others provided performances on viola. The track also features Naofumi Takimoto on trombone, Taichiro Kawasaki on trumpet, and Wataru Iga of the band Benzo on bass guitar.

"Why Don't You Play in Hell?"
A sample of the chorus to the song. With musical elements of jazz and blues, the song describes life as hell and asserts that people must therefore take on challenges.

A staff reviewer for CDJournal wrote that "Why Don't You Play in Hell?" mixes a feeling of "drifting" and "fluttering" with old-style blues, whereas the lyrics combine "Hoshino's personal experiences with fantasy". It is a jazzy track, led by a fast-paced beat alongside lively piano and horn sections, accompanied by Hoshino's upbeat vocals. Real Sound's Akimasa Munekata noted a New Orleans-style throughout the song. Daisuke Koyanagi of Rockin'On Japan wrote that it is a tough song with a crazy beat for "surviving hell with laughs".

The lyrics of the song describe day-to-day life, filled with "unresistable difficulties", as hell. It asserts that people must therefore "boldly" take on challenges, according to an analysis by Tower Records Japan writer Hamaguchi. Elio Mitsushima, in an article for BadCats Weekly, wrote that the song's "mad" chorus (with lyrics such as "In my dreams, I am always running from pain / I remember only that girl's naked warmth") illustrates a truly insane world where life is constant hell but with occasional good happenings, rather than a life that is only occasionally hell. She continued that the implications of these lyrics "immediately" changed when considering Hoshino's hospitalization. Hoshino wrote about the song on his website (referring to his hiatus due to the hemorrhage): "This song, while the theme to the movie, is also my personal [theme song]. [...] I wrote it before anything happened, but its lyrics somehow expressed my current situation."

== Release and music video ==
The song was announced for a single release in July 2013, alongside a preview in a trailer for the film. "Why Don't You Play in Hell?" was released by the Victor Entertainment label Speedstar Records on October 2, 2013. It is Hoshino's sixth single overall, released while he was still on hiatus due to his hemorrhage. The single features the titular track and its karaoke (instrumental) version, included since Hoshino wanted listeners to hear the "interesting" recording. The cover art, created by Nanpei Kaneko, features an illustration of Hoshino in-costume as his film character. First editions included Tanoshī Jigoku da yori (楽しい地獄だより; lit. "From the Fun Hell"), a DVD video directed by Santa Yamagishi. The video compiles the music video for the song "Bakemono", live performances from the tours Hoshino Gen One-Man no Aki and Hoshino Gen no Shiwasu, and a behind-the-scenes documentary to the single's recording and music video. "Why Don't You Play in Hell?" was re-released as the seventh track of Hoshino's fourth studio album, Yellow Dancer, on December 2, 2015.

The song's music video was directed by Hoshino and animated by Naoyuki Asano, known for work on Doraemon: Nobita and the New Steel Troops—Winged Angels (2011) and Saint Young Men (2013). The video was released on September 20, 2013, to Victor Entertainment's YouTube channel and Hoshino's newly created Niconico account. It follows a hospitalized middle school boy, who fantasizes of a world where he is a muscular action hero that fights monsters and is popular with women. The video is intersected with a trailer for Tanoshī Jigoku da yori, and it ends with a real-life shot of a cameraman asking Hoshino – in a hospital bed recovering from his hemorrhage – if he is okay; in response, he lifts a trembling arm and gives a peace sign. The video won the award for Best Video from a Film at the 2014 MTV Video Music Awards Japan.

== Reception ==
"Why Don't You Play in Hell?" received positive reviews from music critics in Japan. Koyanagi of Rockin'On Japan praised Hoshino's songwriting for creating a track with cogency that could only be made from "complete understanding". Hagamuchi, in a short review for Tower Records Japan, recommended the song to people who presently face many troubles. Taking away from the song, he wrote: "It isn't just you; we are all living in the same hell." Mitsushima of BadCats Weekly selected "Why Don't You Play in Hell?" as the song that best showcases the personality and celebrity of Hoshino. Mitsushima wrote that, throughout its stupidity, the song meets the definition of entertainment by giving people courage, and praised Hoshino as an entertainer. CDJournal staff opined that the song's "heart-plucking" mix of "old blues" was its main appeal, and called its lyrics fun for blending reality with fantasy.

Commercially, "Why Don't You Play in Hell?" sold 25,355 copies in Japan within its first week of release, opening at a peak position of number five on Oricon's weekly Singles Chart. It was the 20th best-selling single for October 2013. In September, the single had debuted at number 49 on Billboard Japan's Adult Contemporary Airplay chart and at number 73 on the Hot 100; upon its October release, the song rose to number three and five, respectively. In total, it charted for six weeks on the Hot 100 and seven weeks on the airplay chart. On Billboard's Top Singles Sales Chart, it made five appearances and peaked at number three. The song continued to chart on Oricon's ranking, reaching 37,200 total sales, before making its final appearance within the top 200 in June 2014. On Oricon, "Why Don't You Play in Hell?" charted for 17 weeks total.

== Live performances ==
Hoshino gave a debut performance of "Why Don't You Play in Hell?" at the Nippon Budokan in February 2014, as part of the touring effort for his third album Stranger (2013). It was the final song on the setlist, performed during an encore along with a cover of Akira Fuse's "Kimi wa Bara yori Utsukushī". In April 2014, the song again followed "Kimi wa Bara yori Utsukushī" during Hoshino's Fukkatsu Live Tour, which celebrated his full recovery from the hemorrhage.

Past its years of release, "Why Don't You Play in Hell?" has been included on the setlists for several of Hoshino's headlining concerts and tours. In 2015, it was performed with only an acoustic guitar during his Hitori Edge in Budokan concert. In 2023, this performance was uploaded to YouTube to promote its inclusion in the concert film Gen Hoshino Concert Recollections 2015–2023. Upon the release of Yellow Dancer, Hoshino embarked on the Yellow Voyage tour throughout 2016 to perform "Why Don't You Play in Hell?" and other tracks from the album. The song was also featured on the touring effort for his fifth album, Pop Virus (2018), throughout 2019.

=== Kōhaku Uta Gassen controversy ===
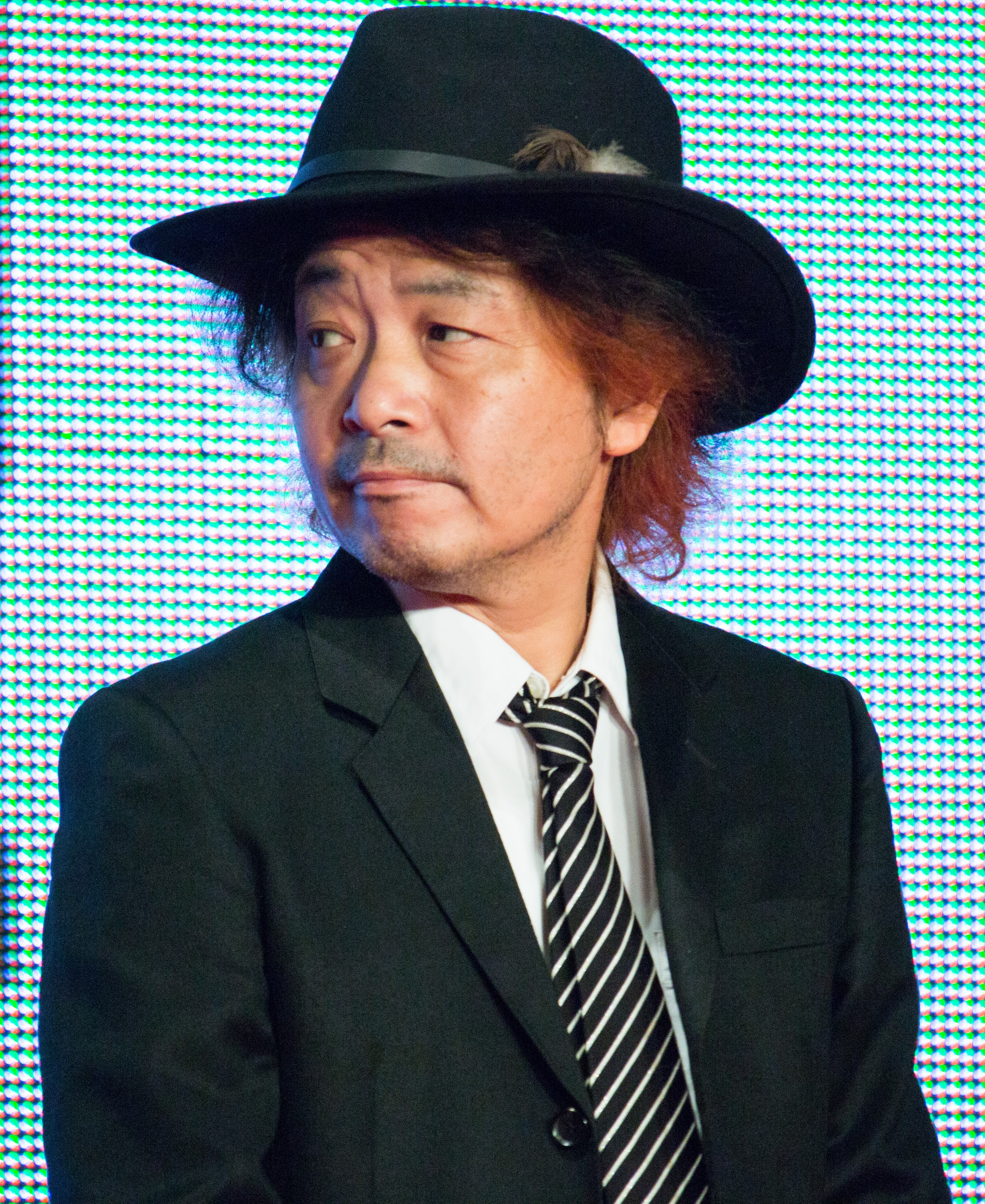
Accusations of sexual misconduct against film director Sono Sion (pictured in 2015) caused Hoshino to withdraw a scheduled performance of the song at the 75th Kōhaku Uta Gassen.

On December 23, 2024, Hoshino announced that he would perform an acoustic arrangement of "Why Don't You Play in Hell?" at the 75th Kōhaku Uta Gassen, an annual New Year's Eve music special broadcast by NHK. His tenth consecutive appearance on the special, the scheduled performance was promoted with a video of the song from the Pop Virus tour, which was released to YouTube. NHK specifically requested he perform "Why Don't You Play in Hell?", since they felt the song's message aligned with the 75th event's theme: "Songs for You" (あなたへの歌, Anata e no Uta).

Upon the announcement, the choice of "Why Don't You Play in Hell?" generated controversy due to the song's connection with Sono, who had been accused in 2022 of sexual misconduct towards women involved in his productions. According to journalist Hiroaki Saito, writing for Yahoo News! Japan, critics demanded a change in song choice, whereas fans of Hoshino argued against its perceived connection to Sono's film.

On December 25, Hoshino's timeslot was changed to "Barabara", a track from his debut album Baka no Uta (2010), following dicusssion between NHK and Hoshino's agency. Both released statements clarifying the alteration and controversy. The statement from Hoshino's team said that, despite the song not relating to Sono past its use as the film's theme song, they would not deny that its appearance at Kōhaku could constitute harm and had therefore replaced it with "Barabara"; they concluded with a denouncement of sexual assault.

== Track listing ==
All tracks are written by Gen Hoshino.

Regular edition

1. "Why Don't You Play in Hell?" – 3:46
2. "Why Don't You Play in Hell?" (Karaoke) – 3:39

Total length: 7:25

First edition (DVD – Tanoshī Jigoku da yori)

1. "Bakemono" (Music Video)
2. "Hoshino Gen One-Man no Aki: Zepp Tokyo-hen" (Live)
3. "Hoshino Gen no Shiwasu" (Live)
4. "Recording & Music Video Making, nado" (Documentary)

== Personnel ==
Credits primarily adapted from Apple Music.

Performing musicians

- Gen Hoshino – vocals, clapping, marimba, tambourine
- Satoru Takeshima – tenor saxophone, clapping
- Daichi Ito (of Sakerock) – drums
- Mikiko Ise – violin
- Mio Okamura – violin
- Osamu Iyoku – violin
- Yu Sugino – violin
- Kaoru Hagiwara – viola
- Mikiyo Kikuchi – viola
- Ryosuke Nagaoka – guitar
- Naofumi Takimoto – trombone
- Taichiro Kawasaki – trumpet
- Wataru Iga (of Benzo) – bass guitar
- Suga Dairo – piano

Technical and production

- Gen Hoshino – songwriting, arrangement, producer, music video director
- Takahiro Uchida – mastering engineer
- Nanpei Kaneko – cover artwork
- Naoyuki Asano – music video animation
- Santa Yamagishi – director (Tanoshī Jigoku da yori)

== Charts ==
Weekly chart performance for "Why Don't You Play in Hell?"
Chart (2013–14)	Peak position
Japan (Billboard Japan Hot 100)	5
Japanese Adult Contemporary (Billboard Japan)	3
Japan (Oricon)	5

== Release history ==
Release dates and formats for "Why Don't You Play in Hell?"
Region	Date	Edition	Format(s)	Label	Catalogue code	Ref(s).
Japan	October 2, 2013	Standard	CD; rental CD	Speedstar Records	VICL-36835	
Japan	October 2, 2013	First/limited	CD+DVD	Speedstar Records	VIZL-590	
Various	June 23, 2015	Standard	Digital download	Speedstar Records	—N/a	
Various	August 30, 2019	Standard	Streaming	Speedstar Records	—N/a	
South Korea	August 30, 2019	Standard	Streaming	J-Box Entertainment	—N/a	
