= Same Thing =

Same Thing may refer to:

- Same Thing (EP), a 2019 EP by Gen Hoshino or the title track
- "Same Thing", a song by Flobots from Fight with Tools (2007)
- "Same Thing", a song by Jme from Integrity> (2015)
- "Same Thing", a song by Lil Baby from My Turn (2020)
- "Same Thing", a song by the Kid Laroi from F*ck Love (2020)
- "Same Thing", a song by Ken Carson from X (2022)
- "Same Thing", a 2023 song by Sukha
