= Two beat =

Two beat or two-beat may refer to:

- Two Beat, a Japanese comedy duo consisting of Takeshi Kitano and Kiyoshi Kaneko
- Two Beat in Yokohama Arena, a 2015 live album and concert by Gen Hoshino
- in music, a style that accentuates alternate beats in four-four time

== See also ==
- That Travelin' Two-Beat, a 1964 duet album by Bing Crosby and Rosemary Clooney
