= Episode (Gen Hoshino album) =

Studio album by Gen Hoshino
- Released: 28 September 2011
- Genre: J-pop; rock
- Length: 44:01
- Language: Japanese
- Label: Daisyworld; Speedstar
- Producer: Gen Hoshino

Gen Hoshino chronology
| Baka no Uta (2010) | Episode (2011) | Stranger (2013) |

Singles from Episode
- 1. "Kudaranai no Naka ni" Released: 2 March 2011

Episode (Japanese: エピソード, Hepburn: Episōdo) (Japanese pronunciation: [eꜜpisoːdo]) is the second studio album by Japanese singer-songwriter and musician Gen Hoshino. It was released in Japan on 28 September 2011 by Speedstar Records and Haruomi Hosono's Daisyworld. It is the follow-up to Baka no Uta (2010), Hoshino's debut as a solo artist. Episode reached number five on Oricon's Albums Chart. The only single from the album, "Kudaranai no Naka ni", was released on 2 March 2011.

== Reception ==
Episode was received positively by Japanese music critics, who praised the album's themes on daily life and Hoshino's songwriting. Hirokazu Koike at Rockin'On Japan wrote that the album contains Hoshino's view on death and current attitude. With a rich arrangement of piano, flugelhorn, and strings, Koike wrote that Episode's has a unique funk and swing style, reminiscent to Hoshino's instrumental band Sakerock. Backed by a warm folk-like sound, reviewers for CDJournal praised Hoshino's lyricism for discussing the ups and lows of everyday emotions, leaving a dark feeling with "rich aftertaste".

== Track listing ==
All tracks are written by Gen Hoshino

| No. | Title | Length |
|---|---|---|
| 1. | "Episode" (エピソード, Episōdo) | 2:10 |
| 2. | "Yuge" (湯気, "Steam") | 2:53 |
| 3. | "Kawaranai Mama" (変わらないまま, "Unchanging") | 3:40 |
| 4. | "Kudaranai no Naka ni" (くだらないの中に, "In the Nonsense") | 4:49 |
| 5. | "Futon" (布団, "Bedding") | 4:04 |
| 6. | "Baito" (バイト, "Part-Time Job") | 1:49 |
| 7. | "Eigyō" (営業, "Business") | 3:37 |
| 8. | "Step" (ステップ, Suteppu) | 2:58 |
| 9. | "Mirai" (未来, "Future") | 3:18 |
| 10. | "Kenka" (喧嘩, "Argument") | 3:08 |
| 11. | "Stove" (ストーブ, Sutōbu) | 3:20 |
| 12. | "Nichijō" (日常, "Everyday Life") | 4:39 |
| 13. | "Yosō" (予想, "Expectation") | 4:00 |
| Total length: | | 44:01 |

== Charts ==
Weekly chart performance for Episode (2011)
| Chart (2011) | Peak position |
|---|---|
| Japanese Albums (Oricon) | 5 |
| Japanese Top Albums Sales (Billboard Japan) | 6 |

Weekly chart performance for Episode (2016–17)
| Chart (2016–17) | Peak position |
|---|---|
| Japanese Albums (Oricon) | 52 |
| Japanese Hot Albums (Billboard Japan) | 41 |
| Taiwanese East Asian Albums (G-Music) | 11 |
