= Kudaranai no Naka ni =

2011 single by Gen Hoshino

- Standard edition cover

Single by Gen Hoshino

from the album Episode
- Language: Japanese
- B-side: "Uta o Utau Toki wa": "Yuge"; "Blanco"; "Kuse no Uta"
- Released: March 2, 2011
- Studio: Freedom (Shibuya); Sound DALI (Setagaya)
- Genre: J-pop; rock
- Length: 4:19
- Label: Daisyworld; Speedstar
- Songwriter: Gen Hoshino
- Producer: Gen Hoshino

Gen Hoshino singles chronology
"Kudaranai no Naka ni" (2011)	"Film" (2012)

Music video
- "Kudaranai no Naka ni" (Official Video) on YouTube

"Kudaranai no Naka ni" (Japanese: くだらないの中に; lit. "In the Nonsense") (Note: Alternatively romanized with the "ni" particle connected to "naka" as "Kudaranai no Nakani".) (Japanese pronunciation: [kɯdaɾanaꜜi no naꜜka ɲi]) is the debut single by Japanese musician Gen Hoshino, who self-produced and wrote it for his second studio album, Episode (2011). The single was released by the Daisyworld and Speedstar labels on March 2, 2011. It is a love song, composed with a calm, lonely sound. Reviewers attributed an erotic feel to the song and noted the mention of senses and feel in its lyrics. It peaked at No. 17 on Oricon's Singles Chart and at No. 12 on the Billboard Japan Hot 100, becoming the 44th best-selling single in its month of release.

== Composition and lyrics ==
Gen Hoshino came up with the chorus idea for "Kudaranai no Naka ni" in the shower and hurriedly wrote it down while still naked. Usually, he would pen lyrics at the same time as melody. He included the word 愛 (ai, love) in the final text, adding what he viewed as a sort of sweetness. Hoshino had not been a fan of the term "love song" and was embarrassed after it was attributed to his debut solo album Baka no Uta (2010). He thought singing of love directly was ridiculous and hoped to represent such emotions in his music without outright mention. However, looking at "Kudaranai no Naka ni", he ended up agreeing with the categorization and began referring to the single as his first "from-the-front love song".

"Kudaranai no Naka ni"
A sample from the intro. The song draws from Western jazz for a "heartwarming" and "lonely" sound, described as ballad by Hoshino.

With influences from the Western jazz that Hoshino's parents listened to when he was younger, "Kudaranai no Naka ni" is a "heartwarming" Japanese rock and pop song, described by Hoshino as a ballad with firm melody. It has a runtime of 4 minutes and 19 seconds, composed in the key of A-flat major per sheet music on At-Elise.com. The song is marked with the time signature of 4/4 and has a tempo of 74 beats per minute. A reviewer for CDJournal called the song's sound "lonely", supported by "bittersweet" lyrics that call upon the true meaning of the world.

Shinji Hyogo, editor for Rockin'On Japan, called the song fetishistic / erotic for seemingly prioritizing senses and feel over meaning, but did not believe that this was Hoshino's intention. Tower Records Japan's Satō, reviewing Episode (2011), called "Kudaranai no Naka ni" the song of a pervert, and wrote that it will make listeners realize they are also perverted themselves. As Hoshino was to perform "Kudaranai no Naka ni" and "Kuse no Uta" (2010) on a Music Station special in 2017, Real Sound's Natsuna Murakami wrote that the songs showcases a different style in Hoshino's music prior to dance tracks like "Sun" (2015) and "Koi" (2016), while still holding similarities in underlying happy themes and melody. For the lyrics, Murakami noted Hoshino usage of all five senses, with the line "We smelled each other's hair" (Note: "Kami no ke no nioi o kagi atte" (髪の毛の匂いを嗅ぎあって)) for example representing smell and "The sound of our hearts breaking" (Note: "Kokoro ga wareru oto" (心が割れる音)) representing hearing. She described his singing style on the tracks as more calm and slow, as if he was speaking to the listener.

"Kudaranai no Naka ni" was written, arranged, and self-produced by Hoshino, who also provided guitar. Other musicians assisted with performance of drums, bass, piano, trumpet, trombone, clarinet, and horn. The song was recorded by Naoyuki Uchida at Shibuya's Freedom Studio and Setagaya's Sound DALI Studio, whereas mastering was handled by Tanaka Mitsukazu at Bernie Grundman Mastering, also in Shibuya.

=== B-sides ===
Four B-sides were recorded for the song's single release. The first is "Uta o Utau Toki wa", covering topics of "rules, manners, ethics, principles, [and] logic", similar to songs from Sakerock. The second, "Yuge", takes a harsh approach in sound, the polar oppositie direction to "Kudaranai no Naka ni" according to Hoshino. Cinra's Takanori Kuroda called "Yuge" an early example of Hoshino blending African-American music influences into his work, a style later found on tracks such as "Sun". The last two B-sides are "Blanco" (a bundle bonus for the manga of the same name) and "Kuse no Uta" (from Baka no Uta). They are marked as House Versions; Hyogo (Rockin'On) speculated that this refers to their home, hikigatari recording, rather than to their musical style.

== Release and reception ==
"Kudaranai no Naka ni" was announced as a single in late December 2010. It was jointly issued by Haruomi Hosono's Daisyworld and Victor Entertainment's Speedstar Records on March 2, 2011, as Hoshino's debut single. First editions included the extra DVD Kudaranai no Nakami (Japanese: くだらないの中身; lit. "The Inside of the Uselessness"), directed by Santa Yamagishi, who had previously been in charge of video works for Hoshino's instrumental band Sakerock. The DVD has a runtime of about 70 minutes, featuring video clips from the music videos of "Kudaranai no Naka ni" and "Kuse no Uta", a documentary to the creation of Baka no Uta, and various live performances. Part of the song's music video was uploaded to Victor Entertainment's YouTube channel on March 9, intersected by a trailer for Kudaranai no Nakami. To promote the release, Hoshino held a talk event at a Shibuya Tower Records store, where was also performed "Henshū-sha no Uta". "Kudaranai no Naka ni" was included as the fourth track on Hoshino's second studio album, Episode, released September 28, 2011. It is the album's only single.

Tower Records reviewer Oguri called "Kudaranai no Naka ni" symbolic of Hoshino, and praised the song's gentle lyrics on everyday love, which they wrote would make listeners think that "there are no better loves songs". Hyogo (Rockin'On) complimented all songs on the single as good; for the title song, he wrote that it showcases an "important truth of life" through its lyrics on human sense, and highlighted the line where Hoshino calls not having hope "inconvenient" as skillful. Commercially, "Kudaranai no Naka ni" sold 5,294 copies upon release, taking peaks at No. 17 on Oricon's Singles Chart and No. 12 on Billboard Japan's Hot 100. On the contemporary airplay chart, it peaked at No. 15. Rising to 8,704 sales, it was the 44th best-selling single in March 2011 according to Oricon. The single has reappeared on the charts in later years; in early 2017, whilst Hoshino's "Koi" was charting in the top 10, "Kudaranai no Naka ni" took post-release peaks on the Hot 100 at No. 50 and on Oricon at No. 86. By April 2019, its most recent week on the charts, Oricon had reported a total of 16,838 sales.

== Personnel ==
Credits adapted from Apple Music and Daisyworld.

- Gen Hoshino – songwriting, arrangement, vocals, guitar, clapping, producer
- Daichi Ito (of Sakerock) – drums, clapping
- Wataru Iga (of Benzo) – bass, clapping
- Hiroaki Yokoyama – piano, clapping
- Teppei Kawakami – trumpet
- Naofumi Takimoto – trombone
- Satoru Takeshima – clarinet
- Tomoyo Shoji – horn
- Naoyuki Uchida – recording
- Tanaka Mitsukazu – mastering

== Track listing ==
1. "Kudaranai no Naka ni" – 4:19
2. "Uta o Utau Toki wa" – 2:31
3. "Yuge" – 2:55
4. "Blanco" (House Version) – 4:44
5. "Kuse no Uta" (House Version) – 4:45

Total length: 19:14

== Charts ==
Weekly chart performance for "Kudaranai no Naka ni" (2011)
Chart (2011)	Peak position
Japan (Oricon)	17
Japan (Billboard Japan Hot 100)	12
Japanese Adult Contemporary (Billboard Japan)	15

Weekly chart performance for "Kudaranai no Naka ni" (2016–19)
Chart (2016–19)	Peak position
Japan (Oricon)	86
Japan (Billboard Japan Hot 100)	50

== Release history ==
Release dates and formats for "Kudaranai no Naka ni"
Region	Date	Format	Label	Catalogue code	Ref(s).
Japan	March 2, 2011	CD	Daisyworld; Speedstar Records	VICL-36633	
Japan	March 2, 2011	CD+DVD	Daisyworld; Speedstar Records	VIZL-409	
Worldwide	March 2, 2011	Digital download	Speedstar Records	—N/a	
Worldwide	June 23, 2015	Streaming	Speedstar Records	—N/a	
