= Same Thing (EP) =

EP by Gen Hoshino
- Released: October 14, 2019
- Length: 14:06
- Language: Japanese; English
- Label: Speedstar
- Producer: Gen Hoshino; Superorganism; Rascal; Punpee; Tom Misch

Gen Hoshino chronology
Pop Virus (2018)	Same Thing (2019)	Gen Hoshino Singles Box: Gratitude (2020)

Same Thing (Japanese pronunciation: [seꜜːmɯ ɕiꜜŋgɯ]) is the debut extended play (EP) by Japanese singer-songwriter and musician Gen Hoshino, released by Speedstar Records on October 14, 2019. Hoshino's first collaborative work, it includes features from British indie pop band Superorganism, Japanese rapper Punpee, and English musician Tom Misch. The EP was developed after the commercial success of his fifth album Pop Virus (2018), which had left him unsure about how to proceed forward. He befriended the EP's collaborators during the album's touring effort and was inspired by the new ideas that came with co-writing music.

Hoshino wanted to focus on music in a pure sense, disconnected from sales, and found the recording process reminiscent of when he began writing music in middle school. It was initially envisioned as a mixtape release, but this plan was changed due to Hoshino believing the mixtape culture would be difficult to promote in Japan. He shares writing and production credits with Superorganism, Punpee, German producer Rascal, and Misch. Same Thing covers themes of solidarity and features bass-focused arrangement similar to the Western music scene. The track listing includes the indie pop title track with Superorganism featuring English lyrics, the Japanese rap song "Sarashi-mono" sung by Hoshino in conversation-like verses with Punpee, and "Ain't Nobody Know" featuring Misch, where Misch composed the beat and Hoshino wrote the melody to create a track that puts distance between their styles. Hoshino wrote the fourth and final track "Watashi" alone, featuring only his vocals and acoustic guitar.

The title track was released ahead as a promotional single on October 4, 2019. Music videos were produced for all tracks, and "Sarashi-mono" and "Ain't Nobody Know" also received lyric videos. Critics regarded Same Thing as a new style for Hoshino and praised its musical and lyrical themes. Upon release, it reached first place on the digital albums charts of both Oricon and Billboard Japan, and took numbers three and four on the Billboard Hot Albums and Oricon Combined Albums Charts, respectively. In its release week, all four songs appeared on the Billboard Japan Streaming Songs chart and all but "Watashi" made the Japan Hot 100. At the end of 2019, Same Thing ranked at numbers 48 and seven on Billboard Japan's year-end Hot Albums and Download Albums charts, respectively.

== Background and development ==
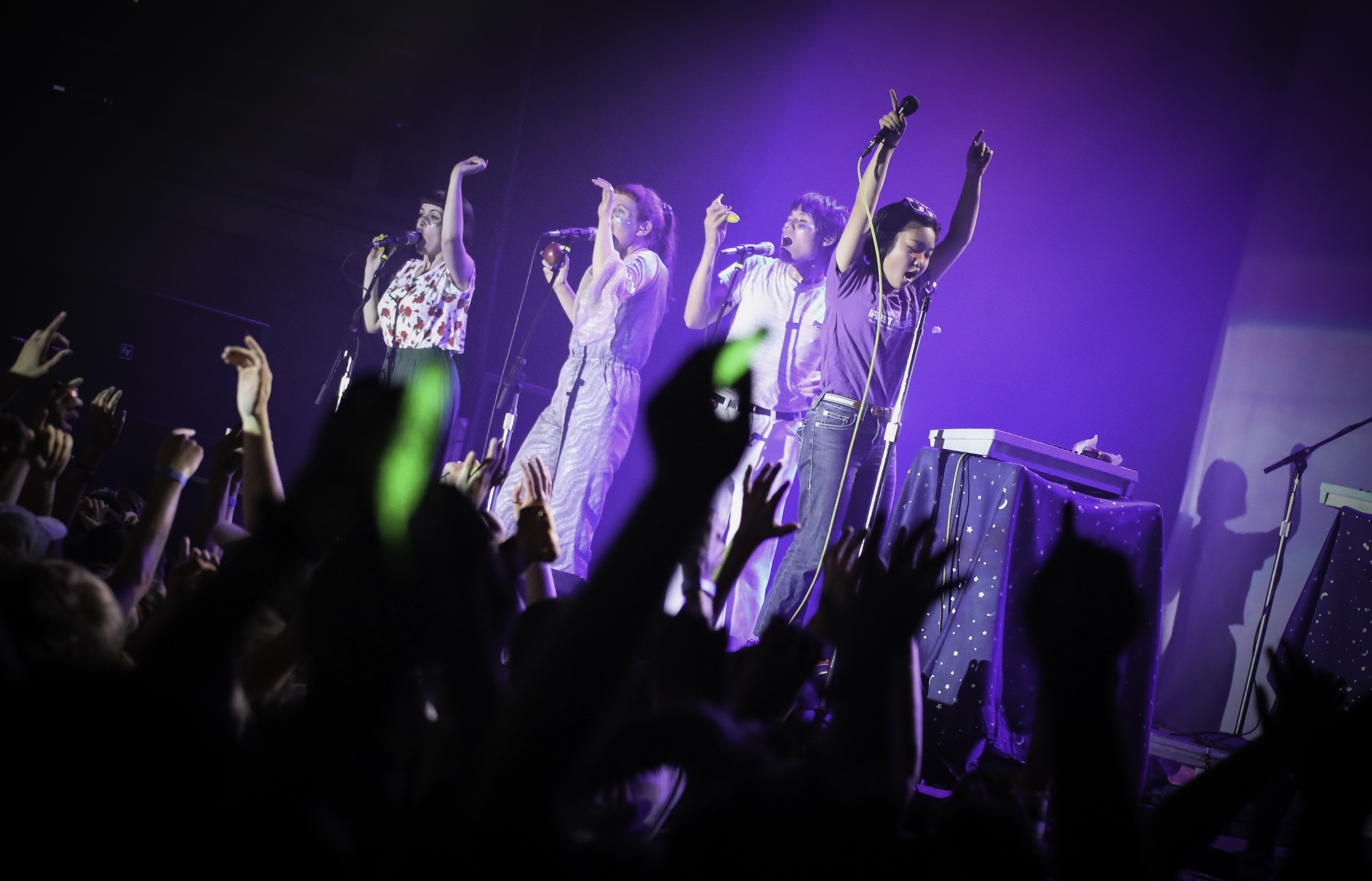
Same Thing is Hoshino's first collaborative work. British indie pop band Superorganism (pictured in 2018) features on the title track and was the first collaborator Hoshino recorded with.

After releasing his fifth studio album Pop Virus (2018), Hoshino planned to take an entire year off. His most commercially successful release, it topped the Billboard Japan Hot Albums chart for four weeks, and its three singles all charted atop the Hot 100. Hoshino described the album as a culmination of his career. By its completion, he was unsure how to proceed forward, unlike his previous albums which had left him wanting to attempt new projects immediately; at some points, he considered quitting music. During the album's domestic touring effort, Hoshino became friends with the British indie pop band Superorganism, Japanese rapper Punpee, and English musician Tom Misch. They began to talk about creating something together and Hoshino realized that he had never properly done a collaborative project during his solo career. He nonetheless found the concept interesting and quickly began to come up with new ideas, throwing out his plan for vacation.

Throughout 2019, Hoshino attempted to connect with new people, such as by releasing his discography for streaming and opening an Instagram account in August, writing in his first post in both Japanese and English: "I'm going to start a lot of things starting from today. In order to meet, connect with, and have fun with the people I love and people I haven't met yet." On October 4, 2019, Hoshino announced his debut extended play Same Thing, describing it as a pastime, challenge, and his "cry as a musician". Superorganism and Punpee were unveiled as collaborators on the same day; Misch was not announced until October 13, a day before the EP's release. Hoshino, Superorganism, Punpee, German producer Rascal (a regular collaborator of Punpee), and Misch are all credited as songwriters and producers on Same Thing. In production, Hoshino wished to face music in a pure sense, not focusing on sales and instead putting attention to creating music with friends. He initially recorded using his own money with the intent of releasing the songs as a mixtape; however, this plan ultimately fell through as Hoshino believed it would be hard to promote the mixtape culture in Japan.

Superorganism was the first collaborator Hoshino recorded with. He recalled to Billboard Japan that the process was reminiscent to when he began playing music with friends in middle school, a feeling he said continued into the recording sessions with Punpee and Misch. With Superorganism, they utilized a conference room and brought their own instruments and computers, as well as candy and game consoles to create the feeling of their own room. The lack of focus on sales made Hoshino more comfortable co-writing and producing the songs, unlike his previous work where had felt obligated to take the initiative himself, even during collaborations. He described the production as therapeutic.

== Composition and songs ==
Same Thing contains four songs with a total runtime of fourteen minutes and six seconds (14:06). The EP sees Hoshino moving from a self-constructed sound on Pop Virus to something more open towards collaboration and co-writing. Real Sound's Tomoyuki Mori wrote that it transitions from a Western-influenced but uniquely Japanese pop sound on Pop Virus into a sound that "directly links to the foreign scene". Solitude appears as a recurring theme in the lyrics and bass-focused arrangement appears throughout the track listing. Hirokazu Koike of Rockin'On Japan called the solitude one of expression, and described the EP as Hoshino announcing a "love-filled fuck you to the world" as he "[carves] departures into romantic songs".

"Same Thing"
The lyrics to the title track were written by Hoshino in Japanese and translated into English by Superorganism. It features an indie pop sound representative of the band.

"Watashi"
Contrasting to the collaborative EP, the final track "Watashi" was written solely by Hoshino and features only his vocals and acoustic guitar.

The title track "Same Thing" features Superorganism. It was written by Hoshino with arrangement by the band. Its lyrics are exclusively in English; Hoshino first wrote the text in Japanese, which was then translated by the members of Superorganism. Hoshino sings of feelings of love as he uses harsh slang to express irritation and dissatisfaction: "To everybody, fuck you" / "It's been on my mind" / "You know I meant it with love". The song uses the word fuck seven times in its lyrics, which has resulted in unedited versions being banned from broadcast; in its debut performance on Hoshino's variety show Ogen-san to Issho, fuck was censored by mouse squeeks. Musically, it features an early 2000s indie pop sound associated with Superorganism, with elements of psychedelia. "Sarashi-mono" is a Japanese rap song featuring Punpee, with Hoshino rapping for the first time in his career. Over a mellow beat and piano loop with gospel and New Orleans-influenced trumpet, Hoshino and Punpee discuss in conversation-like verses how they started music with solitude, and the uncertainty and gratification they gained alongside larger fanbases.

Hoshino co-produced the third song "Ain't Nobdody Know" with Misch. Misch sent the base track to Hoshino, who added its melody; as a result, the beat harks on Misch's style whilst the melody reminds of Hoshino, with a feeling of distance between the two according to Rockin'On's Tomohiro Ogawa. Misch's contributions includes guitar and keyboard bass inspired by soul, jazz, hip-hop, and electronic genres, backed by Hoshino singing with intimate soul-like falsetto. Concluding the collaborative EP, "Watashi" was written, produced, and arranged solely by Hoshino, who performed it on only vocals and acoustic guitar. Hoshino sings of hope and despair, discussing how he'd rather do something interesting than live without hope: "Rather than kill that person" / "Let's do something fun" / "Eat the sadness and an ice cream bar".

== Release and promotion ==
Alongside Same Thing's announcement on October 4, 2019, the title track was released as a digital promotional single. It was also announced that the track would be added to international online radio via the program of New Zealand DJ Zane Lowe on Apple Music's Beats 1. Same Thing, the EP, was released via the Victor Entertainment label Speedstar Records on October 14, 2019, as a digital exclusive. From November to December, Hoshino gave debut performances of "Same Thing" and "Watashi" during a four-show world tour promoting Pop Virus.

A lyric video to "Sarashi-mono" was uploaded on the day of the EP's release, followed by a similar one for "Ain't Nobody Know" starring actor Yutaka Matsushige on November 13. Music videos were created for all songs; "Same Thing" was shot with Hoshino and Superorganism in Sydney, Australia, and was premiered on October 17, 2019; "Ain't Nobody Know" was released on January 16, 2020, and composes close-up shots of three couples, with the final scene showing Hoshino meeting actress/model Nana Komatsu in a coffee shop; released on February 20, "Watashi" features a simple style to match it as the only solo song on the EP, and was recorded entirely in plastic film; the animated video to "Sarashi-mono" was uploaded on March 18, directed by past collaborator Ryu Okubo using roughly two thousand illustrations of Hoshino and Punpee.

== Critical reception ==
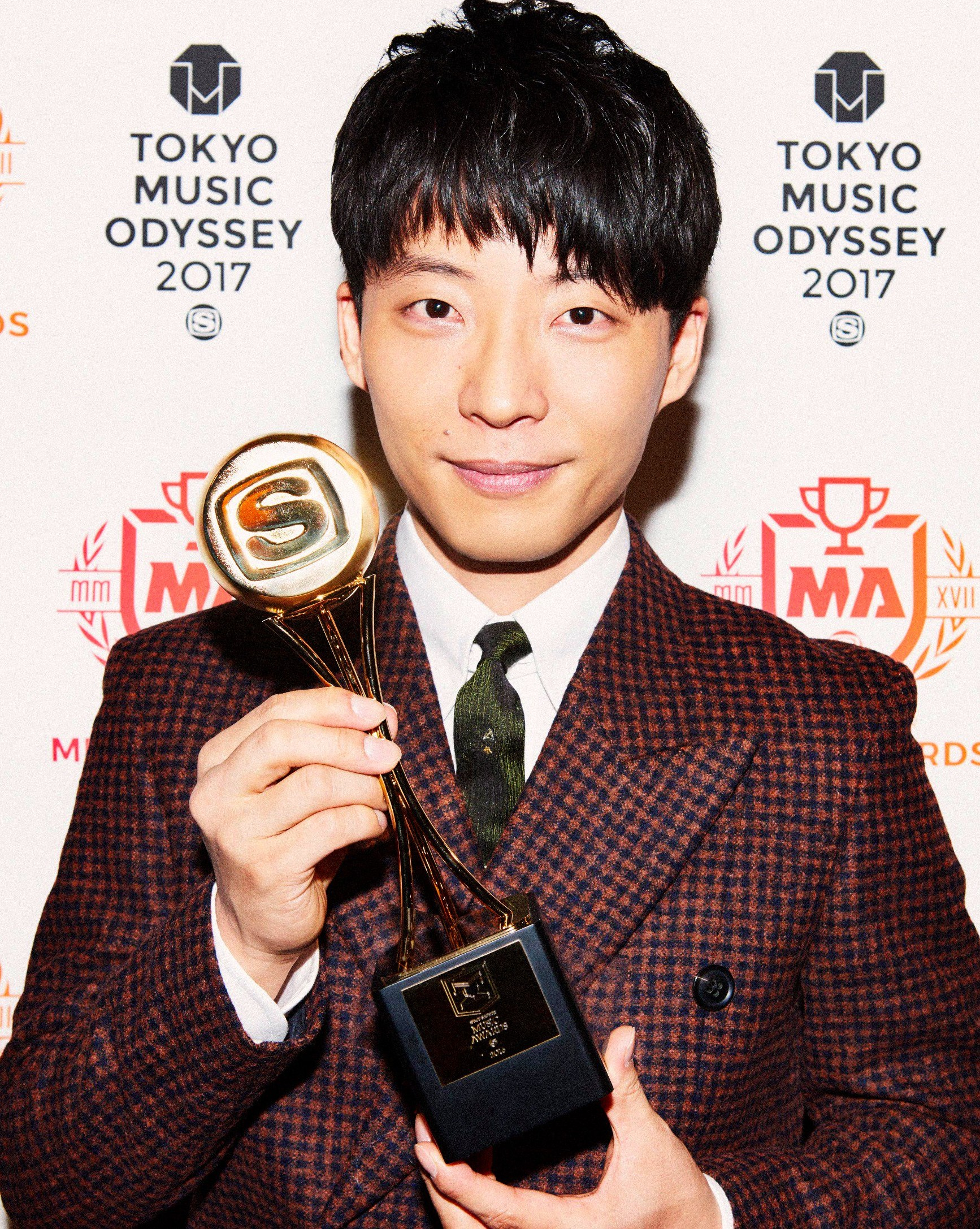
Several critics described Same Thing as a new step or style for Hoshino (pictured in 2017).

Same Thing was received positively by music critics in Japan, with many calling it a new style for Hoshino. By opening up to creating music with outsiders, Rockin'On's Koike felt that Hoshino is led to a new self by his collaborators without over-reliance, revealing a "Gen Hoshino we didn't know". Asuka Nakamura at Tower Records Japan's Mikiki wrote that the collaborations felt natural – not as if Hoshino was awkwardly writing with unrelated artists – and thought the EP showcases it was the result of a fun development process. Noting the title track, she thought that Superorganism helping Hoshino discover motivation for music turned the EP into an emotional work, praising their song as an impactful track that made her unconsciously smile. Music journalist Imdkm for Rolling Stone Japan wrote that Same Thing is filled with a freshness that feels as if Hoshino reset his knowledge from his past albums, "painting himself in the colors" of the collaborators. Conversely, Real Sound's Mori said that it establishes a new style for Hoshino, but thought that it was too early to call it a "complete mode change" and expected that his new vision would be made clearer with the following works. The title track with Superorganism was named Best Collaboration at the 2020 Space Shower Music Awards, where Hoshino also won Best Influential Artist of the Year.

By including the simplistic acoustic track "Watashi", Imdkm wrote that Hoshino turned the EP into a statement that indicates a restart of his career up until Pop Virus. Mori thought that the song exemplified Hoshino's current philosophy on the EP, and Rockin'On's Shinji Furukawa found it to be convey the "new Gen Hoshino" the most of all songs. Fujisawara wrote that it does not feel as if Hoshino is singing about himself, rather collaborating with an artist named "himself".

Critics complimented the musical and lyrical themes on the track listing. Nakamura wrote that the Western rap and pop reminiscent production made it one of the more likable works in Hoshino's discography, and believed it could earn an international audience since it was specifically not created with an international goal in mind. Koike called the composition excellent, noting the lively punk sound on "Same Thing", the soul chorus on "Sarashi-mono", and the guitar phrase partenered with Hoshino's falsetto on "Ain't Nobody Know". Ogawa, writing on the website of the Shibuya live house Liquidroom, called it a "disperse" collection of collaborations born from Hoshino's real-life relations, featuring a "rich sense of privacy" in its solitary sound, melodies, and lyrics.

== Commercial performance ==
Upon release, Same Thing debuted at first place on the weekly download albums charts of Billboard Japan and Oricon, both dated October 28, 2019. Billboard reported 32,099 paid downloads, beating Official Hige Dandism's second place Traveler (2019) by over 25,000 copies. Following Pop Virus, it became Hoshino's second consecutive album to top the download charts. On the Billboard Hot Albums chart, it peaked at number three, beaten by Mafumafu's Kagura-iro Artifact and Tohoshinki's XV, and made 17 total chart weeks. It performed similarly on the Oricon Combined Albums Chart, where it peaked at fourth place with a total of seven appearances. At the end of 2019, Billboard ranked Same Thing as the eight most-downloaded album of the year, with Pop Virus securing first place. It ranked at 48th on the same year's Hot Albums. On the year-end lists for 2020, Same Thing took 33rd for Download Albums did but did not reappear on the Hot Albums. As of June 2024, Oricon ranks Same Thing as Hoshino's third most-successful album by combined sales, behind Pop Virus and Yellow Dancer (2015).

With its release as a promotional single, the title track debuted at number 61 on the Billboard Japan Top Streamings Songs chart dated October 9, 2019. Upon the release of the EP, all songs appeared on the Streaming Songs chart: "Sarashi-mono" charted at number 14, "Same Thing" rose to 18, "Ain't Nobody Know" took 33, and "Watashi" made 63. The same week, all songs but "Watashi" also appeared on the Japan Hot 100: "Same Thing" at 12, "Sarashi-mono" at 20, and "Ain't Nobody Know" at 78. "Sarashi-mono" and "Same Thing" performed well enough to reach the Oricon Combined Singles Chart, peaking at numbers 26 and 27, respectively.

== Personnel ==
Credits adapted from Hoshino's website.

- Gen Hoshino – vocals, songwriter, producer (all tracks); background vocals (1–3); arrangement (2–4); acoustic guitar (4)
- Ryosuke Nagaoka – background vocals (2–3)
- Eiko Ishibashi – background vocals (2)
- Satoru Takeshima – tenor sax, horns arrangement (2)
- Superorganism – all instruments, background vocals, arrangement, English translation, producer, mixing, recording (1)
- Punpee – vocals, songwriter, arrangement, producer (2)
- Tobias Breuer (credited as Rascal) – all other instruments, composition, arrangement, producer (2)
- Tom Misch – all instruments, songwriter, arrangement, producer, recording (3)
- Kosuke Abe – recording (1–3)
- Shojiro Watanabe – mixing (2–4); recording (2, 4)

== Track listing ==
Digital download and streaming
No.	Title	Writer(s)	Producer(s)	Length
1.	"Same Thing" (featuring Superorganism)	Gen Hoshino; Superorganism	Hoshino; Superorganism	3:20
2.	"Sarashi-mono" (さらしもの, "Fool"; featuring Punpee)	Hoshino; Rascal; Punpee	Hoshino; Rascal; Punpee	3:50
3.	"Ain't Nobody Know" (featuring Tom Misch)	Hoshino; Misch	Hoshino; Misch	3:31
4.	"Watashi" (私, "I")	Hoshino	Hoshino	3:25
Total length:				14:06

== Charts ==
=== Weekly charts ===
Weekly chart performance for Same Thing (2019)
Chart (2019)	Peak position
Japanese Combined Albums (Oricon)	4
Japanese Hot Albums (Billboard Japan)	3

=== Year-end charts ===
Year-end chart performance for Same Thing (2019)
Chart (2019)	Position
Japanese Hot Albums (Billboard Japan)	48
Japanese Download Albums (Billboard Japan)	7

Year-end chart performance for Same Thing (2020)
Chart (2020)	Position
Japanese Download Albums (Billboard Japan)	33

== Release history ==
Release dates and formats for Same Thing
Region	Date	Format	Label	Catalogue code	Ref(s).
Various	October 14, 2019	Digital download; streaming	Speedstar Records	VEATP-36856	
South Korea	October 14, 2019	Digital download; streaming	J-Box Entertainment	—N/a	
