= Gag (song) =

2013 single by Gen Hoshino

Single by Gen Hoshino
- Language: Japanese
- B-side: "Dust"
- Released: May 8, 2013
- Genre: Rock; J-pop; anime song
- Length: 4:42
- Label: Speedstar
- Songwriters: Gen Hoshino, arr. Seiji Kameda

Gen Hoshino singles chronology
"Shiranai" (2012)	"Gag" (2013)	"Why Don't You Play in Hell?" (2013)

Music video
- "Gag" (Official Video) on YouTube

"Gag" (Japanese: ギャグ, Hepburn: Gyagu; lit. "Gag" as in visual gag) (Japanese pronunciation: [ɡʲaꜜgɯ]) is a song by Japanese singer-songwriter and musician Gen Hoshino. It was released by Speedstar Records on May 8, 2013, as Hoshino's fifth single. The song was arranged by Seiji Kameda, marking Hoshino's only single to not be self-arranged. A swingy rock and pop song with rock and roll composition, Hoshino wrote "Gag" for the 2013 film adaption of the comedy manga Saint Young Men (2006–), starring Hoshino as the Buddha.

The song was received positively by music critics upon release, who commented on the composition, the participating musicians, the B-side "Dust", and its cover art. For the cover, it was a runner-up for the Grand Prix at the 2014 Music Jacket Awards. "Gag" reached number four on the Oricon Singles Chart and number eight on Billboard Japan's Hot 100, ending as the 17th best-selling single of May 2013. The music video to the song, self-directed and edited by Hoshino using materials from Saint Young Men, was released to YouTube the same day as the single.

== Background and composition ==
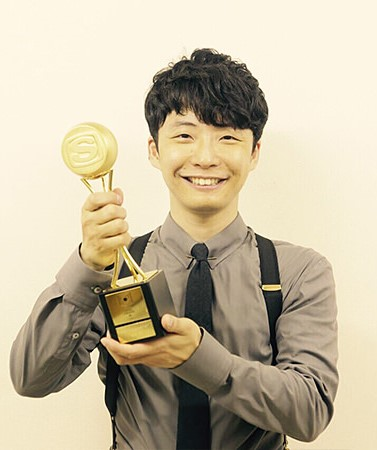
Hoshino (pictured in 2016) wrote "Gag" for the anime film Saint Young Men, starring himself as the Buddha.

During the production of his third album Stranger (2013), Gen Hoshino felt worried about several aspects and ended up aimlessly putting much of himself into the work. Upon the album's completion, Hoshino gained a great feeling of accomplishment and believed he had, for the moment, overcome uncertainty in his music. Advancing from the album, he wanted to ignore small details and focus on doing exciting and fun projects, which led the production process of "Gag" and its B-side "Dust".

"Gag" was written and performed by Hoshino as the main theme to the anime film adaptation of the comedy manga Saint Young Men, starring Hoshino in a lead role as the Buddha. Musically, it is a Japanese rock and pop song with light and swingy rock and roll composition as a musical take on the tempo of anime and manga, created by Hoshino through attempting to blend his own pop and alternative styles. In a press comment, he stated the song was born from reading one of his favorite manga series, and dedicated it to the manga artist Hikaru Nakamura and anime staff. At a later film release event, Hoshino said that he created the song with respect to the production team that backed him and co-star Mirai Moriyama, voice of Jesus Christ, during recording. Arrangement was handled by Seiji Kameda, marking Hoshino's only single to not self-arranged. Other musicians participating on the track include drummer Daichi Ito (co-member with Hoshino in the band Sakerock) and keyboardist Takuji Nomura. The song is the first work by Hoshino to feature guitarist Ryosuke Nagaoka, since a frequent collaborator.

== Release and promotion ==
The principal cast of Saint Young Men, including Hoshino, was announced in October 2012. Later on March 14, 2013, "Gag" was unveiled as the film's theme song. The song was announced for a single release on March 22, followed by usage in a trailer released to the Saint Young Men official website on April 4.

"Gag" was released by the Victor Entertainment label Speedstar Records on May 8, 2013, two days before the premiere of Saint Young Men and on the same day as the film score. With "Dust" as its B-side, "Gag" is Hoshino's fifth single overall, released only a week after Stranger, though it is not included in the album. The single's cover art was created by Daijirō Ōhara, previously the cover editor for the 2012 singles "Yume no Soto e" and "Shiranai", and features a sketched Hoshino above a yellow background, with his eyes and mouth swapped to spell "GAG". Though early editions of the single were bundled with a sticker by Saint Young Men artist Nakamura, "Gag" separates from Hoshino's usual release format of including a special DVD with limited editions.

A short music video for "Gag" was uploaded to Victor Entertainment's YouTube channel on the same day as the single's CD release. The video was directed and edited by Hoshino utilizing footage from the Saint Young Men film, including materials of its animation process. The video was included as an extra on the second disc of the video album Music Video Tour 2010–2017 (2017).

== Reception ==
"Gag" was received positively by music critics. A staff writer for CDJournal called "Gag" a "catchy" song that could easily get stuck in peoples' heads, and praised Kameda's "unique" arrangement and drummer Ito and keyboardist Nomura for providing the song with a pleasant atmosphere. Tower Records Japan's Oguri described it as a fun pop song, supported by Hoshino's sweet yet strong vocals. Hirokazu Koike of Rockin'On Japan felt that "Gag" shows Hoshino's respect for the Saint Young Men writers. He wrote that the track's "fun" swingy rock and roll musicality covered part of its honest theming, which he believed was commentary on the tempo of anime and manga. Emi Sugiura, also for Rockin'On, praised the guitar phrase of Nagaoka on the track as strangely distorted yet warming, which she thought provided for an effective hook to the tempo. Satoshi Takagi for Real Sound named the single's cover art as one that would increase customer interest, praising its illustration and humor for helping showcase the song's poppy funniness. Tied with Maximum the Hormone's album Yoshū Fukushū, the cover art was a runner-up for the Grand Prix at the Recording Industry Association of Japan (RIAJ)'s 2014 Music Jacket Awards, beaten by Miwa's Delight.

Critics also enjoyed the B-side "Dust". Oguri wrote that "Dust" is a "total change" from "Gag", as the B-side is the type of song "you would want to listen to alone in your room," and CDJournal staff called it a song to not discard. Koike praised the track as "amazing", writing that its scales remind of the Buddha and gives a feeling of Buddhist reincarnation / saṃsāra through a "soft touch" of blue funk.

Commercially, "Gag" opened on the Oricon Singles Chart dated May 20, 2013, with 19,198 sales, taking a peak position at number four. On the Billboard Japan Hot 100, the single opened May 15, at a peak of number eight. It debuted on Billboard's Adult Contemporary Airplay chart the same week at number 36, and rose to sixth place the next week. As an anime song, it peaked at number four on the Hot Animation chart. It finished at number 17 on Oricon's monthly singles ranking of May 2013, with 27,380 units sold. In total, "Gag" charted in Oricon's weekly top 100 for five weeks; with resurgences in 2016 through 2020, it has appeared in the top 200 for a total of 32 weeks. By April 2020, its most recent appearance on the chart, Oricon had registered 35,308 lifetime sales.

== Track listing ==
CD single and digital download

1. "Gag" (ギャグ, Gyagu) – 4:42
2. "Dust" (ダスト, Dasuto) – 3:47

Total length: 8:29

== Charts ==
Weekly chart performance for "Gag" (2013)
Chart (2013)	Peak position
Japan (Oricon)	4
Japan (Billboard Japan Hot 100)	8
Japanese Adult Contemporary (Billboard Japan)	6
Japan Hot Animation (Billboard Japan)	4

== Release history ==
Release dates and formats for "Gag"
Region	Date	Format	Label	Catalogue code	Ref(s).
Japan	May 8, 2013	CD; rental CD	Speedstar Records	VICL-36780	
Various	June 23, 2015	Digital download	Speedstar Records	—N/a	
Various	August 30, 2019	Streaming	Speedstar Records	—N/a	
South Korea	August 30, 2019	Streaming	J-Box Entertainment	—N/a	
