= Baka no Uta =

2010 studio album by Gen Hoshino

Studio album by Gen Hoshino
- Released: 16 June 2010
- Studio: Freedom (Shibuya); Thinksync Integral (Setagaya); Sound DALI (Setagaya)
- Genre: J-pop; rock
- Length: 47:58
- Language: Japanese
- Label: Kakubarhythm; Labels United; Speedstar
- Producer: Gen Hoshino

Gen Hoshino chronology
Baka no Uta (2010)	Episode (2011)

Baka no Uta (ばかのうた; lit. "Songs of an Idiot") (Japanese pronunciation: [baꜜka no ɯtaꜜ]) is the debut studio album by Japanese singer-songwriter and musician Gen Hoshino. Under Kakubarhythm, it was first issued as a limited LP record on 16 June 2010, before releasing as a CD album through Speedstar Records and Labels United on 23 June. Hoshino, then known as the leader, guitarist, and marimba player of the instrumental band Sakerock, began work on the album after being approached by Labels United's parent company Daisyworld to make a solo debut.

Covering topics of everyday life, Baka no Uta is a Japanese rock and pop album with a sound that was described as calm and lonely. The album compiles new tracks, two lyrical Sakerock covers, and re-recordings of songs Hoshino had released on a 2005 CD-R disc and 2007 CD-bundled photo booklet. Hoshino hosted live performances and autograph shows at Tower Records stores to promote the album, and embarked on a small tour visiting Tokyo and Osaka. Upon release, the album reached number 36 on the Oricon Albums Chart and number 38 on Billboard Japan's Top Albums Sales ranking. It was well received by Japanese critics, who praised its daily life theming. The album won a finalist award at the 2010 CD Shop Awards.

== Background ==
Though he grew up in a greengrocer home, Gen Hoshino's father played jazz piano as a hobby and his mother had previously aimed to be a jazz vocalist. He noted that the house was always "lined" with jazz records, and that music was constantly playing. While not a big fan of jazz, Hoshino would pick up his father's guitar in middle school as the instrument was popular among his classmates. In high school, his friends would ask him to compose music to lyrics they had written, which Hoshino found satisfying. He recorded himself singing the songs of high-pitched artists such as the band Unicorn but recalled feeling discouraged when listening to his recordings, believing the voice style did not fit him.

In 2000, Hoshino formed the band Sakerock with other students of the Jiyu no Mori Gakuen Junior and Senior High School, serving as the frontman, playing guitar and also marimba. Though Hoshino wanted to sing, he never expressed this and, as he had no friends who were singers either, the band became instrumental. The band independently released their debut album Yuta in 2003, before signing to indie label Kakubarhythm with their 2005 album Life Cycle. The band's appearances in media would rise with the release of Life Cycle, and they subsequently composed the soundtrack to the Isshin Inudo film Kiiroi Namida in 2007. In addition to his activities with Sakerock, Hoshino worked as an actor and, musically, began composing songs for stage plays and held acoustic live performances. In 2005, he released a self-produced CD-R album titled Baka no Uta, his first solo release. Partnering with photographer Taro Hirano, he released the CD and photo booklet Barabara in 2007, containing acoustic-performed songs.

Whilst finding performing with Sakerock rewarding and fun, Hoshino never thought of a solo debut, finding it scary. Around the time he was to turn 30, Hoshino felt he couldn't ignore his wish to sing and would need to act while still within his 20s. Coincidentally, Hoshino was around the same time approached by the label Daisyworld – owned by Yellow Magic Orchestra's Haruomi Hosono – asking if he was interesting in making a debut. Hoshino accepted, beginning production of his debut solo studio album Baka no Uta, the same title as his 2005 CD-R album.

== Music and production ==
Hoshino wrote and produced all tracks on Baka no Uta himself and performed on vocals, acoustic guitar, marimba, mandolin, banjo, glockenspiel, and toy piano. Sakerock drummer Daichi Ito, former band member, pianist, and organ player Takuji Nomura, and acoustic and electric bassist Suga Dairo provided instrumentation on the album, with Ren Takada featuring as a guest performer on pedal steel and resonator guitar. The album was recorded by Naoyuki Uchida at three locations in Tokyo: Freedom Studio, Thinksync Integral, and Sound DALI Studio. Mastering was handled by Mikazu Tanaka at Bernie Grundman Mastering. The track listing of Baka no Uta contains 15 songs, including the two instrumentals "Daisy Omisoshiru" (デイジーお味噌汁; lit. "Daisy Miso Soup") and "Sayōnara no Umi" (さようならのうみ; lit. "Sea of Departure"). Some tracks are taken from the 2005 CD-R of the same name and the 2007 CD booklet Barabara, and two are lyrical covers of Sakerock songs: "Ana o Horu" (穴を掘る; lit. "Dig a Hole") and "Rōfūfu" (老夫婦; lit. "Old Couple"), originally included on the albums Life Cycle and Honyarara, respectively. Hoshino described Baka no Uta as "only one-third old material", with everything else being new.

"Hirameki"
Real Sound's Takanori Kuroda felt that the fourteenth track "Hirameki", recorded by Hoshino in a low voice and composed with base in the Japanese yonanuki scale, had a homey atmosphere with similarities to nursery rhymes.

Baka no Uta covers themes of everyday life. Mayumi Tsuchida of Bounce magazine noted one song on the album as being about an old man who suddenly collapsed and died, and another as being about a child who was never born, whereas Mio at Tower Records Japan wrote that the album contains tracks focusing on everyday topics such as departure, scatter, teacup sets, and kids growing up. Musically, CDJournal categorizes the album as Japanese rock and pop and Tsuchida described it as performed in a "nostalgic-like band sound". Critics noted aging as a theme on the album, present in songs such as the second track "Goo" (グー, Gū), the fourth "Chawan" (茶碗; lit. "Teacup"), and the seventh "Rōfūfu". "Tadaima" (ただいま; lit. "I'm Home"), the album's thirteenth track, was composed by Haruomi Hosono. Hosono recorded a self-cover of the song for his album Hosonova (2011), on which Hoshino also co-wrote the lyrics for the song "Banana Oiwake".

The album's opening track "Barabara" (ばらばら; lit. "Scatter"), the title track to Hoshino's 2007 booklet, was also the first song recorded for the album. Written after Hoshino experienced heartbreak, the song proposes that people cannot become one or fully united, and that this fact is what allows people to connect. A new song for the album, the main promotional track "Kuse no Uta" (くせのうた; lit. "Habit Song") was described by Emi Sugiura of Rockin'On Japan as "invoking a sense of loneliness", giving the impression it was born from Hoshino "facing music alone at night". Real Sound's Natsuna Murakami interpreted the lyrics as discussing love in a roundabout manner and found the track representative of Hoshino's early music, prior to dance tracks such as "Sun" (2015) and "Koi" (2016). Hoshino recorded "Hirameki" (ひらめき; lit. "Flash") in a low voice to avoid waking up his landlord, who lived on the floor below him. A homey nursery rhyme, the song features musical elements that would become characteristic of Hoshino's music, according to music critic Takanori Kuroda for Real Sound. Composed with E-flat and based in the Japanese yonanuki scale, in which F and C notes are excluded, the song is built on diatonic chords, with an expectation of Am_{7}-5 as the transitional.

== Promotion and release ==
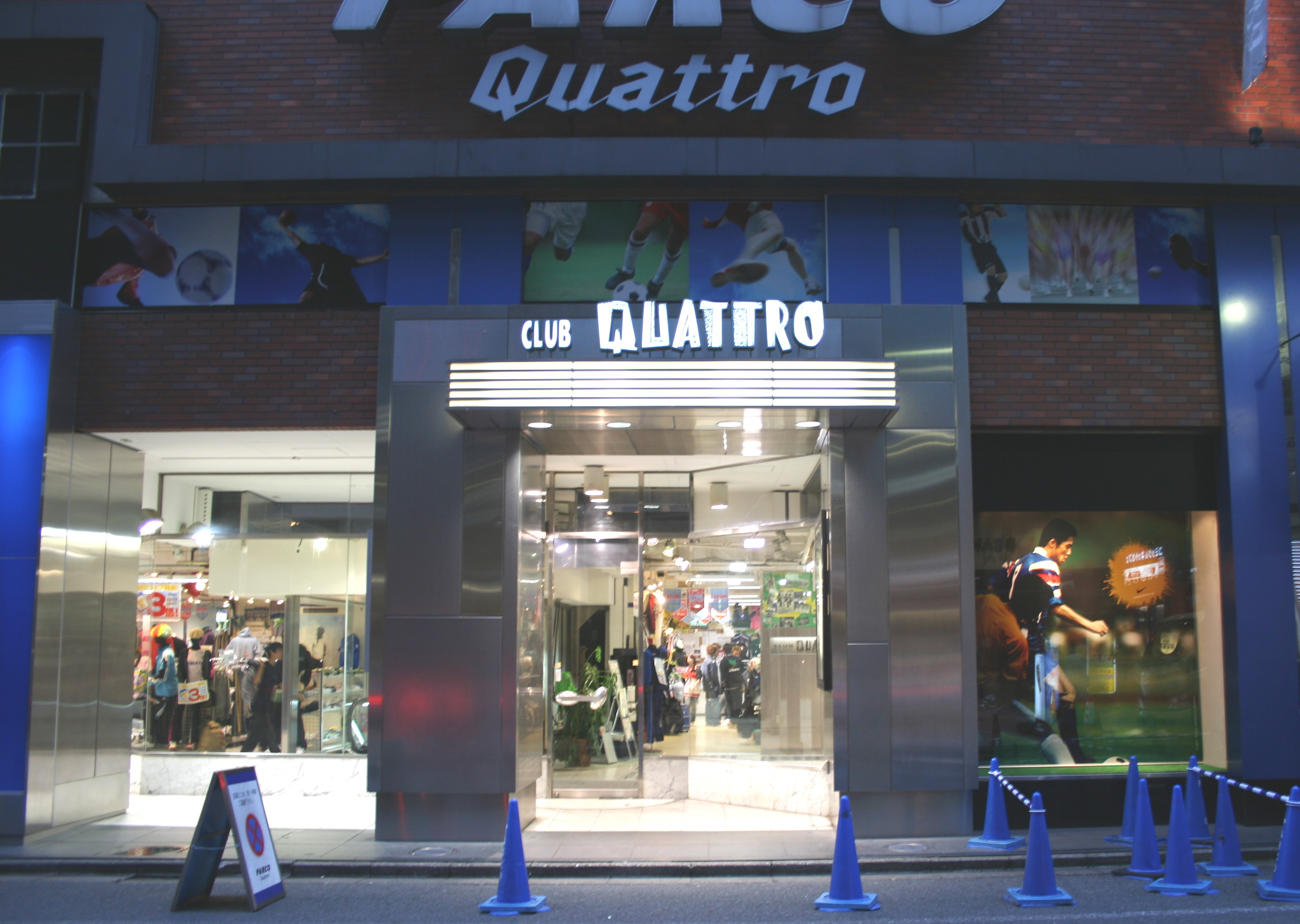
To promote Baka no Uta, Hoshino performed at Club Quattro venues in Shibuya, Tokyo, and Shinsaibashi, Osaka (Shibuya location pictured).

On 26 March 2010, it was announced that Hoshino was in the process of recording an untitled lyrical debut solo album, with a band consisting of Daichi Ito on drums, Takuji Nomura on keyboard, and Suga Dairo on bass. In late April, he was set to unveil select songs from the album as a guest performer on the Tokyo and Osaka shows of the concert Springfields '10. A month after the announcement, details and the full track listing was unveiled alongside the album's title, Baka no Uta. A documentary to the album's production was uploaded to YouTube in May, directed by "Ichiro Yamada"–the name of an art unit consisting of Hoshino, director Santa Yamagishi, and designer Daijirō Ōhara. A music video for the song "Kuse no Uta", also directed by the unit, was released on 11 June. The song was used as the album's sole promotional single, released as a ringtone the same day as the music video and for digital download on 14 July. Baka no Uta was first issued as a limited edition LP record on 16 June 2010 via Kakubarhythm, a week ahead of the proper release. The CD album was released on 23 June 2010, jointly issued by Victor Entertainment's Speedstar Records and Daisyworld's Labels United.

To promote the release, Hoshino announced that he would perform and host autograph shows at Tower Records stores in Tokyo, Osaka, Miyagi, and Hokkaido throughout July, distributing tickets via copies of the album bought from Tower Records. From 12 July to 13, Hoshino toured for Baka no Uta with two shows at the Club Quattro venues in Shibuya, Tokyo, and Shinsaibashi, Osaka. The tour featured Ito on drums, Nomura on keyboard, and Dairo on bass, with Takada also guest starring on the performances of "Rōfūfu", "Ana o Horu", "Kyōdai" (兄弟; lit. "Siblings"), and "Tadaima". In July 2020, Hoshino celebrated the tenth anniversary of Baka no Uta's release by revisiting the Shibuya Club Quattro venue to perform the online concert Gen Hoshino's 10th Anniversary Concert: Gratitude, featuring "Rōfūfu" as the only Baka no Uta song on the setlist.

== Commercial performance ==
Around its week of release, Baka no Uta sold 3,831 CD copies in Japan, reaching number 38 on the Billboard Japan Top Albums Sales Chart and number 36 on the Oricon Albums Chart. It continued to rank in the top 300 of Oricon's chart until October 2013, before leaving the ranking after 25 weeks. Tracking the regional sales at Tower Records stores, CDJournal reported that the album primarily sold at the Shibuya, Shinjuku, and Sapporo locations, with less significant sales to no chart history at the stores in Osaka, Fukuoka, and Nagoya. In October 2010, a writer for the site described Baka no Uta as a long-seller–a work that continues to sell for a long period of time.

The album has resurfaced on the Oricon and Billboard Japan charts from 2015 and forward. From 2015 to 2017, it charted an additional 25 weeks on the Oricon Albums Chart for a total of 50 appearances. By August 2017, its most recent appearance, Oricon reported that the album had reached 26,413 accumulative sales. In December 2016, the album reached number four on the Taiwanese J-pop albums chart, published by G-Music. The same month, Baka no Uta debuted on the Billboard Japan Hot Albums, where it would chart for 11 weeks and reach a peak at number 40. In March 2019, it debuted at number 97 on Billboard's Top Download Albums chart.

== Critical reception ==
Baka no Uta was received positively by Japanese music critics, who praised its connection to everyday life. The album received a finalist award at the third annual CD Shop Awards, voted by music stores around Japan. Maki Osako, a staffer for the Tower Records store in Kagoshima, commented on the award page: "[...] it is a record that has become a part of our daily life. Like how every day we eat dinner, use the bathroom, and take off our shoes, we listen to this [album]. When I find someone special, or when my heart breaks, or even if I begin to approach death, I will want to listen to Baka no Uta. Baka no Uta will fit with any listener. Because there is no listener who does not live." It was beaten for the Grand Prix by the rock band Andymori's Fanfare to Nekkyō (2010).

A writer for CDJournal called Baka no Uta sensible and praised its melodies as unique. Site staff member Nozomi ranked Baka no Uta as her third-favorite album of the early half of 2010, finding that it "quietly conveyed the deep genius of Gen Hoshino". She later ranked the album as her favorite of 2010, writing that it had "perfectly fitted [her] life rhythm," having listened to the album on her way to work, at work, on the way home, and at home. Bounce's Mayumi Tsuchida wondered why Hoshino would choose to write songs about the topics featured on the album, but found that every song on the album would still resonate with "strange and warm emotions". She summarized it as a high-quality singer-songwriter album, carefully created by "the right people in the right places". Ayumi Nakayama, a writer for the magazine Intoxicate, felt that Hoshino's songwriting merged feelings of relief and some loneliness, creating a "soft" track listing that she thanked Hoshino for. Shinji Hyogo, the editor-in-chief at Rockin'On Japan, wrote that, despite featuring calm vocals, instrumentation, and melodies, Baka no Uta has a "fantastic" feel of solitude.

== Personnel ==
Credits adapted from the CD album liner notes and Daisyworld.

- Gen Hoshino – songwriter, producer, vocals, acoustic guitar, marimba, mandolin, banjo, glockenspiel, toy piano, handclapping; all instruments (#5, #11)
- Haruomi Hosono – composer (#13)
- Gen Hoshino to Minna (星野源とみんな; "Gen Hoshino and Everyone") – arrangement
- Daichi Ito – drums, handclapping
- Suga Dairo – acoustic bass, electric bass, handclapping
- Takuji Nomura – piano, organ, handclapping
- Ren Takada – pedal steel guitar, resonator guitar
- Santa Yamagishi – handclapping
- Azusa Akahori – handclapping
- Eiichi Higashi – handclapping, record manufacturing director
- Naoyuki Uchida – recording
- Mikazu Tanaka – mastering

== Track listing ==
All tracks are written by Gen Hoshino, except where otherwise noted.

CD album
No.	Title	Japanese title	Length
1.	"Barabara"	ばらばら ("Scatter")	3:22
2.	"Goo"	グー (Gū)	3:34
3.	"Kitchen"	キッチン (Kicchin)	4:16
4.	"Chawan"	茶碗 ("Teacup")	3:53
5.	"Daisy Omisoshiru" (Instrumental)	デイジーお味噌汁 ("Daisy Miso Soup")	1:31
6.	"Yonaka Uta"	夜中唄 ("Night Song")	3:51
7.	"Rōfūfu"	老夫婦 ("Old Couple")	2:01
8.	"Kuse no Uta"	くせのうた ("Habit Song")	4:44
9.	"Kyōdai"	兄妹 ("Siblings")	2:49
10.	"Kodomo"	子供 ("Kid")	3:32
11.	"Sayōnara no Umi" (Instrumental)	さようならのうみ ("Sea of Farewell")	2:21
12.	"Ana o Horu"	穴を掘る ("Dig a Hole")	2:48
13.	"Tadaima" (co-written with Haruomi Hosono)	ただいま ("I'm Home")	3:25
14.	"Hirameki"	ひらめき ("Flash")	2:42
15.	"Baka no Uta"	ばかのうた ("Stupid Song")	3:25
Total length:			47:58

LP album – side A
No.	Title	Japanese title	Length
1.	"Barabara"	ばらばら ("Scatter")	3:22
2.	"Goo"	グー (Gū)	3:34
3.	"Kitchen"	キッチン (Kicchin)	4:16
4.	"Chawan"	茶碗 ("Teacup")	3:53
5.	"Daisy Omisoshiru" (Instrumental)	デイジーお味噌汁 ("Daisy Miso Soup")	1:31
6.	"Yonaka Uta"	夜中唄 ("Night Song")	3:51
7.	"Rōfūfu"	老夫婦 ("Old Couple")	2:01
8.	"Kuse no Uta"	くせのうた ("Habit Song")	4:44

LP album – side B
No.	Title	Japanese title	Length
9.	"Kyōdai"	兄妹 ("Siblings")	2:49
10.	"Kodomo"	子供 ("Kid")	3:32
11.	"Sayōnara no Umi" (Instrumental)	さようならのうみ ("Sea of Farewell")	2:21
12.	"Ana o Horu"	穴を掘る ("Dig a Hole")	2:48
13.	"Tadaima" (co-written with Hosono)	ただいま ("I'm Home")	3:25
14.	"Hirameki"	ひらめき ("Flash")	2:42
15.	"Baka no Uta"	ばかのうた ("Stupid Song")	3:25
Total length:			47:58

== Charts ==
Weekly chart performance for Baka no Uta (2010–13)
Chart (2010–13)	Peak position
Japanese Albums (Oricon)	36
Japanese Top Albums Sales (Billboard Japan)	38

Weekly chart performance for Baka no Uta (2015–17)
Chart (2015–17)	Peak position
Japanese Albums (Oricon)	62
Japanese Hot Albums (Billboard Japan)	40
Taiwanese J-Pop Albums (G-Music)	4

Weekly chart performance for Baka no Uta (2019)
Chart (2019)	Peak position
Japanese Top Download Albums (Billboard Japan)	97

== Release history ==
Release history for Baka no Uta
Region	Date	Format	Label	Catalogue code	Ref.
Japan	16 June 2010	LP record	Kakubarhythm	KAKU-042	
Japan	23 June 2010	CD	Labels United; Speedstar Records	VICL-63626	
Japan	12 July 2010	rental CD	Victor Entertainment	VICL-63626R	
South Korea	31 May 2011	Digital download	J-Box Entertainment	—	
Taiwan	3 June 2011	CD	Rock Records	GUT2349	
Japan	5 February 2014	Vinyl (reprint)	Speedstar Records	VIJL-60130	
Various	23 June 2015	Digital download	Speedstar Records	—	
Various	30 August 2019	Streaming	Speedstar Records	—	
