= Stranger (Gen Hoshino album) =

Studio album by Gen Hoshino
- Released: 1 May 2013
- Genre: J-pop; rock
- Length: 50:20
- Language: Japanese
- Label: Speedstar
- Producer: Gen Hoshino

Gen Hoshino chronology
Episode (2011)	Stranger (2013)	Yellow Dancer (2015)

Singles from Stranger
- 1. "Film" Released: 8 February 2012; 2. "Yume no Soto e" Released: 4 July 2012; 3. "Shiranai" Released: 28 November 2012

Stranger (Japanese pronunciation: [sɯ̥toɾeꜜndʑaː]) is the third studio album by Japanese singer-songwriter and musician Gen Hoshino. It was released on 1 May 2013 in Japan on Speedstar Records.

It was the first release since Hoshino's hiatus after he suffered subarachnoid hemorrhage at the end of 2012. As of May 2013, it is ranked 2nd on the Oricon music charts. All three singles promoting the album reached the top 10 — "Film" placed at #4, "Yume no Soto e" at #8 and "Shiranai" at #5.

== Track listing ==
All tracks are written by Gen Hoshino.

No.	Title	Length
1.	"Bakemono" (化物, "Monster")	2:27
2.	"Work Song" (ワークソング, Wāku Songu)	3:24
3.	"Yume no Soto e" (夢の外へ, "Out of the Dream")	3:51
4.	"Film" (フィルム, Firumu)	4:49
5.	"Tour" (ツアー, Tsuā)	3:31
6.	"Skirt" (スカート, Sukāto)	3:27
7.	"Umare Kawari" (生まれ変わり, "Rebirth")	3:54
8.	"Parody" (パロディ, Parodi)	4:21
9.	"Kisetsu" (季節, "Season")	3:59
10.	"Record Noise" (レコードノイズ, Rekōdo Noizu)	4:59
11.	"Shiranai" (知らない, "I Don't Know")	4:54
12.	"Aru Shashō" (ある車掌, "A Train Conductor")	4:20
13.	"Stranger" (hidden track)	2:22
Total length:		50:20

== Charts ==
=== Weekly charts ===
Weekly chart performance for Stranger (2013)
Chart (2013)	Peak position
Japanese Albums (Oricon)	2
Japanese Top Albums Sales (Billboard Japan)	2

Weekly chart performance for Stranger (2015–18)
Chart (2017)	Peak position
Japanese Albums (Oricon)	33
Japanese Hot Albums (Billboard Japan)	22
Taiwanese J-Pop Albums (G-Music)	5

=== Year-end charts ===
Year-end chart performance for Stranger (2013)
Chart (2013)	Position
Japanese Albums (Oricon)	87
Japanese Top Albums Sales (Billboard Japan)	76

Year-end chart performance for Stranger (2017)
Chart (2017)	Position
Japanese Hot Albums (Billboard Japan)	100

== Certifications ==
Certifications for Stranger
Region	Certification	Certified units/sales
Japan (RIAJ)	Gold	110,677

== Release history ==
Release dates and formats for Stranger
Region	Date	Format	Label	Catalogue code	Ref.
Japan	1 May 2013	CD	Speedstar Records	VICL-63996	
Japan	18 May 2013	rental CD	Speedstar Records	VICL-63996R	
Taiwan	31 May 2013	CD	Rock Records	GUT2422	
Japan	5 February 2014	Vinyl	Speedstar Records	VIJL-60132	
Various	June 23, 2015	Digital download	Speedstar Records	—N/a	
Various	August 30, 2019	Streaming	Speedstar Records	—N/a	
South Korea	August 30, 2019	Streaming	J-Box Entertainment	—N/a	
