= Rockin'On Japan =

Japanese magazine

- February 2016 cover showing the band Man With A Mission
- Editor: Daisuke Koyanagi
- Categories: Music and Culture
- Frequency: Monthly
- Founder: Yoichi Shibuya
- Founded: 1972
- Company: Rockin'On Inc.
- Country: Japan
- Language: Japanese
- Website: rockinon.com

Rockin'On Japan, often stylized in all caps, is a monthly magazine that covers the Japanese music scene and various cultural events in Japan, such as art venues and culinary expos.

== History ==
The magazine was founded in 1972, and focused on providing news that was thoroughly sourced and fact-checked, while also providing content without censorship and on original news stories. This requirement involved only conducting one on one interviews without doing generalized press interviews and announcements. The magazine later, in 1986, split into versions that served Japan domestically, re-titled to Rockin'On Japan, and that covered international music content, titled Rockin'On. The current owner of the magazine is Yoichi Shibuya, who oversaw the expansions of the magazine and the creation of official music festivals sponsored by the magazine itself.

== Festivals and production ==
The main festival created by the magazine is named Rock in Japan Festival and sets itself apart by having strict regulations banning moshing and stage-diving so that the festival is more open to the public and general music crowd. The other large festival created and sponsored by the magazine is named Countdown Japan and the two festivals make up the promotion arm of the magazine's focus on Japanese music. Music production is also sponsored by the magazine due to their creation of a music studio named Jackman Records. The style of music produced and sponsored by the magazine has been commonly referred to as Rockin’On-kei and represents a "faintly progressive, watered-down alternative rock arrangements with soaring J-pop vocal melodies, delivered with impressive technical virtuosity".
