= Speedstar Records =

- Parent company: Victor Entertainment
- Founded: October 1992
- Founder: Takeshi Takagaki
- Genre: Rock
- Country of origin: Japan
- Official website: www.jvcmusic.co.jp/speedstar/

Speedstar Records is a Japanese record label and subsidiary of Victor Entertainment. It was founded in October 1992 by Takeshi Takagaki, who had discovered the rock band Southern All Stars for Victor Entertainment. Akira Ono became head of the label in 2010. Although a separate label, Taishita Label (タイシタレーベル, Taishita Rēberu), which is exclusively for Southern All Stars and its members' other work, operates under the Speedstar umbrella.

== Artists ==
Selected list of Speedstar artists. Adapted from Uta-Net

- Ajico
- Ame no Parade
- Ichiko Aoba
- The Back Horn
- Gen Hoshino
- Haruomi Hosono
- Jungle Smile
- Kick the Can Crew
- Kreva
- Love Psychedelico
- Mugi the Cat
- Masatoshi Nagase
- Never Young Beach
- Maki Nomiya
- Kiyofumi Ohno
- Quruli
- Kazuyoshi Saito
- Sheena & the Rokkets
- Shikao Suga
- Keiichi Tomita
- Ayano Tsuji
- Ua
- Wino
- Akiko Yano

== Concerts and events ==
- Live Speedstar Express: 15-sai no Hatsu-taiken Hatsu-taiken — Shibuya-AX — November 8, 2007
- Speedstar Records 20th Anniversary Live — Zepp DiverCity — January 18–20, 2013
- Live the Speedstar — Makuhari Messe — March 18, 2023

== Discography ==
List of Speedstar Records compilation albums
Title	Released
Hammer Songs: Speedstar Records 15th Anniv. Compilation	November 8, 2007
Tag Songs: Speedstar Records 15th Anniv. Compilation 2	December 19, 2007
