= Gen Hoshino discography =

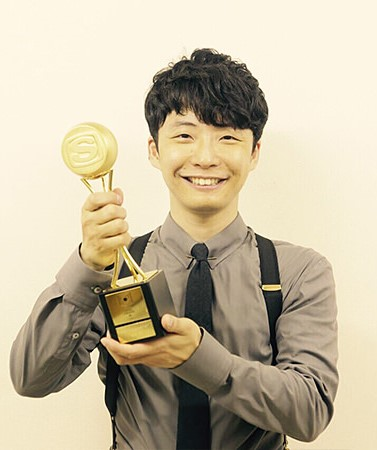
- Hoshino at the Space Shower Music Awards in 2016
- Studio albums: 6
- EPs: 2
- Live albums: 9
- Compilation albums: 4
- Singles: 26
- Promotional singles: 12
- Music videos: 42

The discography of Japanese singer-songwriter, musician, and actor Gen Hoshino consists of 6 original studio albums, 2 extended plays (EPs), 9 live albums, 4 compilations, 26 singles, 12 promotional singles, and 42 music videos (including works as featured artist). After only releasing music physically, his full discography was released for digital download on June 23, 2015, and for streaming on August 30, 2019.

Hoshino debuted as the frontman of the instrumental band Sakerock (2000–2015), where he played guitar and marimba. He self-released a CD-R entitled Baka no Uta in 2005, and in 2007 released a CD entitled Barabara as a bundle to a booklet by photographer Taro Hirano. After he was approached by former Yellow Magic Orchestra member Haruomi Hosono and his label Daisyworld, Hoshino re-used the title of the 2005 CD-R for his debut studio album Baka no Uta in June 2010. A joint issue by Daisyworld's Labels United, Victor Entertainment's Speedstar Records, and the Sakerock-signed Kakubarhythm, (Note: Kakubarhythm released the LP version of Baka no Uta on June 16, 2010, preceding the CD release by Labels United and Speedstar Records on June 23.) the album charted at number 36 on the Oricon's Albums Chart. Hoshino debuted on the Billboard Japan Hot 100 with the single "Kudaranai no Naka ni" (2011) at number 12, and released his second album Episode solely through Speedstar on September 28, 2011, to a peak at number five on Oricon.

Three singles were released by Hoshino throughout 2012—"Film", "Yume no Soto e", and "Shiranai"—which charted on the Hot 100 at fifth, fourth, and third, respectively. They supported his third studio album Stranger (released on May 1, 2013), which had been delayed by Hoshino falling ill to a subarachnoid hemorrhage in December 2012. The 76th best-selling Japanese album of the year, it peaked at number two on the album charts, and was certified gold by the Recording Industry Association of Japan (RIAJ) in 2017. Hoshino went into a second hiatus in June 2013 after a reinspection revealed a relapse in the hemorrhage. The single "Why Don't You Play in Hell?" (2013; for the film of the same name) was released during his hiatus, and the double A-sided "Crazy Crazy" / "Sakura no Mori" (2014) marked his first release after a return to activities. In 2015, Hoshino received his first song certification with "Sun", the theme to the television drama series Kokoro ga Pokitto ne (2015), which attained a triple-platinum certification for digital sales, a platinum certification for streaming, and a gold certification for physical sales. It was followed by Hoshino's fourth album Yellow Dancer on December 2, 2015, which was his first number one on the Billboard Japan Hot Albums chart and also the East Asian music chart in Taiwan. The album received platinum and gold certifications from the RIAJ in the physical sales and download categories, respectively, and placed sixth on Billboard Japan's year-end ranking for 2016.

In 2017, Hoshino topped the year-end Hot 100 with his 2016 single "Koi", the ending theme to the popular television drama The Full-Time Wife Escapist (2016), which also stars Hoshino in a lead role. "Koi" spent seven consecutive weeks atop the Japan Hot 100 and 11 weeks at number one in total; one of the most successful songs on the Hot 100, it achieved number five on the March 2023 all-time chart. The RIAJ has certified "Koi" two-times million in digital sales and also gave it two different platinum awards for physical sales and streaming. Following "Koi", Hoshino achieved four consecutive number ones with "Family Song" (2017), "Doraemon" (2018), and "Idea" (2018), which were all certified platinum. "Idea"—a digital-exclusive—became the first song on the Japan Hot 100 to hold first place for consecutive weeks without physical sale points. "Koi", "Family Song", and "Idea" were featured on Hoshino's fifth studio album, Pop Virus, on December 19, 2018. With four weeks atop the Japan Hot Albums chart, it was certified double-platinum and placed second on the 2019 year-end chart. Oricon ranks it as Hoshino's best-selling album.

Though the aftermath of Pop Virus left Hoshino burnt out, his befriending of the London-based indie band Superorganism, Japanese rapper Punpee, and English musician Tom Misch resulted in the production of the four-track EP Same Thing (2019), which peaked at number four on the Oricon Combined Albums Chart. In 2021, Hoshino released the singles "Create" and "Fushigi", which charted at numbers 94 and 71 on the Billboard Global Excl. US chart, his first international chart entries. "Comedy" (2022), the ending theme to the anime series Spy × Family (2022–), entered the Global 200 at 127 and also charted in Taiwan at 21. In 2023, Hoshino released his second EP, Lighthouse, comprised by theme music for the Netflix talk show of the same name that he co-hosted with comedian Masayasu Wakabayashi. It charted at number six on the Billboard Japan Hot Albums and at 18 on Oricon's Combined Albums. Hoshino's sixth studio album, eponymously titled Gen, was released on May 14, 2025. It is his first album in over six years.

== Indie releases ==
List of indie releases, with details
| Title | Release details |
|---|---|
| Baka no Uta (ばかのうた; lit. 'Songs of an Idiot') | Released: 2005; Label: Self-released; Formats: CD-R |
| Barabara (ばらばら; lit. 'Scatter') | Released: April 27, 2007 (bundle to photo booklet by Taro Hirano); Label: Littlemore (book publisher); Formats: CD |

== Albums ==
=== Studio albums ===
List of studio albums, with selected chart positions, sales figures, and certifications
| Title | Album details | Peak chart positions | | | | Sales (Note: Pure sales figures; no equivalent units) | Certifications |
| Title | Album details | JPN | JPN Comb. (Note: The Oricon Combined Albums Chart was established in December 2018.) | JPN Hot (Note: The Billboard Japan Hot Albums was established in June 2015.) | TWN EA | Sales | Certifications |
|---|---|---|---|---|---|---|---|
| Baka no Uta (ばかのうた; lit. 'Songs of an Idiot') | Released: June 16, 2010; Label: Kakubarhythm, Labels United, Speedstar; Formats: LP, CD, digital download, streaming | 36 | — | 40 (Note: Baka no Uta was released five years prior to the establishment of the Billboard Japan Hot Albums, although it still peaked at number 40 on the chart in December 2016. Upon release, it peaked at number 38 on the Billboard Japan Top Albums Sales chart, which was the primary album chart at the time.) | 4 | JPN: 26,413 (Note: Japanese physical album sales for Baka no Uta as of August 2017, compiled by Oricon from the album's chart history) | |
| Episode (エピソード, Episōdo) | Released: September 28, 2011; Label: Speedstar; Formats: CD, LP, digital download, streaming | 5 | — | 41 (Note: Episode was released four years prior to the establishment of the Billboard Japan Hot Albums, although it still peaked at number 41 on the chart in December 2016. Upon release, it reached number six on the Billboard Japan Top Albums Sales chart, which was the primary album chart at the time.) | 11 | JPN: 50,783 (Note: Japanese physical album sales for Episode as of August 2017, compiled by Oricon from the album's chart history) | |
| Stranger | Released: May 1, 2013; Label: Speedstar; Formats: CD, LP, digital download, streaming | 2 | — | 22 (Note: Stranger was released two years prior to the establishment of the Billboard Japan Hot Albums, although it still peaked at number 22 on the chart in January 2017. Upon release, it peaked at number two on the Billboard Japan Top Albums Sales chart, which was the primary album chart at the time.) | 5 | JPN: 110,677 (Note: Japanese physical album sales for Stranger as of March 2018, compiled by Oricon from the album's chart history) | RIAJ (physical): Gold |
| Yellow Dancer | Released: December 2, 2015; Label: Speedstar; Formats: CD, LP, digital download, streaming | 1 | 9 | 1 | 1 | JPN: 441,994 (Note: Japanese total album sales for Yellow Dancer: 341,994 physical sales (compiled by Oricon from the album's chart history, as of January 2019) + 100,000 digital downloads (from February 2018 RIAJ certification)) | RIAJ (physical): Platinum; RIAJ (download): Gold |
| Pop Virus | Released: December 19, 2018; Label: Speedstar; Formats: CD, LP, digital download, streaming | 1 | 1 | 1 | 1 | JPN: 558,764 (Note: Japanese total album sales for Pop Virus: 500,000 physical sales (adapted from December 2018 RIAJ certification) + 58,764 digital downloads (from February 2019 report by Musicman)) | RIAJ (physical): 2× Platinum |
| Gen | Released: May 14, 2025; Label: Speedstar; Formats: CD, LP, digital download, streaming | 2 | 2 | 2 | — | JPN: 128,880 (Note: Japanese physical album sales for Gen as of November 2025, compiled by Oricon from the album's chart history) | RIAJ (physical): Gold |
"—" denotes a recording that did not chart or was not eligible to chart.

=== Extended plays ===
List of extended plays (EPs), with selected chart positions and sales figures
| Title | EP details | Peak chart positions | | Sales |
| Title | EP details | JPN Comb. | JPN Hot | Sales |
|---|---|---|---|---|
| Same Thing | Released: October 14, 2019; Label: Speedstar; Formats: digital download, streaming | 4 | 3 | JPN: 32,099 (Note: Japanese first-week digital sales for Same Thing, per Billboard Japan) |
| Lighthouse | Released: September 8, 2023; Label: Speedstar, Netflix Music; Formats: digital download, streaming | 13 | 6 | JPN: 5,474 (Note: Japanese first-week digital sales for Lighthouse, per Billboard Japan) |

=== Live albums ===
List of live albums, with selected chart positions, sales figures, and certifications
| Title | Album details | Peak chart positions | | Sales | Certifications |
| Title | Album details | JPN BD | JPN DVD | Sales | Certifications |
|---|---|---|---|---|---|
| Stranger in Budokan | Released: August 20, 2014; Venue: Nippon Budokan; Label: Speedstar; Formats: Blu-ray, DVD | 5 | 3 | | |
| Two Beat in Yokohama Arena (ツービート IN 横浜アリーナ, Tsūbīto in Yokohama Arīna) | Released: March 25, 2015; Venue: Yokohama Arena; Label: Speedstar; Formats: Blu-ray, DVD | 13 | 12 | | |
| Live Tour: Yellow Voyage | Released: June 22, 2016; Venue: Osaka-jō Hall; Label: Speedstar; Formats: Blu-ray, DVD | 1 | 1 | JPN: 100,000 (Note: Japanese combined Blu-ray and DVD sales for Live Tour: Yellow Voyage, adapted from RIAJ certification) | RIAJ: Gold |
| Yellow Disc: Hoshino Gen Shika Denai Natsu Fes in Itsumo no Radio Booth (星野源しか出ない夏フェス in いつものラジオブース, Hoshino Gen Shika Denai Natsu Fesu in Itsumo no Rajio Būsu; lit. 'Summer Festival with Only Gen Hoshino in the Usual Radio Booth') | Released: January 23, 2017 (bundle with the first issue of Hoshino's Yellow Magazine); Venue: All Night Nippon radio booth; Label: Speedstar; Formats: CD | — | — | | |
| Live Tour: Continues | Released: January 10, 2018; Venue: Saitama Super Arena; Label: Speedstar; Formats: Blu-ray, DVD | 1 | 1 | JPN: 118,291 (Note: Japanese combined Blu-ray and DVD sales for Live Tour: Continues as of December 2018: 59,411 Blu-rays + 58,880 DVDs (compiled from Oricon's year-end charts)) | RIAJ: Gold |
| Yellow Disc: Hoshino Gen Live Tour 2017 'Continues' in Radio Booth (星野源Live Tour 2017『Continues』in ラジオブース, Hoshino Gen Live Tour 2017 "Continues" in Rajio Būsu) | Released: March 19, 2018 (bundle with the second issue of Hoshino's Yellow Magazine); Venue: All Night Nippon radio booth; Label: Speedstar; Formats: CD | — | — | | |
| Yellow Disc: Hoshino Gen Hikigatari Live in Itsumo no Radio Booth! (星野源 弾き語りライブ in いつものラジオブース!, Hoshino Gen Hikigatari Raibu in Itsumo no Rajio Būsu!; lit. 'Gen Hoshino Acoustic Show in the Usual Radio Booth!') | Released: March 2019 (bundle with the third issue of Hoshino's Yellow Magazine); Venue: All Night Nippon radio booth; Label: Speedstar; Formats: CD | — | — | | |
| Dome Tour: Pop Virus at Tokyo Dome | Released: August 7, 2019; Venue: Tokyo Dome; Label: Speedstar; Formats: Blu-ray, DVD | 1 | 1 | JPN: 100,000 (Note: Japanese combined Blu-ray and DVD sales for Dome Tour: Pop Virus at Tokyo Dome as of August 2018, adapted from RIAJ certification) | RIAJ: Gold |
| Gen Hoshino Presents Mad Hope Japan Tour | Released: April 22, 2026; Venue: Osaka-jō Hall; Label: Speedstar; Formats: Blu-ray, DVD | 1 | 3 | JPN: 27,000 (Note: First-week combined sales for Gen Hoshino Presents Mad Hope Japan Tour, according to Oricon: 7,000 DVDs + 20,000 Blu-rays) | |
"—" denotes a recording that did not chart or was not eligible to chart.

=== Compilations ===
==== Videos ====
List of music video compilations, with selected chart positions, sales figures, and certifications
| Title | Video details | Peak chart positions | | Sales | Certifications |
| Title | Video details | JPN BD | JPN DVD | Sales | Certifications |
|---|---|---|---|---|---|
| Music Video Tour: 2010–2017 | Released: May 17, 2017; Label: Speedstar; Formats: Blu-ray, DVD | 1 | 1 | JPN: 152,606 (Note: Japanese combined Blu-ray and DVD sales for Music Video Tour: 2010–2017 as of December 2017: 84,463 DVDs + 68,143 Blu-rays (compiled from Oricon's year-end charts)) | RIAJ: Gold |
| Music Video Tour 2: 2017–2022 | Released: February 15, 2023; Label: Speedstar; Formats: Blu-ray, DVD | 1 | 1 | JPN: 36,000 (Note: Japanese first-week Blu-ray and DVD sales for Music Video Tour 2: 2017–2022: 25,000 Blu-rays + 11,000 DVDs (per Oricon report)) | |

==== Box set ====
Box set, with selected chart positions and sales figures
| Title | Box set details | Peak chart positions | | | Sales |
| Title | Box set details | JPN | JPN Comb. | JPN Hot | Sales |
|---|---|---|---|---|---|
| Gen Hoshino Singles Box: Gratitude | Released: October 21, 2020; Label: Speedstar; Format: CDs+DVDs | 4 | 4 | 3 | JPN: 51,905 (Note: Japanese physical box set sales for Gen Hoshino Singles Box: Gratitude as of January 2021, compiled by Oricon from the compilation's chart history) |

==== Miscellaneous ====
Miscellaneous compilation album, with release details and notes
| Title | Album details | Notes |
|---|---|---|
| Yellow Disc: Birthday Songs for Yuki Himura — Bananaman and Gen Hoshino 2010–2019 | Released: January 28, 2020 (bundle with the fourth issue of Hoshino's Yellow Magazine); Label: Speedstar; Format: CD | A CD containing ten birthday songs that Hoshino wrote for Bananaman's Yūki Himura since 2010. |

== Singles ==
=== As lead artist ===
List of singles as lead artist, with selected chart positions, sales figures, certifications, and associated album
| Title | Year | Peak chart positions | | | | | Sales | Certifications | Album |
| Title | Year | JPN | JPN Comb. (Note: The Oricon Combined Singles Chart was established in December 2018.) | JPN Hot | TWN | WW | Sales | Certifications | Album |
|---|---|---|---|---|---|---|---|---|---|
| "Kudaranai no Naka ni" (くだらないの中に; lit. 'In the Nonsense') | 2011 | 17 | — | 12 | — | — | JPN: 16,838 (Note: Japanese physical singles sales for "Kudaranai no Naka ni" as of April 2019, compiled by Oricon from the single's chart history) | | Episode |
| "Film" (フィルム, Firumu) | 2012 | 4 | — | 5 | — | — | JPN: 26,690 (Note: Japanese physical singles sales for "Film" as of April 2018, compiled by Oricon from the single's chart history) | | Stranger |
| "Yume no Soto e" (夢の外へ; lit. 'Out of the Dream') | 2012 | 8 | — | 4 | — | — | JPN: 145,620 (Note: Japanese total single sales for "Yume no Soto e" as of April 2018: 45,620 physical sales (compiled by Oricon from the single's chart history) + 100,000 downloads (from RIAJ certification)) | RIAJ (download): Gold | Stranger |
| "Shiranai" (知らない; lit. 'I Don't Know') | 2012 | 5 | — | 3 | — | — | JPN: 40,261 (Note: Japanese physical singles sales for "Shiranai" as of April 2018, compiled by Oricon from the single's chart history) | | Stranger |
| "Gag" (ギャグ, Gyagu) | 2013 | 4 | — | 8 | — | — | JPN: 35,308 (Note: Japanese physical singles sales for "Gag" as of April 2020, compiled by Oricon from the single's chart history) | | Non-album single |
| "Why Don't You Play in Hell?" (地獄でなぜ悪い, Jigoku de Naze Warui; lit. 'What's Bad About Hell?') | 2013 | 5 | — | 5 | — | — | JPN: 37,200 (Note: Japanese physical singles sales for "Why Don't You Play in Hell?" as of June 2014, compiled by Oricon from the single's chart history) | | Yellow Dancer |
| "Crazy Crazy" "Sakura no Mori" (桜の森; lit. 'Cherry Blossom Forest') (double A-side single) | 2014 | — | — | 7 | — | — | | | Yellow Dancer |
| "Crazy Crazy" "Sakura no Mori" (桜の森; lit. 'Cherry Blossom Forest') (double A-side single) | 2014 | 35 | — | 55 | — | — | JPN: 1,887 (Note: Japanese physical sales for "Sakura no Mori" as of December 2014, compiled by Oricon from the vinyl release's chart history) | | Yellow Dancer |
| "Crazy Crazy" "Sakura no Mori" (桜の森; lit. 'Cherry Blossom Forest') (double A-side single) | 2014 | 4 | — | — | — | — | JPN: 56,565 (Note: Japanese physical singles sales for "Crazy Crazy" / "Sakura no Mori" as of April 2018, compiled by Oricon from the single's chart history) | | Yellow Dancer |
| "Sun" | 2015 | 2 | — | 2 | — | — | JPN: 850,000 (Note: Japanese total single sales for "Sun" as of April 2018: 750,000 downloads + 100,000 physical sales (from RIAJ certifications)) | RIAJ (download): 3× Platinum; RIAJ (physical): Gold; RIAJ (streaming): Platinum | Yellow Dancer |
| "Koi" (恋; lit. 'Love') | 2016 | 2 | — | 1 | — | — | JPN: 2,318,017 (Note: Japanese total single sales for "Koi" as of January 2019: 318,017 physical sales (compiled by Oricon from the album's chart history) + 2,000,000 downloads (from RIAJ certification)) | RIAJ (download): 2× Million; RIAJ (physical): Platinum; RIAJ (streaming): Platinum | Pop Virus |
| "Family Song" | 2017 | 1 | — | 1 | — | — | JPN: 500,000 (Note: Japanese total single sales for "Family Song" as of September 2018: 250,000 physical sales + 250,000 downloads (from RIAJ certification)) | RIAJ (physical): Platinum; RIAJ (download): Platinum; RIAJ (streaming): Platinum | Pop Virus |
| "Doraemon" (ドラえもん) | 2018 | 1 | — | 1 | — | — | JPN: 395,167 (Note: Japanese total single sales for "Doraemon" as of March 2019: 195,167 physical sales (compiled by Oricon from the album's chart history) + 250,000 downloads (from RIAJ certification)) | RIAJ (download): Platinum; RIAJ (physical): Gold; RIAJ (streaming): Gold | Non-album single |
| "Idea" (アイデア, Aidea) | 2018 | — | 11 | 1 | — | — | JPN: 250,000 (Note: Japanese digital single sales for "Idea" as of September 2018, based on RIAJ certification) | RIAJ (download): Platinum; RIAJ (streaming): Platinum | Pop Virus |
| "Halfway" (折り合い, Oriai; lit. 'Compromise') | 2020 | — | 27 | 26 | — | — | | | Non-album single |
| "Fushigi" (不思議; lit. 'Miracle') "Create" (創造, Sōzō) (double A-side single) | 2021 | — | 9 | 1 | — | — (Note: "Fushigi" did not enter the Billboard Global 200, but reached number 71 on the Billboard Global Excl. US chart.) | | RIAJ (streaming): Platinum | Gen |
| "Fushigi" (不思議; lit. 'Miracle') "Create" (創造, Sōzō) (double A-side single) | 2021 | — | 10 | 7 | — | — (Note: "Create" did not enter the Billboard Global 200, but reached number 94 on the Billboard Global Excl. US chart.) | | RIAJ (streaming): Gold | Gen |
| "Fushigi" (不思議; lit. 'Miracle') "Create" (創造, Sōzō) (double A-side single) | 2021 | 2 | 2 | — | — | — | JPN: 157,686 (Note: Japanese physical singles sales for "Fushigi" / "Create" as of January 2024, compiled by Oricon from the single's chart history) | RIAJ (physical): Gold | Gen |
| "Cube" | 2021 | — | 25 | 4 | — | — | | | Non-album single |
| "Comedy" (喜劇, Kigeki) | 2022 | — | 11 | 4 | 21 | 127 | JPN: 100,000 (Note: Japanese digital single sales for "Comedy" as of July 2022, based on RIAJ certification) | RIAJ (download): Gold; RIAJ (streaming): Platinum | Gen |
| "I Wanna Be Your Ghost" (異世界混合大舞踏会, Isekai Kongō Dai-butōkai; lit. 'Grand Stage of Parallel Worlds') | 2022 | — | 26 | 6 | — | — | | | Gen |
| "Why" (光の跡, Hikari no Ato; lit. 'Traces of Light') "Life" (生命体, Seimeitai) (double A-side single) | 2023 | — | — | 3 | — | — | | | Gen |
| "Why" (光の跡, Hikari no Ato; lit. 'Traces of Light') "Life" (生命体, Seimeitai) (double A-side single) | 2023 | — | 44 | 7 | — | — | | | Gen |
| "Why" (光の跡, Hikari no Ato; lit. 'Traces of Light') "Life" (生命体, Seimeitai) (double A-side single) | 2023 | 2 | 2 | — | — | — | JPN: 54,651 (Note: Japanese physical singles sales for "Why" / "Life" as of March 2023, compiled by Oricon from the single's chart history) | | Gen |
| "Eureka" | 2025 | — | 33 | 11 | — | — | | | Gen |
| "Fake" (as Akira Nise) | 2025 | — | — (Note: The solo version of "Fake" did not enter the Oricon Combined Singles Chart, but reached number 14 on the Oricon Digital Singles chart.) | — (Note: The solo version of "Fake" did not enter the Japan Hot 100, but reached number six on the Billboard Japan Top Download Songs chart.) | — | — | | | Non-album singles |
| "Dead End" (いきどまり, Ikidomari) | 2025 | — | 50 | 8 | — | — | | | Non-album singles |
| "Suki" (好き) | 2026 | — | — (Note: "Suki" did not enter the Oricon Combined Singles Chart, but reached number five on the Oricon Digital Singles chart.) | 16 | — | — | | | Non-album singles |
"—" denotes a recording that did not chart or was not eligible to chart. For double A-side singles, the first two rows refers to the A-side tracks, and the third row refers to chart positions, sales, and certifications for the double A-side release.

=== As featured artist ===
Single as featured artist, with associated album
| Title | Year | Album |
|---|---|---|
| "Into the Sun" (Superorganism featuring Gen Hoshino, Stephen Malkmus, Pi Ja Ma, and Axel Concato) | 2022 | World Wide Pop |

=== Promotional singles ===
List of promotional singles, with selected chart positions, sales figures, certifications, and associated album
| Title | Year | Peak chart positions | | Sales | Certifications | Album |
| Title | Year | JPN Comb. | JPN Hot | Sales | Certifications | Album |
|---|---|---|---|---|---|---|
| "Kuse no Uta" (くせのうた; lit. 'Habit Song') | 2010 | — | 51 | | | Baka no Uta |
| "Nichijō" (日常; lit. 'Everyday Life') | 2011 | — | 50 | | | Episode |
| "Dokusho" (読書; lit. 'Reading') (Yuri Miyauchi featuring Gen Hoshino) | 2011 | — | — | | | Working Holiday |
| "Kazoku Nan Desu" (家族なんです; lit. 'We're Family') | 2011 | — | — | | | Non-album promotional single |
| "Week End" | 2015 | — | 21 | JPN: 100,000 (Note: Japanese digital sales for "Week End" as of November 2017, based on RIAJ certification) | RIAJ (download): Gold | Yellow Dancer |
| "Pop Virus" | 2018 | 29 | 8 | | RIAJ (streaming): Gold | Pop Virus |
| "Same Thing" (featuring Superorganism) | 2019 | 27 | 12 | | | Same Thing (EP) |
| "Dancing on the Inside" (うちで踊ろう, Uchi de Odorō) | 2020 | — | 13 | | | Non-album promotional singles |
| "Dancing on the Inside" (Potluck Mix) | 2020 | — | — | | | Non-album promotional singles |
| "Comedy" (remix; featuring DJ Jazzy Jeff and Kaidi Tatham) | 2022 | — (Note: "Comedy" (featuring DJ Jazzy Jeff and Kaidi Tatham) did not enter the Oricon Combined Singles chart, but reached number 19 on the Oricon Digital Singles chart.) | — (Note: "Comedy" (featuring DJ Jazzy Jeff and Kaidi Tatham) did not enter the Japan Hot 100, but reached number 19 on the Billboard Japan Top Download Songs chart.) | | | Non-album promotional singles |
| "Star" | 2025 | — | 12 | | | Gen |
| "Mad Hope" (featuring Louis Cole, Sam Gendel, and Sam Wilkes) | 2025 | — | 37 | | | Gen |
"—" denotes a recording that did not chart or was not eligible to chart.

== Other charted songs ==
List of other charted songs, with selected chart positions, sales figures, certifications, and associated album
| Title | Year | Peak chart positions | | Sales | Certifications | Album |
| Title | Year | JPN Comb. | JPN Hot | Sales | Certifications | Album |
|---|---|---|---|---|---|---|
| "Uta o Utau Toki wa" (歌を歌う時は; lit. 'When You Sing Songs') | 2011 | — | — (Note: "Uta o Utau Toki wa" did not enter the Japan Hot 100, but reached number 75 on the Billboard Japan Top Download Songs chart.) | | | "Kudaranai no Naka ni" (single) |
| "Bakemono" (化物; lit. 'Monster') | 2013 | — | 25 | | | Stranger |
| "Tokiyo" (時よ; lit. 'Time') | 2015 | — | 21 | JPN: 100,000 (Note: Japanese digital sales for "Tokiyo" as of February 2017, based on RIAJ certification) | RIAJ (download): Gold | Yellow Dancer |
| "Hada" (肌; lit. 'Skin') | 2017 | — | 18 | | | Pop Virus (Note: "Hada" was released as a B-side on the "Family Song" single a year before Pop Virus.) |
| "Koko ni Inai Anata e" (ここにいないあなたへ; lit. 'To You Who Isn't Here') | 2018 | — | 39 | | | "Doraemon" (single) |
| "Sapiens" (サピエンス, Sapiensu) | 2018 | — | — (Note: "Sapiens" did not enter the Japan Hot 100, but reached number 86 on the Billboard Japan Top Download Songs chart.) | | | Pop Virus |
| "Hello Song" | 2018 | 30 | 25 | | | Pop Virus |
| "Sarashi-mono" (さらしもの; lit. 'Fool') (featuring Punpee) | 2019 | 26 | 20 | | | Same Thing (EP) |
| "Ain't Nobody Know" (featuring Tom Misch) | 2019 | — (Note: "Ain't Nobody Know" did not enter the Oricon Combined Singles chart, but reached number 32 on the Oricon Streaming Songs chart.) | 25 | | | Same Thing (EP) |
| "Watashi" (私; lit. 'I') | 2019 | — | — (Note: "Watashi" did not enter the Japan Hot 100, but reached number 63 on the Billboard Japan Top Streaming Songs chart.) | | | Same Thing (EP) |
| "Dancing on the Inside" (New Year's Eve) (大晦日, Ōmisoka) | 2021 | — (Note: "Dancing on the Inside" (New Year's Eve) did not enter the Oricon Combined Singles chart, but reached number 32 on the Oricon Digital Singles chart.) | — | | | "Fushigi" / "Create" (single) |
| "Tomato" (そしたら, Soshitara; lit. 'So') | 2021 | — | — (Note: "Tomato" did not enter the Japan Hot 100, but reached number 89 on the Billboard Japan Top Download Songs chart.) | | | "Fushigi" / "Create" (single) |
| "Nomad" (with Zion.T) | 2021 | — | — (Note: "Nomad" did not enter the Japan Hot 100, but reached number 10 and 75 on the Japan Hot Overseas and Top Download Songs charts, respectively.) | | | Shang-Chi and the Legend of the Ten Rings: The Album |
| "Odd Couple" (おともだち, Otomodachi; lit. 'Friends') | 2023 | — | — (Note: "Odd Couple" did not enter the Japan Hot 100, but reached number 70 on the Billboard Japan Top Download Songs chart.) | | | "Why" / "Life" (single) |
| "Fake" (as Akira Nise featuring Mamoru Miyabi, Usuno Haruo, and Mane Kamishiraishi) | 2025 | — (Note: "Fake" featuring Mamoru Miyabi, Usono Haruo, and Mane Kamishiraishi did not enter the Oricon Combined Singles chart, but reached number 13 on the Oricon Digital Singles chart.) | — (Note: "Fake" featuring Mamoru Miyabi, Usono Haruo, and Mane Kamishiraishi did not enter the Japan Hot 100, but reached number 12 on the Billboard Japan Top Download Songs chart.) | | | "Fake" (single) |
"—" denotes a recording that did not chart or was not eligible to chart.

== Music videos ==
List of music videos as lead artist, showing year released, directors, and relevant album
| Title | Year | Director(s) | Album | Ref. |
As lead artist
| "Kuse no Uta" | 2010 | Ichirō Yamada (Note: Ichirō Yamada is an art team made up of Hoshino, the designer Daijirō Ōhara, and the film director Santa Yamagishi.) | Baka no Uta | |
| "Kudaranai no Naka ni" | 2011 | Ichirō Yamada | Episode | |
| "Nichijō" | 2011 | Ichirō Yamada | Episode | |
| "Film" | 2012 | Shūichi Okita | Stranger | |
| "Yume no Soto e" | 2012 | Yasuyuki Yamaguchi | Stranger | |
| "Shiranai" | 2012 | Yasuyuki Yamaguchi | Stranger | |
| "Bakemono" | 2013 | Shōichi David Haruyama; Gen Hoshino | Stranger | |
| "Gag" | 2013 | Gen Hoshino | None | |
| "Why Don't You Play in Hell?" | 2013 | Gen Hoshino; Naoyuki Asano | Yellow Dancer | |
| "Kisetsu" | 2014 | Nobuhiro Yamashita | Stranger | |
| "Crazy Crazy" | 2014 | Shōichi David Haruyama; Gen Hoshino | Yellow Dancer | |
| "Sun" | 2015 | Kazuaki Seki | Yellow Dancer | |
| "Snow Men" | 2015 | Hidenobu Tanabe | Yellow Dancer | |
| "Tokiyo" | 2015 | Kazuaki Seki | Yellow Dancer | |
| "Koi" | 2016 | Kazuaki Seki | Pop Virus | |
| "Family Song" | 2017 | Kazuaki Seki | Pop Virus | |
| "Doraemon" | 2018 | Kazuaki Seki | None | |
| "Idea" | 2018 | Kazuaki Seki | Pop Virus | |
| "Pop Virus" | 2018 | Kyōtarō Hayashi | Pop Virus | |
| "Same Thing" (featuring Superorganism) | 2019 | Tomokazu Yamada; Gen Hoshino | Same Thing (EP) | |
| "Ain't Nobody Know" (featuring Tom Misch) | 2020 | Kyōtarō Hayashi | Same Thing (EP) | |
| "Watashi" | 2020 | Pennacky | Same Thing (EP) | |
| "Sarashi-mono" (featuring Punpee) | 2020 | Ryū Okubo | Same Thing (EP) | |
| "Halfway" | 2020 | Shō Miyake | None | |
| "Create" | 2021 | Yoshiyuki Okuyama | Gen | |
| "Fushigi" | 2021 | Kyōtarō Hayashi | Gen | |
| "Cube" | 2021 | Mikiko | None | |
| "Nomad" (Zion.T and Gen Hoshino) | 2021 | Gen Hoshino; Kim Jin-yu | Shang-Chi and the Legend of the Ten Rings: The Album | |
| "Comedy" | 2022 | Mess | Gen | |
| "I Wanna Be Your Ghost" | 2022 | Yūki Igarashi | Gen | |
| "Life" | 2023 | GroupN | Gen | |
| "Why" | 2023 | Kyōtarō Hayashi | Gen | |
| "Eureka" | 2025 | Kotori Kawashima | Gen | |
| "Star" | 2025 | Takuto Okamoto | Gen | |
| "Mad Hope" (featuring Louis Cole, Sam Gendel, and Sam Wilkes) | 2025 | ARuFa | Gen | |
| "2" (featuring Lee Young-ji) | 2025 | Hideyuki Ishii | Gen | |
| "Memories" (featuring Umi and Camilo) | 2025 | Hiroya Hanaiba (GroupN) | Gen | |
| "Dead End" | 2025 | Takuto Okamoto | None | |
| "Glitch" | 2025 | Mimicry Meta | Gen | |
| "Suki" | 2026 | Gen Hoshino | None | |
As featuring artist
| "Dokusho" (Yuri Miyauchi featuring Gen Hoshino) | 2011 | Daisuke Kawashima (Note: Credited by his production company, Kawashima Tekkojo) | Working Holiday | |
| "Into the Sun" (Superorganism featuring Gen Hoshino, Stephen Malkmus, Pi Ja Ma, and Axel Concato) | 2022 | AEVA | World Wide Pop | |

== Other works ==
=== Guest appearances ===
List of non-single guest appearances, with performers, credits, and associated album
| Song | Year | Artist(s) | Credit(s) | Album |
|---|---|---|---|---|
| "Chingiri-dera" (チン斬り寺; lit. 'Chingiri Temple') | 2004 | Tom Miyazaki | Composition, arrangement | Miyazaki Tom Kinen-kan |
| "Tingue Bossa Bosa Bossa Nova" | 2006 | Tom Miyazaki | Composition | Kondo mo Mise Jimai, Konya de Mise Jimai 2nd Season |
| "Taiyaki" (たいやき; lit. 'Baked Sea Bream') | 2006 | Hisashi Yoshino and Gen Hoshino | Performer | 4 Tracks Burning! |
| "Rose and Beast" (薔薇と野獣, Bara to Yajū) (cover of Haruomi Hosono) | 2006 | Ren Takada featuring Gen Hoshino | Performer | 12 Notes |
| "Kakurete Nai de" (かくれてないで; lit. 'Don't Hide') | 2007 | Saho Terao | Acoustic guitar | Onmi |
| "Daisy Omisoshiru" (デイジーお味噌汁, Deijī Omisoshiru; lit. 'Daisy Miso Soup') | 2008 | Gen Hoshino | Performer | Daisy Holiday (V.A. Presented by Hosono Haruomi) (Note: "Daisy Omisoshiru" was later included on Baka no Uta.) |
| "Otenkiame" (お天気雨; lit. 'Sun Shower') | 2009 | Saho Terao | Acoustic guitar | Ai no Himitsu |
| "Wuhan no Hito" (ウーハンの女, Ūhan no Hito; lit. 'Girl from Wuhan') | 2009 | Asa-Chang & Junray | Lyrics | Kage no Nai Hito |
| "Banana Oiwake" (バナナ追分; lit. 'Banana Folk Song') | 2011 | Haruomi Hosono | Songwriting | HoSoNoVa |
| "Lucky Strike" (ラッキー・ストライク, Rakkī Sutoraiku) (cover of Raymond Scott) | 2013 | Gen Hoshino | Performer | Raymond Scott Song Book |
| "All Things Must Pass" (cover of George Harrison) | 2014 | Yoshie Nakano and Gen Hoshino | Vocals | Ringo no Komori-uta: Apple of the Best Eye |
| "Happy Xmas (War Is Over)" (cover of the Plastic Ono Band) | 2014 | Various | Vocals | Ringo no Komori-uta: Apple of the Best Eye |
| "Ima" (今; lit. 'Now') | 2017 | Kanjani Eight | Songwriting (Note: Credited by his alter ego, Akira Nise) | Jam |
| None | 2019 | Haruomi Hosono | Compiler | Hosono Haruomi Compiled by Hoshino Gen |
| "Otona" (lit. 'Adult') | 2019 | Noritake Kinashi featuring Toshinobu Kubota | Lyrics (Note: Credited as Hoshino Seikaten) | Kinashi Funk the Best |
| "Good in Bed" (Gen Hoshino remix) | 2020 | Dua Lipa | Remixer | Club Future Nostalgia |
| "Nomad" | 2021 | Zion.T and Gen Hoshino | Vocals, songwriting | Shang-Chi and the Legend of the Ten Rings: The Album |

=== Streaming-exclusive playlists ===
List of selected streaming-exclusive official playlists, with details and descriptions
| Title | Details | Notes |
|---|---|---|
| Gen Hoshino Essentials (はじめての星野源, Hajimete no Hoshino Gen; lit. 'Your Start to Gen Hoshino') | Released: undated; Platform: Apple Music | Playlists containing select songs or music videos from Hoshino's discography |
| Gen Hoshino: Video Essentials (はじめての星野源: ビデオ, Hajimete no Hoshino Gen: Bideo; lit. 'Your Start to Gen Hoshino: Videos') | Released: undated; Platform: Apple Music | Playlists containing select songs or music videos from Hoshino's discography |
| Gen Hoshino: Deep Cuts (通のための星野源, Tsū no Tame no Hoshino Gen; lit. 'Gen Hoshino for Insight') | Released: undated; Platform: Apple Music | Playlists containing select songs or music videos from Hoshino's discography |
| Gen Hoshino: Love Songs (星野源: ラブソング, Hoshino Gen: Rabu Songu) | Released: undated; Platform: Apple Music | Playlists containing select songs or music videos from Hoshino's discography |
| At Home with Gen Hoshino (星野源 選曲: うちで過ごそう, Hoshino Gen Senkyoku: Uchi de Sugosō; lit. 'Gen Hoshino Selects: Spend Time at Home') | Released: undated; Platform: Apple Music | Playlist containing twenty-two songs by various artists, concluded by Hoshino's "Dancing on the Inside" |
| Best of Hoshino Gen (Best of 星野源) | Released: undated; Platform: Amazon Music | Playlists containing select songs from Hoshino's discography |
| Hoshino Gen Greatest Hits (星野 源 Greatest Hits) | Released: undated; Platform: Line Music | Playlists containing select songs from Hoshino's discography |
| So Sad So Happy | Released: November 1, 2019; Platform: Spotify | Playlist of songs compiled by Hoshino, including both his own and tracks by various artists; Created on November 1, 2019, with 42 songs; four more songs have been added through 2022 |
| Inner Visions Hour | Released: June 13, 2021; Platform: Apple Music | Playlist of songs selected by Hoshino based on themes featured on his DJ program Inner Visions Hour with Gen Hoshino; In order of episode, based on the themes of: 'the Heart', 'Summer', 'Foolishness', 'Create', 'Breakthrough', and 'Love'; Updated from creation until August 1, 2021 |
| Gen Hoshino: 'Go Stream' Video Single | Released: September 16, 2022; Platform: Spotify | Live studio performances of "Comedy", "Fushigi", and "I Wanna Be Your Ghost", recorded for Spotify's Go Stream series |
| This Is 星野源 (Gen Hoshino) | Released: December 26, 2023; Platform: Spotify | Playlist of select songs from Hoshino's discography |
| Inochi no Shasō kara 2 (いのちの車窓から2; lit. 'From the Car Window of Life 2') | Released: October 4, 2024; Platform: various | Playlist of songs from Hoshino's discography, selected based on themes discussed in his book of the same name |
| With Love Tiffany Holiday 2024 | Released: December 5, 2024; Platform: Spotify | Widely released on December 5 via the Spotify of WWD Japan; available since November 21 through QR codes found in Japanese Tiffany & Co. stores and on the chain's Line account; Playlist of 26 songs by various artists that Hoshino DJ'd at the opening event for a Tiffany Wonder exhibit in April 2024 |
| Presenting Gen Hoshino | Released: 2025; Platform: YouTube Music | Playlist of select songs from Hoshino's discography |

=== Miscellaneous releases ===
List of miscellaneous music releases, with details and notes
| Title | Release details | Notes |
|---|---|---|
| Yellow Disc: Special Radio Show — Coffee Shop Hoshino | Released: January 2022 (bundle with the sixth issue of Hoshino's Yellow Magazine); Label: Speedstar; Format: CD | A special episode of Hoshino's All Night Nippon radio show where he chats with actor Kazuki Iio in a coffee shop.; The CD also includes an audio recording of a rap version of "Pop Virus" that Hoshino performed with comedian Masayasu Wakabayashi on a different episode of All Night Nippon. |
| Hoshino Gen no All Night Nippon: Listener Dai-kansha Party | Released: June 8, 2022; Label: Speedstar; Formats: Blu-ray, DVD | A video release of the All Night Nippon offline event of the same name.; The release also includes an audio recording of "Kimi to Hoshi", an original song that Hoshino wrote for the event. |
