= Lighthouse (EP) =

EP by Gen Hoshino
- Released: September 8, 2023
- Length: 14:24
- Language: Japanese
- Label: Speedstar; Netflix Music
- Producer: Gen Hoshino

Gen Hoshino chronology
Gen Hoshino Singles Box: Gratitude (2020)	Lighthouse (2023)	Gen (2025)

Lighthouse (stylized in all caps; Japanese pronunciation: [ɾaitohaꜜɯsɯ]) is the second extended play (EP) by Japanese singer-songwriter and musician Gen Hoshino. It contains six songs that Hoshino wrote for the six-episode talk show of the same, which he hosted on Netflix with comedian Masayasu Wakabayashi of Audrey. The EP was released by Speedstar Records and Netflix Music on September 8, 2023, and features performances from Wakabayashi and American instrumentalists Louis Cole, Sam Gendel, and Sam Wilkes.

Music critics were favorable to specific tracks on the track listing; songs highlighted were "Responder", "Mad Hope", and "Orange" featuring Wakabayashi. The EP peaked at number 6 on the Billboard Japan Hot Albums and at number 18 on the Oricon Combined Singles Chart.

== Background and writing ==
Singer-songwriter Gen Hoshino and owarai comedian Masayasu Wakabayashi of Audrey first collaborated in 2011, when they appeared at the same ōgiri event in Shimokitazawa, Tokyo. In July 2021, Hoshino guest starred on Audrey's television program, Achikochi Audrey, where he and Wakabayashi discussed what pop culture journalist Louie Takeshima described as "ugly, swirling" emotions. The episode inspired producer Nobuyuki Sakuma, who was head of the program's production at the time, to create a talk show co-starring Wakabayashi and Hoshino. He brought the idea to Netflix, who released all six episodes for streaming as Lighthouse on August 22, 2023. The talk show sees Hoshino and Wakabayashi discussing worries based upon a "one-line diary" that they would write each month before episodes.

According to Sakuma, Hoshino responded favorably when presented with the premise for the show. During a briefing session, he suddenly proposed writing a song for each episode of the series, to which Sakuma responded: "If you say so, please do." Based upon his conversations with Wakabayashi in the respective episodes, Hoshino wrote six songs for the show: five ending themes and an opening, "Mad Hope". (Note: Each episode of Lighthouse uses a different ending theme, except for episode five, which does not feature an ending.) Writing of the tracks was simultaneous with several other projects, including the single "Life" (2023); Hoshino reflected in a Wired Japan interview that the Lighthouse tracks were the most relaxing to write in this period.

== Production and music ==
The extended play (EP), also titled Lighthouse, runs for 14 minutes and 12 seconds, and contains the six songs from the talk show. Though Hoshino originally intended to perform all songs in a one-man acoustic style, he quickly found this approach boring, and instead employed varying production styles across the tracks, including solo acoustic, a band sound, and programming. Writing for Rockin'On Japan, Amano Fumiaki considered a live band sound to be at "the core" of the EP. Hoshino programmed demos that he would then record live with a small set of musicians, a method they used due to its time efficiency compared to standard studio recording and arrangement.

The production of the EP was compared by Hoshino to the writing of soundtrack, as he would consider what feelings the songs should invoke in viewers after episodes. With the pretense of the talk show, he felt able to turn his style in a harsher direction than his previous works; since they would follow and represent his conversations with Wakabayashi, Hoshino used sharper and more direct words that he believed would appear narcissistic on his other works. The same applied to Lighthouse's sound, where he included more warped vocals and drums.

=== Songs ===
"Outcast"
Track three, "Outcast", features a style harsher than Hoshino's previous works.

The opener and title track, "Lighthouse", is an acoustic guitar-led number where Hoshino recounts his early career as a musician in the Asagaya neighborhood of Suginami, Tokyo, where Wakabayashi was at the same time practicing his manzai act. In the final line, Hoshino accounts his perspective on the talk show as a place for him and Wakabayashi to discuss worries, but not solve them: "Lighthouse/Don't think about saving people/Just keep shining light". It is followed by the album-oriented rock and blue-eyed soul-reminiscent "Responder".

"Outcast", which features a sound harsher than previous works in Hoshino's catalogue, is about shining light in areas never before visited. Wakabayashi, under the stage name MC. Waka, performs rap vocals on the fourth track, "Orange". Wakabayashi wrote the first verse after the recording of the talk show's first episode. He revealed this to Hoshino in the fourth episode, where Hoshino responds by offering to write a matching composition; it is used as the same episode's ending theme. Wakabayashi raps about his frustrations during his and Hoshino's time in Asagaya and Kōenji, and how these irritations still effect them in their present positions within the entertainment industry.

The fifth and final ending theme, "Dancing Reluctantly", is about living reluctantly and how Hoshino and Wakabayashi will continue to worry even after the show's conclusion. The EP's closer and the talk show's opening theme, "Mad Hope", is a 35-second collaboration with American instrumentalists Louis Cole (drums), Sam Gendel (electric bass), and Sam Wilkes (alto saxophone). A full-length version was recorded for Hoshino's sixth full-length album, Gen (2025).

== Release and reception ==
The Lighthouse EP was announced on September 4, 2023, and was released for download and streaming four days later by Hoshino's label, Speedstar Records, and Netflix Music. Upon release, the EP received 5,474 paid downloads, which was the second-highest of that week behind only Layover, the debut EP by BTS member V. Lighthouse debuted at number 6 on the Billboard Japan Hot Albums dated September 13, 2023, and at number 18 on the Oricon Combined Albums Chart dated September 18. Music critics primarily covered Lighthouse on the subject of specific songs. Tomoyuki Mori for Real Sound reviewed "Orange", where he thought Wakabayashi's rhymes and rhythm displayed a respect for Japanese hip hop. Rockin'On Japan's Amano praised the "somber, warm, and shining" sound of "Responder", and expressed excitement towards a full-length version of "Mad Hope", as was later released on the Gen album.

Wakabayashi performed "Orange" during Audrey's radio festival at the Tokyo Dome on February 18, 2024, where Hoshino made a surprise guest appearance. Hoshino included "Outcast" on the setlist for his timeslot at the Rock in Japan Festival in August 2024, and named the 2025 headlining tour for the Gen album after "Mad Hope".

== Personnel ==
Credits adapted from Lighthouse on Hoshino's official website

- Gen Hoshino – lead vocals, production, songwriting, arrangement; background vocals (3–6); acoustic guitar (1); analog synthesizer (4–6); software synthesizer (4–5); digital synthesizer (6); (Note: Types of analog synthesizers played by Hoshino: Minimoog (3–4); Casio CZ-1 (4, 6); Roland Jupiter-8 (5); Roland Jupiter-6, Prophet-5 (6). The software synthesizer refers to Blazio SA-10, a plugin for Ableton Live, and the digital synth is a Yamaha DX7.) electric piano (4); programming (6)
- Ryosuke Nagaoka – arrangement of background vocals; background vocals (2–6); electric guitar (2–3, 5–6)
- Tom Tamada – drums (2–3, 5)
- Louis Cole – drums (6)
- Jungo Miura – electric bass (2–3, 5)
- Sam Wilkes – electric bass (6)
- Hirotaka Sakurada – digital synthesizer/Roland JD-800 (2); analog synthesizer/Prophet-10 (3, 5)
- Masayasu Wakabayashi (MC. Waka) – rap vocals, lyrics (4)
- Sam Gendel – alto saxophone (6)
- Shu Saida – recording
- Shojiro Watanabe – mixing
- Takahiro Uchida – mastering

== Track listing ==
Lighthouse
No.	Title	Length
1.	"Lighthouse" (Live Session; 灯台, Tōdai)	3:07
2.	"Responder" (Live Session; 解答者, Kaitō-sha)	3:37
3.	"Outcast" (Live Session; 仲間はずれ, Nakama Hazure)	1:56
4.	"Orange" (featuring MC. Waka)	2:46
5.	"Dancing Reluctantly" (Live Session; しかたなく踊る, Shikatanaku Odoru)	2:23
6.	"Mad Hope" (Short; featuring Louis Cole and Sam Gendel)	0:35
Total length:		14:24

Notes

- All tracks are written, produced, arranged solely by Gen Hoshino, except for track four ("Orange"), which features lyrics co-written with Masayasu Wakabayashi (MC. Waka).
- On the extended version of track six ("Mad Hope") included on the Gen album, alto saxophonist Sam Wilkes is credited as featuring artist. Though he performs on Lighthouse's short version, he is not named as an artist.

== Charts ==
=== Weekly charts ===
Weekly chart performance for Lighthouse
Chart (2023)	Peak position
Japanese Albums (Billboard Japan Hot)	6
Japanese Combined Albums (Oricon)	18

=== Year-end charts ===
Year-end chart performance for Lighthouse (2023)
Chart (2023)	Position
Japanese Top Download Albums (Billboard Japan)	21

== See also ==
- "Odd Couple" (song), a theme song written by Hoshino for Wakabayashi's comedy duo Audrey
