= Dead End (song) =

Single by Gen Hoshino
- Language: Japanese
- Released: November 14, 2025
- Length: 2:47
- Label: Speedstar
- Songwriter: Gen Hoshino
- Producer: Gen Hoshino

Gen Hoshino singles chronology
"Eureka" (2025)	"Dead End" (2025)	"Suki" (2026)

Music video
- "Dead End" on YouTube

"Dead End" (Japanese: いきどまり, Hepburn: Ikidomari) is a song by the Japanese singer-songwriter Gen Hoshino. It was released by Speedstar Records as a digital single on November 14, 2025. Hoshino wrote and produced the song for the romance film Hiraba no Tsuki upon in-person request from the director and producer during their visit to his home studio. "Dead End" is a ballad featuring only Hoshino's soulful vocals and a piano accompaniment performed by Hirotaka Sakurada. The lyrics depict the first-person perspective of a person's road to acceptance after the eternal departing of another person.

"Dead End" reached numbers 8 and 50 on the Billboard Japan Hot 100 and Oricon Combined Singles Charts, respectively, and number 1 on both publications' digital-only charts. Music critics in Japan commented on the song's minimalistic arrangement and the emotional themes of its lyrics. A music video, directed by Takuto Okamoto and released alongside the digital single, features Hoshino wandering a night-time city.

== Background ==
"Dead End" was written for Hiraba no Tsuki, a live-action film based on a 2018 novel by Kasumi Asakura about adult life romance. It stars Masato Sakai as a newly divorced man returning to his hometown, where he is reunited with his middle school love interest, portrayed by Haruka Igawa, who has been widowed by her husband. Director Nobuhiro Doi and producer Jun Nasuda visited Hoshino at his home studio, 808, where they asked him to write the film's theme song. Hoshino and Nasuda had previously worked together on the TBS television dramas Kounodori: Dr. Stork (2015–17), The Full-Time Wife Escapist (2016), and Slow Train (2025).

== Composition and lyrics ==
2 minutes and 47 seconds long, "Dead End" is a sentimental ballad with elements of soul, jazz, and alternative music. The song's minimal arrangement consists only of Hoshino's soulful vocals and a piano accompaniment performed by Hirotaka Sakurada. In the track's latter half, Hoshino's vocals are polyphonic, in a spiritual style that Musica 's Jin Otabe thought somewhat resembled that of American singer Justin Vernon. The song does not include a proper intro nor outro and was described as "tranquil" in its sound by Rockin'On Japan's Fumiaki Amano, who wrote: "This minimal world of just piano and vocals [...] is adorned with spatial processing and overdubs [...] deep within its tranquility [and simple arrangement] is an intricate musical movement."

The lyrics of "Dead End", which are about the warmths and sadnesses of human love, are set from the perspective of a protagonist who faces an eternal departing with a second person and depicts the speaker's journey to acceptance. The protagonist proclaims that they and the other person will continue their connection outside worldy means and reunite after rebirth, before backtracking and declaring these statements lies. By the end of the song, the speaker stops deceiving themself and accepts reality, saying that they will "just burn out, fade, and disappear". Otabe wrote that the song depicts how humans carry emotions as they head towards an inevitable "dead end". Hoshino, who wrote the song on piano after reading the film's screenplay, described the first-person lyrics as a departure from his recent self-autobiographical works. Musicman news editors considered "Dead End" a "diverging mode" from his self-titled album Gen released in May earlier that year.

== Release and promotion ==
External video
- Hiraba no Tsuki special trailer featuring "Dead End" on YouTube

"Dead End" was announced as the theme song to Hiraba no Tsuki on September 8, 2025, and partly appeared in a trailer released the same day. An extended trailer, also featuring the song, was released on November 10. "Dead End" was released as a single for download and streaming by Speedstar Records at midnight on November 14, 2025, the same day as the film's premiere. Its cover art, according to The First Times, depicts two "poetic" illustrations of birds flying in a flock: one image is from far away and the other is close-up. The cover was designed by Hiromi Fujita and illustrated by Woshibai, an artist from Shanghai, China. The release of "Dead End" came five months after Gen and shortly after the conclusion of its headlining tour, Mad Hope. Amano described it as a "quiet reverberation" to the album and its promotional efforts.

Prior to the song's release, a teaser for its music video was uploaded to Hoshino's YouTube channel on November 12, 2025. The full video, directed by Takuto Okamoto, was released alongside the song on November 14, and depicts Hoshino wandering alone in a night-time city. Behind-the-scenes and unused footage from the video was uploaded on December 12.

== Reception ==
Writing for Real Sound, Tomoyuki Mori considered "Dead End" a "necessity" to Hiraba no Tsuki and described its minimalistic arrangement as "endlessly beautiful and transient". Fumiaki Amano for Rockin' On Japan and Jin Otabe for Musica both considered the song an instant "classic"; Otabe wrote that, following Gen, "Hoshino's creativity [was] not hitting the breaks" and Amano thought the lyrics' themes about pain and forgiveness "sink into the soul", such as in a line where the speaker comments on the other person's "mistake-ridden kindness". Hirokazu Koike, another writer for Musica, commended the songwriting for portraying the protagonist's road to acceptance in under three minutes. Miho Takahashi, the third reviewer in Musica, framed the acoustic style of "Dead End" to Hoshino's early guitar-driven works, but wrote that his "appeal is completely different".

Commercially, "Dead End" peaked at numbers 8 and 50 on the Billboard Japan Hot 100 and Oricon Combined Singles Charts, respectively. Within its first week, the song sold 7,443 paid digital copies and reached number one on the download charts of both publications; on the Oricon Digital Singles Chart, it was Hoshino's seventh total number one. Although it had earlier been issued in a radio edit version, "Dead End" did not receive significant airplay until its full release. The full version debuted at number 23 on the on-air chart of radio surveyist Plantech dated November 19, before rising in airplay 651% the next week and taking number 1 in a "landslide".

== Personnel ==
Adapted from "Dead End" at Hoshino's official website

- Gen Hoshino – vocals, background vocals, songwriting, arrangement, arrangement of background vocals, production
- Hirotaka Sakurada – piano
- Shojiro Watanabe – recording, mixing
- Shu Saida – recording
- Takahiro Uchida – mastering

== Charts ==
Weekly chart performance for "Dead End"
Chart (2025)	Peak position
Japan (Billboard Japan Hot 100)	8
Japan Combined (Oricon)	50

== Release history ==
Release date and formats for "Eureka"
Region	Date	Format(s)	Label	Ref.
Japan	Unknown	Radio airplay (radio edit version)	Unknown	
Various	November 14, 2025	Digital download; streaming	Speedstar Records	
South Korea	November 14, 2025	Digital download; streaming	J-Box Entertainment	
