= Mad Hope =

- Logo used for the song and associated tour

Promotional single by Gen Hoshino featuring Louis Cole, Sam Gendel, and Sam Wilkes

from the album Gen and the EP Lighthouse
- Language: Japanese; English
- Released: May 14, 2025
- Genre: Fusion pop
- Length: 3:28 (full); 0:35 (short)
- Label: Speedstar
- Songwriters: Gen Hoshino; Louis Cole
- Producer: Gen Hoshino

Music video
- "Mad Hope" on YouTube

"Mad Hope" (Hepburn: Maddo Hōpu) is a song by the Japanese singer-songwriter Gen Hoshino featuring American instrumentalists Louis Cole, Sam Gendel, and Sam Wilkes. Written by Hoshino and Cole, it was produced and recorded over three years. Hoshino programmed different parts in Japan and sent these for the musicians to record in America. The song was first released as a 30-second short version on Hoshino's second EP, Lighthouse, in 2023. Afterwards, Hoshino visited Cole in Los Angeles to complete a full-length version, which was released on his sixth studio album, Gen, in 2025. Musically, it is a fusion pop song with elements of Cole, Gendel, and Wilkes' jazz styles, drawing from spiritual jazz, fusion jazz, and avant garde music. The composition is accompanied by Hoshino's poetry-like lyrics, which consists of singular words presented without meaning.

"Mad Hope" was issued to Japanese radio alongside the release of Gen on May 14, 2025. Japanese internet content creator ARuFa directed its first-person music video, which was released on July 24, 2025. The song was the namesake for Gen's headlining tour, where it was also performed. Several Japanese music critics found the collaborative effort of Hoshino and the featuring artists to be surprising or fresh. Commercially, the song peaked at number 37 on the Japan Hot 100.

== Background and production ==
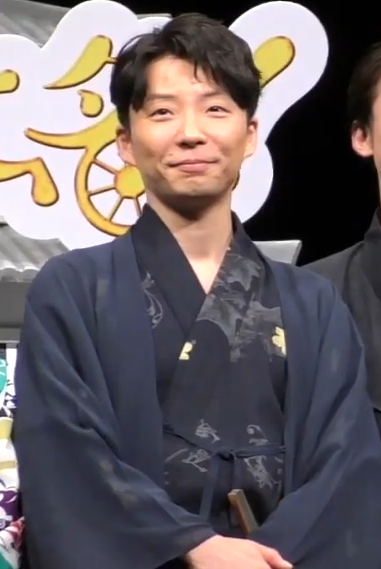
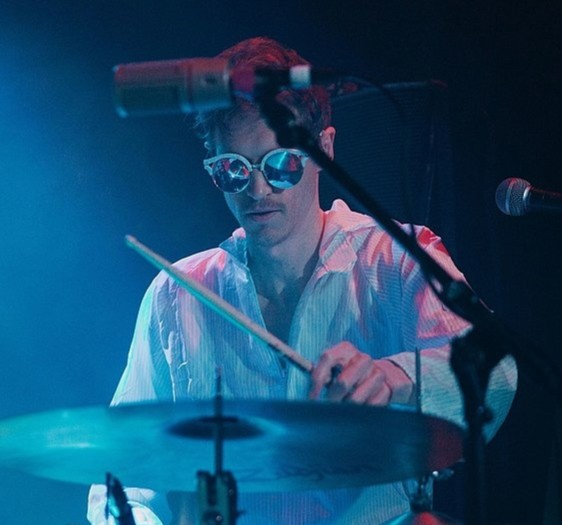
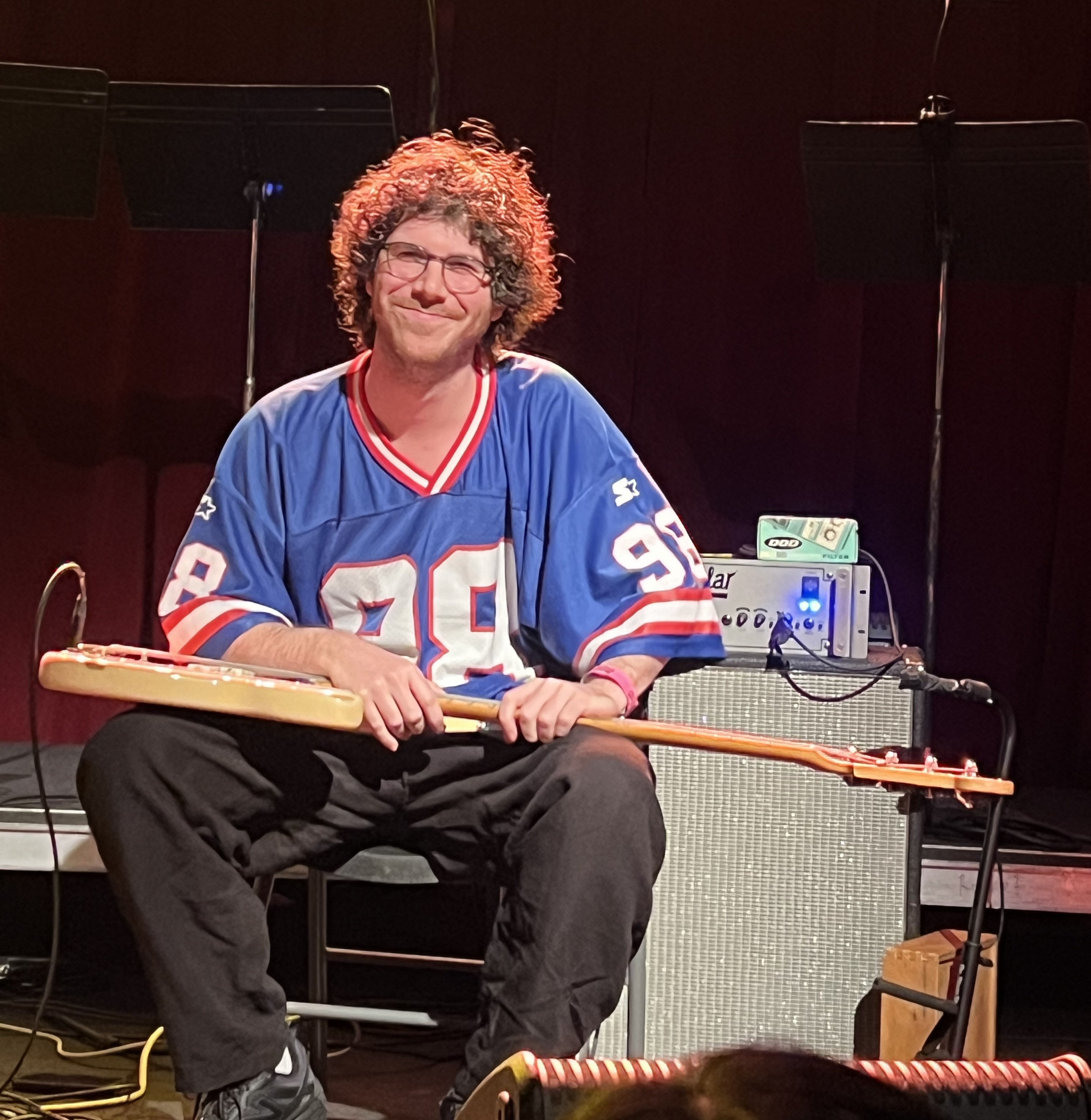
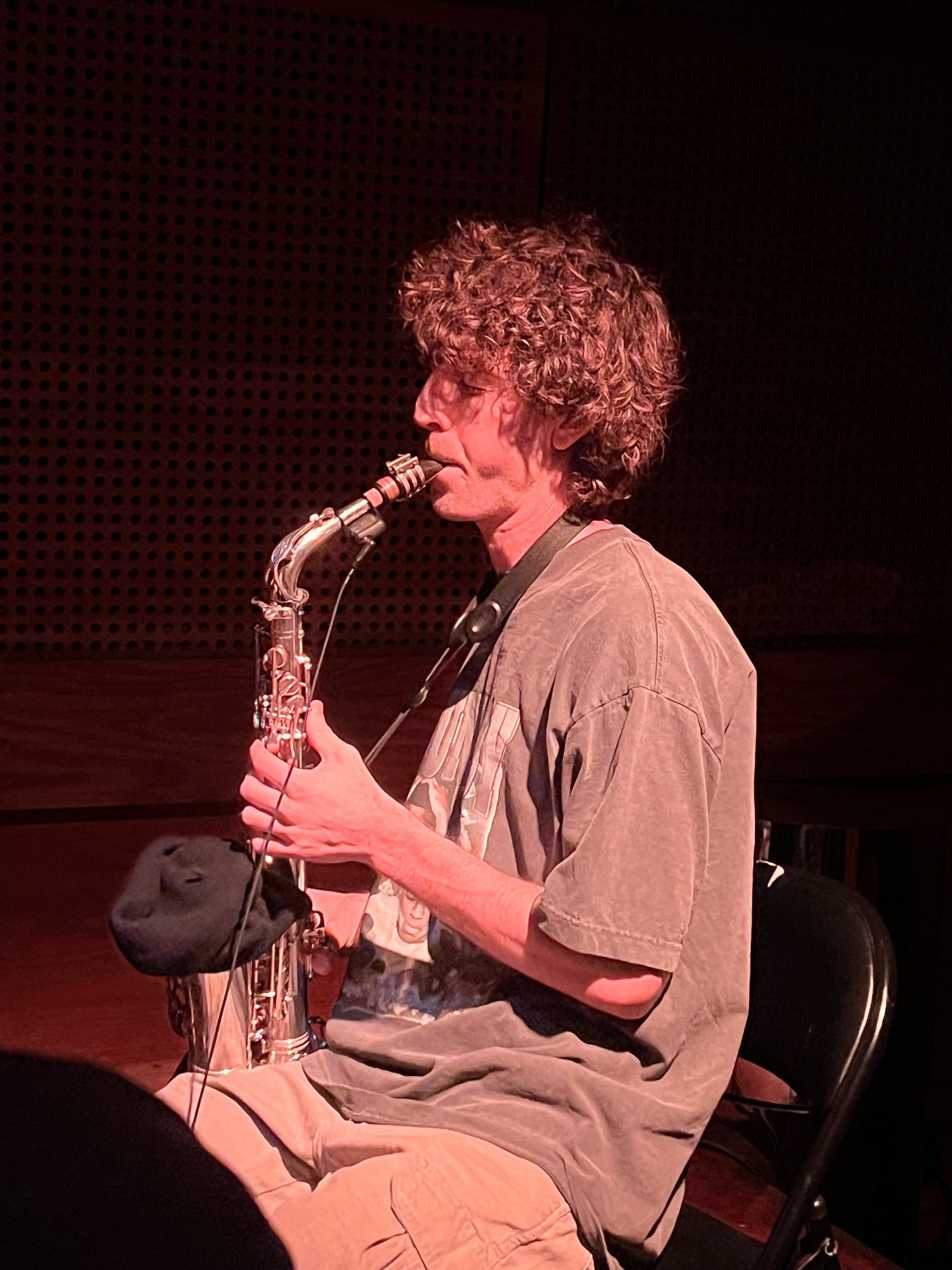
"Mad Hope" is a collaboration between (clockwise from top left) Gen Hoshino, Louis Cole, Sam Gendel, and Sam Wilkes.

Gen Hoshino is a Japanese singer-songwriter, and multi-instrumentalist Louis Cole, saxophonist Sam Gendel, and bassist Sam Wilkes are American musicians active in the Los Angeles jazz scene. Since his debut album, Baka no Uta (2010), Hoshino had purposely refrained from including featuring artists in his works, but changed his perspective after befriending artists including the British indie pop band Superorganism. His works with Superorganism and other artists spawned an EP, Same Thing (2019), and reignited his passion for music after a burnout he experienced upon the success of his fifth album, Pop Virus (2018). Excited by the prospect of collaborations, Hoshino sought out new artists, including Cole.

Hoshino and Cole befriended each other upon the latter's visit to Japan shortly before the COVID-19 pandemic. In a 2021 interview, Hoshino said he was well-acquainted with Cole and that they frequently exchanged via e-mail. A short while after the pandemic cleared, Hoshino and Cole began working on "Mad Hope" over a three-year period. Gendel and Wilkes also became involved with the project, as did Japanese guitarist Ryosuke Nagaoka, who played electric guitar and arranged the background vocals with Hoshino. Hoshino would independently write various beats and synthesizer parts using digital audio workstations and send it to the respective musician in America, asking them to either play it faithfully or rearrange it as they wished. Hoshino would then pick his favorite takes and edit these to create the song.

The first finished arrangement of "Mad Hope" was a 35 second-long short version, which was used as the opening theme to Hoshino and comedian Masayasu Wakabayashi's Netflix talk show Lighthouse (2023). Hoshino also write five other songs as ending themes to the show; together with "Mad Hope", these were released on his second EP, also titled Lighthouse, in September 2023. This version featured Cole on drums, Wilkes on electric bass, Gendel on alto sax, and Nagaoka on guitar and background vocals. Hoshino performed lead vocals and various synthesizers: the Prophet-5, Yamaha DX7, Casio CZ-1, and Roland Jupiter-6.

Hoshino originally planned his sixth studio album with Mad Hope as its working title. Although the album was later renamed Gen, Hoshino still considered the song central to the record. After Lighthouse, work on "Mad Hope" continued alongside the album, and the length of the song was extended to 3 minutes and 28 seconds. Hoshino personally traveled to Cole's home in Los Angeles to record drums for the new length. For the full version, Cole also recorded lead and background vocals and Hoshino played the Oberheim OB-Xa and Casio CZ-101 synthesizers, but removed the Jupiter-6. Daniel Crawford, an LA-based jazz pianist, joined the recording with additional CZ-101 and bass performance. The full version of "Mad Hope" was released as the second track on Gen in May 2025. Another track on the album, "Glitch", samples a drum performance originally released by Cole to YouTube in 2010.

== Composition ==
"Mad Hope" features musical elements of Cole, Wilkes, and Gendel's modern jazz and fusion styles, and draws from genres such as spiritual jazz and jazz fusion. Shōichi Miyake for Musica described the song as fusion pop. Hoshino and Cole both perform lead vocals, blending pop music with avant-garde and making "Mad Hope" one of several multilingual tracks on Gen. Hoshino's lyrics consist of singular words lined consecutively without sentence structure, evoking a spiritual atmosphere akin to Dadaist poetry according to NiEW Media's Imdkm, who felt that Hoshino was "playing around" with words without regard for meaning. In an interview with Switch magazine, Hoshino affirmed that the lyrics of "Mad Hope" contains no message, but hoped listeners would insert their own meaning.

== Promotion and reception ==
At midnight on May 14, 2025, alongside the release of Gen, "Mad Hope" was issued to Japanese radio. Radio station surveyor Plantech reported that it was the second most-aired song of the week, behind only fellow Gen track "Star"; in total, Hoshino songs occupied eight spots in the top two-hundred. "Mad Hope" charted two weeks on Billboard Japan Hot 100, where it peaked at number 37 during its debut week on May 21, 2025.

Suzie Suzuki, a critic for Yahoo! Japan News, considered "Mad Hope" an highlight off the Gen album. Several critics found interest in the collaborative efforts of Hoshino, Cole, Wilkes, and Gendel. (Note: Attributed to Shōichi Miyake for Musica, Tomonori Shiba for Yahoo! Japan News, and Tomoyuki Mori for Real Sound.) Tomonori Shiba, also writing for Yahoo, described the collaborators as a "fresh ensemble", and music critic Yoshiaki Takahashi thought Cole and Hoshino constituted one of the more tightly knit partnerships on the album. Real Sound's Tomoyuki Mori praised the song: he found the combination of Hoshino and Cole's pop and avant garde vocals "delightful[ly] ... surprising", and called the progression unpredictable: "but [the progression] doesn't feel like its been connected by forced. It pushes forward, but its warmth doesn't leave anyone behind." Bass Magazine's Miku Jimbo wrote that Wilkes' short bass lines created a "satisfying" groove paired with the rhythm of Cole's drums. Imdkm for NiEW Media considered Cole's "junky" and high-intensity playing a surprising mixture with Japanese pop music. Fumiako Amano for Rockin'On Japan highlighted "Mad Hope" in his review of Lighthouse from 2023, in which he voiced excitement towards a full version.

== Music video ==
A music video for the song, directed by Japanese internet content creator ARuFa, was premiered to YouTube on July 24, 2025. Hoshino and ARuFa previously became acquainted after appearing on each other's radio programs; upon the completion of Gen, Hoshino directly reached out to ARuFa about directing the video. The video was partly filmed using ARuFa's personal smartphone with a broken screen, which he has also used to record his own videos.

The video, which Billboard Japan writers described as "bizarre" and "DIY", is shot from a first-person perspective. It depicts the protagonist as they run around various locations while using everyday objects to change the environments. The character finds the outline of a ship's wheel-like shape in their notebook and acquires the shape in reality; they place it onto a fitting shape on a manhole and looks through a keyhole, before crawling towards light in the darkness. Subsequently, they begin floating through ceilings into different rooms, where Hoshino can be seen interacting with objects used throughout the video. The video ends with the character floating out of the building, revealing a colorful residential area.

== Live performances ==
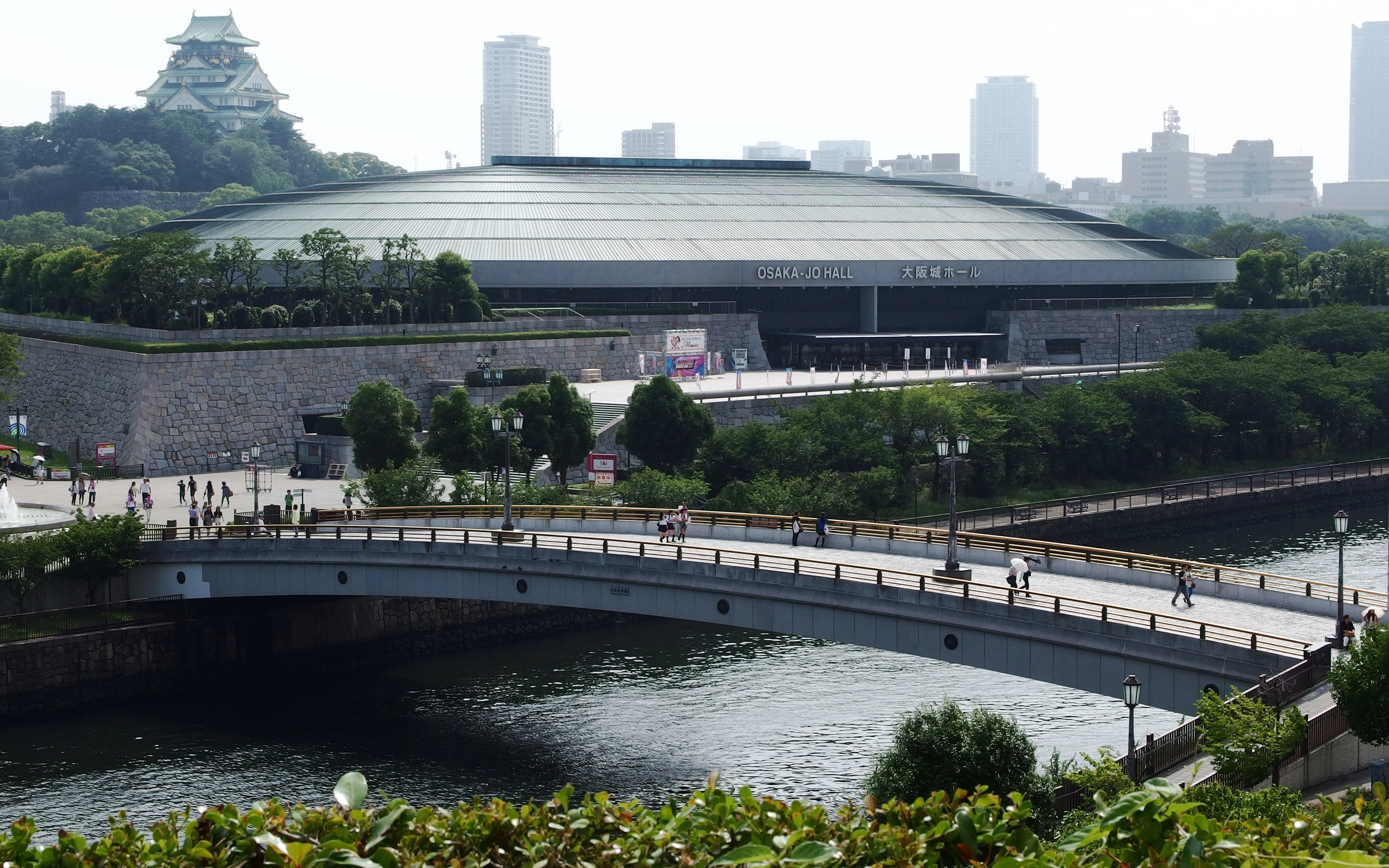
The headlining tour for Gen was named after "Mad Hope". A performance of the song, filmed at the Osaka Jo Hall (pictured 2014), was released to YouTube.

On February 20, 2020, prior to the announcement of Gen's title and track listing, Hoshino unveiled the album's accompanying concert tour, Gen Hoshino Presents Mad Hope, named after the song with 14 shows throughout Japan. It was later expanded with an accompanying Asia Tour, which would visit Taiwan and South Korea. In Japan shows of the tour, "Mad Hope" was played as the fourteenth song on the setlist and transitioned into "Star". The song opened with dazzling show lights and smoke covering the stage. During its performance, Hoshino engaged in a guitar solo stand-off with band leader Nagaoka. Strings and horn sections were added onto the arrangement; Shun Ishiwaka played the drum part and Satoru Takeshima performed an interpretation of Gendel's alto sax. Tomoyuki Mori, reporting for The First Times about the concert at the Saitama Super Arena, considered "Mad Hope" a "thrill" of the show. A video of the song's performance during the Japan tour, filmed at the Osaka Jo Hall, was released to YouTube on August 22, 2025.

== Personnel ==
=== Song ===
The following credits refer to the album version and are adapted from Gen on Hoshino's official website.

- Gen Hoshino – vocals, background vocals, Prophet-5, Yamaha DX7, Oberheim OB-Xa, Casio CZ-101, Casio CZ-1, music, lyrics, arrangement, arrangement of background vocals, programming, production, and recording
- Louis Cole – vocals, background vocals, drums, music, lyrics, arrangement of background vocals, and recording
- Sam Wilkes – electric bass and recording
- Sam Gendel – alto sax and recording
- Daniel Crawford – Oberheim OB-Xa and additional bass
- Ryosuke Nagaoka – electric guitar and arrangement of background vocals
- Shu Saida – recording
- Shojiro Watanabe – mixing
- Takahiro Uchida – mastering

The credits differ on the short version from Lighthouse. On the Lighthouse version, Cole is not credited as a songwriter nor arranger; background vocals are performed by Hoshino and Nagaoka only; the Oberheim OB-Xa and Casio CZ-101 are not included, but the Roland Jupiter-6 is; recording is credited to Shu Saida only; and Crawford is not present.

=== Music video ===
Visual credits are adapted from the YouTube video description.

- Burg Hamburg Burg Inc. – production
- ARuFa – director, editor
- Go Takakusagi – hair and make-up
- Dai Ishii – stylist
- Shuto Sugiyama – stylist assistant
- Haruto Naoi – stylist assistant
- Hitoshi Sugai – post-production coordinator
- Mai Kikuchi – online editor and colorist
- Go Ozawa – online assistant
- Keisuke Nakata – mixer

== Charts ==
Weekly chart performance for "Mad Hope"
Chart (2025)	Peak position
Japan (Billboard Japan Hot 100)	37
Japan Radio Chart (Plantech)	2

== Release history ==
Release date and format for "Mad Hope"
Region	Date	Format(s)	Ref.
Japan	May 14, 2025	Radio airplay	
