= Odd Couple (song) =

2023 song by Gen Hoshino

Song by Gen Hoshino
- Language: Japanese
- A-side: "Why"; "Life"
- B-side: "Beyond the Sequence" (double B-side)
- Released: December 27, 2023
- Length: 3:12
- Label: Speedstar
- Songwriter: Gen Hoshino
- Producer: Gen Hoshino

Audio
- "Odd Couple" on YouTube

"Odd Couple" (Japanese: おともだち, Hepburn: O tomodachi; lit. "Friends") (Japanese pronunciation: [otomodatɕi]) is a song by Japanese singer-songwriter and musician Gen Hoshino, released as a B-side on his double A-side single "Why" / "Life" (2023). Offered to create a theme song for comedy duo Audrey's live performance at the Tokyo Dome, Hoshino wrote and produced "Odd Couple" to represent the friendship of duo members Masayasu Wakabayashi and Toshiaki Kasuga, with the song's lyrics referencing Audrey throughout a "weird" composition.

"Odd Couple" was first unveiled on Audrey's All Night Nippon program on December 3, 2023, which was later re-broadcast via Radiko radio stations the following week. As a part of the "Why" / "Life" single, it reached No. 70 on the Billboard Japan Top Download Songs chart and received airplay on regional radio stations in southern Japan.

== Writing and development ==
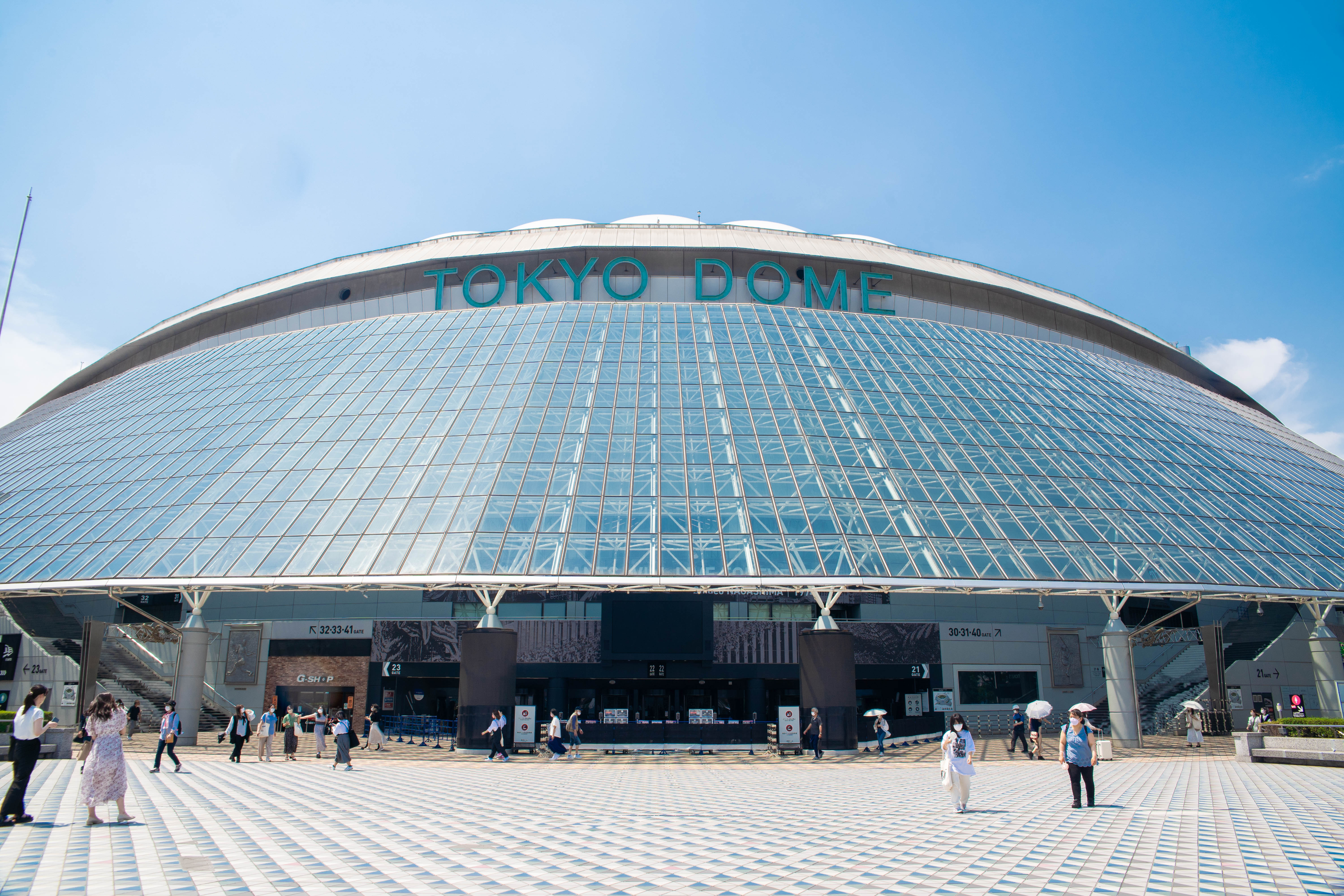
"Odd Couple" was written for a performance by the comedy duo Audrey at the Tokyo Dome (pictured).

In March 2023, the comedy duo Audrey announced that they would perform at the Tokyo Dome. Guest appearing on the duo's All Night Nippon radio program in September, Gen Hoshino was offered by the group to write the performance's theme song, which he reportedly enthusiastically accepted on the spot. In writing, Hoshino wished to create a theme song that would feel as Audrey in song. After trying to materialize his personal impression of the duo, Hoshino summarized Audrey in one word as "crazy" (イカれる, ikareru); "poppy" and simultaneously "anarchy". Hoshino first programmed a demo of the song on his own, before showing it to his band members and then recording it on the fly. He likened this production process to his EP Lighthouse (2023), consisting of songs he had written for the talk show of the same name, co-hosted by Hoshino with Audrey's Wakabayashi.

Shortly before beginning writing, Hoshino went for lunch with Wakabayashi, where he heard about him and Kasuga talking for long periods of time on phone when they were students, in a way similar to their present radio work; the story inspired Hoshino to make the theme song representative of the duo's friendship and history, rather than of the Tokyo Dome event specifically. Hoshino wrote "Odd Couple" wishing to showcase Wakabayashi and Kasuga's closeness while still remaining accessible in showcasing friendship to listeners unfamiliar with the group. He found lyrical inspiration in direct interactions with the duo, and would also note his conversations on Lighthouse as influential to some degree, though they did not converse about Audrey.

Musically, Hoshino began by writing the song's intro, which he described as "weird", with key changes in unexpected locations and without proper connection to the chorus. He thought the arrangement would fit Audrey, whose image he described as "bright and fun, but with a negative and mad side." "Odd Couple" was written, arranged, and produced by Hoshino, who also provided vocals, tambourine, and synthesizer. 3 minutes and 12 seconds long, it features Noriyasu Kawamura on drums, Jungo Miura on electric bass, Hirotaka Sakurada on Rhodes piano, and Ryosuke Nagaoka on electric guitar. The song was mixed by Shojiro Watanabe at Victor Studio and mastered by Takahiro Uchida at Flair Mastering Works, with recording credited to Hoshino, Watanabe, and Shu Saida. Satoshi Goto is named for assistance.

== Promotion and release ==
"Odd Couple" was first unveiled on-air on Audrey's All Night Nippon on December 3, 2023, with a message from Hoshino explaining its meaning. Audrey had not been showed the song before the broadcast. Within a week of the unveiling, it was announced that the episode would be re-broadcast via Radiko radio stations. Earlier on November 10, Hoshino had announced that he would release a new double A-side single with the song "Life" (2023) to feature as one of the lead tracks. Two days after the radio broadcast, Hoshino announced "Odd Couple" and UCC Coffee commercial song "Beyond the Sequence" as the single's B-sides, with Spy × Family Code: White ending theme "Why" to be the other A-side. "Why" / "Life" was released on December 27, 2023. As a part of the single, "Odd Couple" observed moderate success in digital sales, reaching No. 70 on Billboard Japan's Top Download Songs chart, and received airplay on regional radio stations such as FM Toyama, FM San-in (Tottori and Shimane), and FM Gifu.

== Personnel ==
Credits adapted from Hoshino's website.

- Gen Hoshino – songwriting, arrangement, vocals, background vocals, tambourine, synthesizer, producer, recording
- Noriyasu Kawamura – drums
- Jungo Miura – electric bass
- Hirotaka Sakurada – Rhodes piano
- Ryosuke Nagaoka – electric guitar, background vocals, background vocals arrangement
- Shojiro Watanabe – mixing, recording
- Takahiro Uchida – mastering
- Shu Saida – recording
- Satoshi Goto – assistance

== Charts ==
Weekly chart performance for "Odd Couple" (2024)
Chart (2024)	Peak position
Japanese Top Download Songs (Billboard Japan)	70
