= Fabiano do Nascimento =

Brazilian guitarist and composer

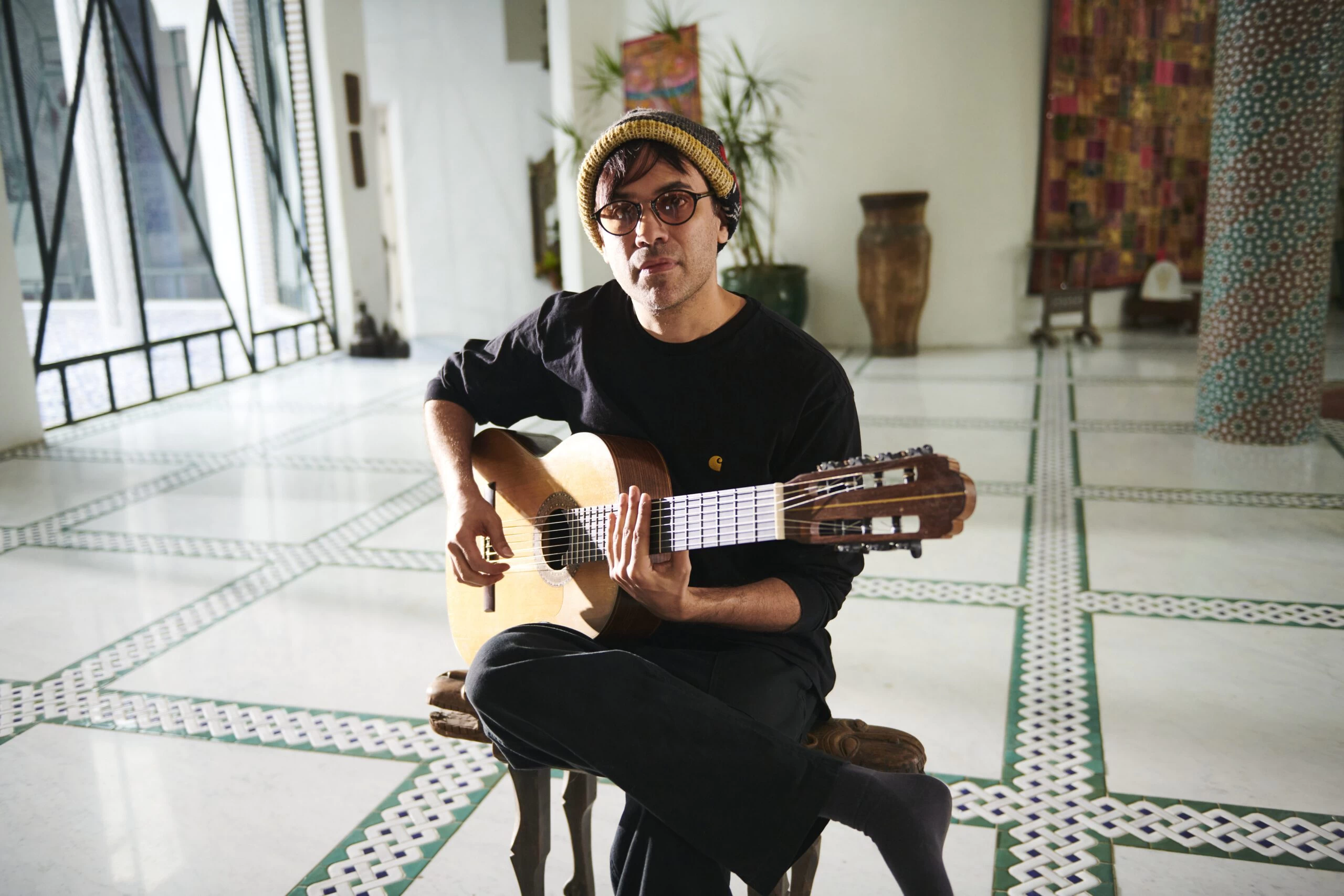
- Fabiano do Nascimento

Background information
- Origin: Rio de Janeiro, Brazil
- Genres: Afro-samba, folk music, choro, jazz, experimental music, electronica
- Years active: 2011–present
- Labels: Leaving Records, Far Out Recordings, Rings, Real World Records, Now-Again Records
- Website: fabianomusic.com

Fabiano do Nascimento is a Brazilian-American guitarist, composer, producer, and arranger based in Los Angeles and Tokyo. He performs on various multi-string and multi-tuning guitars.

Do Nascimento's compositions incorporate traditions of Afro-samba, folkloric music, and choro, blended with elements of jazz, experimental music, and electronica. He utilizes alternately strung and tuned guitars, including seven-string, ten-string, Oktav, and baritone models. He has collaborated with musicians such as Mitski, Sam Gendel, UAKTI, E Ruscha V, and U-Zhaan.

He has released sixteen albums, including works for Leaving Records, Now-Again Records, Real World Records, and Far Out Recordings. His music has been reviewed by Pitchfork, Songlines, Jazzwise, and PopMatters. In 2026, The Guardian designated his collaborative album with the Vittor Santos Orquestra, Vila, as "Global Album of the Month." He also performed for NPR's Tiny Desk concert series in 2020.

== History ==
Do Nascimento was born into a musical family in Rio de Janeiro. He is the great-grandson of the Brazilian saxophonist Ladário Teixeira.

Do Nascimento studied classical piano before beginning guitar studies at age 10 under his uncle, the Rio de Janeiro bassist and composer Lucio Nascimento. In 2001, he moved to Los Angeles, California. In 2005, he formed the Latin jazz group Triorganico with Pablo Calogero and Tiki Pasillas. He has since participated in various projects and collaborated with artists including Airto Moreira, Arthur Verocai, Sam Gendel, Aloe Blacc, and Daniel Santiago.

== Discography ==
Year	Title	Label	Notes
2011	Leaf And Root	Swingbros Co.	with Sumiko Fukatsu
2015	Dança Dos Tempos	Now-Again Records	with Airto Moreira
2017	Tempo Dos Mestres	Now-Again Records	
2020	Prelúdio	Now-Again Records	
2021	Ykytu	Now-Again Records	
2022	Rio Bonito	Rings	with Itiberê Zwarg Collective
2023	Das Nuvens	Leaving Records	
2023	Mundo Solo	Far Out Recordings	
2023	Lendas	Now-Again Records	featuring Arthur Verocai
2024	The Room	Real World Records	with Sam Gendel
2024	Olhos D’água	Bar Buenos Aires	with Daniel Santiago
2024	Harmônicos	Rings	with Shin Sasakubo
2025	Cavejaz	Leaving Records	with Paulo Santos of UAKTI
2025	Solstice Concert	Leaving Records	
2026	Vila	Far Out Recordings	with Vittor Santos Orquestra
2026	Aquáticos	Music From Memory	with E Ruscha V
