= Saho Terao =

Japanese singer-songwriter and essayist (born 1981)

- 寺尾紗穂
- Born: November 7, 1981 (age 44); Tokyo, Japan
- Occupations: Singer; songwriter; essayist
- Musical career
- Genres: J-pop
- Years active: 2006–present
- Website: sahoterao.com

Saho Terao (寺尾紗穂, Terao Saho; born November 7, 1981) is a Japanese singer-songwriter and essayist.

Terao debuted in 2007 and has been musically active in a variety of fields, including live performances, commercial music, providing theme songs for films directed by Nobuhiko Obayashi and Momoko Ando, and performing with the band Fuyu ni Wakarete.

In addition to writing serialized columns in magazines, newspapers, and web blogs, Terao has edited and published numerous essay collections and non-fiction books.

== Biography ==
Terao was born on November 7, 1981, in Tokyo, Japan. Terao's father, Jirō Terao, was a bassist for the band Sugar Babe alongside Tatsuro Yamashita and Taeko Ōnuki. After the band disbanded, he worked as a subtitle translator for French films. Terao began piano lessons in early childhood and vocal training in her second year of junior high school. During junior high and high school, she wrote lyrics and composed music in a musical theater club.

Terao graduated from Toho Girls' Junior and Senior High School and studied Chinese Literature at Tokyo Metropolitan University. In 2007, Terao received a master's degree in Interdisciplinary Cultural Studies from the University of Tokyo.

== Works ==
=== Discography ===
==== Studio albums ====
| Title | Release Date |
|---|---|
| 御身 onmi | April 4, 2007 |
| 風はびゅうびゅう | May 14, 2008 |
| 愛の秘密 | April 22, 2009 |
| 残照 | June 23, 2010 |
| 青い夜のさよなら | June 6, 2012 |
| 楕円の夢 | March 18, 2015 |
| たよりないもののために | June 21, 2017 |
| 北へ向かう | March 4, 2020 |
| 余白のメロディ | June 22, 2022 |
| しゅー・しゃいん | September 18, 2024 |
| わたしの好きな労働歌 | June 25, 2025 |

=== Bibliography ===
==== Books ====
| Title | Year Published |
|---|---|
| 評伝 川島芳子 – 男装のエトランゼ | 2008 |
| 愛し、日々 | 2014 |
| 原発労働者 | 2015 |
| 南洋と私 | 2015 |
| あのころのパラオをさがして – 日本統治下の南洋を生きた人々 | 2017 |
| 彗星の孤独 | 2018 |
| 天使日記 | 2021 |
| 日本人が移民だったころ | 2023 |
| 戦前音楽探訪 | 2025 |
