= The Full-Time Wife Escapist =

Japanese manga series

- Cover of the first volume

逃げるは恥だが役に立つ (Nigeru wa Haji da ga Yaku ni Tatsu)
- Genre: Romance
- Manga
- Written by: Tsunami Umino
- Published by: Kodansha
- English publisher: Kodansha Comics
- Magazine: Kiss
- Original run: November 9, 2012 – April 13, 2020
- Volumes: 11
- Television drama
- Directed by: Fuminori Kaneko
- Produced by: Yasuharu Ishii; Nobuhiro Doi
- Written by: Akiko Nogi
- Music by: Kenichiro Suehiro; MAYUKO
- Licensed by: Viki
- Original network: TBS
- Original run: October 11, 2016 – December 20, 2016
- Episodes: 11

The Full-Time Wife Escapist (逃げるは恥だが役に立つ, Nigeru wa Haji da ga Yaku ni Tatsu; lit. Running away is shameful, but useful) is a Japanese romance josei manga series written and illustrated by Tsunami Umino. The original title is from a Hungarian proverb szégyen a futás, de hasznos, Hungarian pronunciation: [ˈse̝ːɟɛnɒ ˌfutɑ̈ːʃ dɛ ˈhɒsnoʃ]. It was published by Kodansha, with serialization in Kiss magazine since November 9, 2012 and eleven volumes released across the whole series timeframe.

The series later got a live-action adaptation that began airing on TBS in October 2016, with Yui Aragaki and Gen Hoshino as the leads. Viki has licensed the series in North America. Aragaki and Hoshino, the leads, would go on to marry in real life.

== Characters ==
Mikuri Moriyama (森山 みくり, Moriyama Mikuri)
Portrayed by: Yui Aragaki.
A graduate student, 25 years old, who was recently fired from her temporary job.
Mikuri studied psychology in graduate school and is a licensed clinical psychologist, and often internally psycho-analyzes Hiramasa. After losing her temp job, she is given the chance to become a housekeeper at Hiramasa's home, desperate for any source of income. After learning that her parents are about to move to the countryside as her father retires, she enters a contract marriage with Hiramasa, allowing her a place to live and a stable source of employment.
Hiramasa Tsuzaki (津崎 平匡, Tsuzaki Hiramasa)
Portrayed by: Gen Hoshino.
A salaryman, 36, who is one of the top workers in his company.
Despite being 36, he is still a virgin and calls himself a "professional bachelor." He enters a contract common-law marriage with Mikuri because he thinks it will be useful to have someone live with him who can take care of him if need be.
Fairly quickly after marrying Mikuri, he begins to have feelings and desires for her, which he tries to suppress. Mikuri speculates that Hiramasa struggles with hypervigilant narcissism, as he completely avoids any situation that may interrupt his way of life or self image.
Ryota Kazami (風見涼太, Kazami Ryota)
Portrayed by: Ryohei Otani.
Hiramasa's coworker, 32.
He often wonders if marriage is a good thing, and breaks up with his girlfriend in the first volume after she wants marriage and he does not. He later moves into the same neighborhood as Mikuri's aunt Yuri.
Yuri Tsuchiya (土屋百合, Tsuchiya Yuri)
Portrayed by: Yuriko Ishida.
Mikuri's 52-year-old aunt who insists Mikuri calls her by her first name and not as "Aunt." She is single and has never married, and mentions that she made it to menopause a virgin.
Yuri is shown to be a career woman with a good amount of wealth, but laments that she should have gotten married when she was younger even if it would end in divorce. She sees Kazami break up with his girlfriend at the restaurant and holds resentment towards him.
Numata (沼田, Numata)
Portrayed by: Arata Furuta.
Hiramasa's gay coworker who socializes with him and Kazami.
When he is first invited to Hiramasa and Mikuri's apartment, he shows his skills as a great cook. He catches on early that Hiramasa and Mikuri are not a real couple, but fantasizes that Hiramasa married Mikuri to hide that he is in a relationship with Kazami, which is untrue.
Hideshi Hino (日野秀司, Hino Hideshi)
Portrayed by: Takashi Fujii.
Another of Hiramasa's coworkers, he is a typical married man with kids.

== Volumes ==
No.	Original release date	Original ISBN	English release date	English ISBN
1	June 13, 2013	978-4-06-340911-6	February 28, 2017	978-1-68-233479-9
2	October 11, 2013	978-4-06-340920-8	April 25, 2017	978-1-68-233589-5
3	February 13, 2014	978-4-06-340924-6	May 23, 2017	978-1-68-233590-1
4	October 10, 2014	978-4-06-340936-9	July 11, 2017	978-1-68-233591-8
5	April 13, 2015	978-4-06-340954-3	August 8, 2017	978-1-68-233600-7
6	October 25, 2015	978-4-06-340968-0	November 7, 2017	978-1-68-233964-0
7	June 13, 2016	978-4-06-340984-0	December 5, 2017	978-1-64-212052-3
8	October 13, 2016	978-4-06-340998-7	December 26, 2017	978-1-64-212084-4
9	March 13, 2017	978-4-06-398013-4 (regular edition); 978-4-06-362356-7 (special edition)	January 30, 2018	978-1-64-212109-4
10	August 9, 2019	978-4-06-516720-5	December 27, 2022	978-1-68-491559-0
11	April 13, 2020	978-4-06-519231-3	February 21, 2023	978-1-68-491660-3

== Reception ==
Volume 5 reached the 47th place on the weekly Oricon manga charts and, as of April 19, 2015, had sold 20,288 copies.

The series won the award for Best Shōjo Manga at the 39th Kodansha Manga Awards.

The television drama was very popular and also raised discussion on traditional views and values on marriage in Japan. The ending theme Koi by Gen Hoshino featuring the cast dancing the Koi Dance ("love dance") became a craze in Japan. As of 2023, the music video for the song currently has over 280 million views on YouTube.
