= Lighthouse (talk show) =

Japanese talk show hosted by Gen Hoshino and Masayasu Wakabayashi

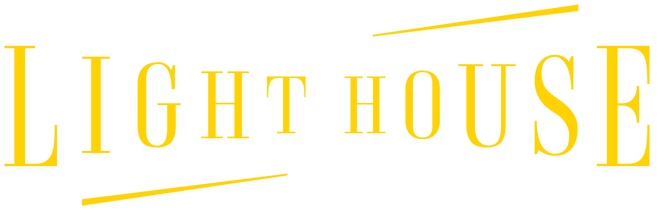
- Genre: Variety talk show
- Directed by: Nobuyuki Sakuma; Masanori Ueno
- Presented by: Gen Hoshino; Masayasu Wakabayashi
- Theme music composer: Gen Hoshino
- Opening theme: "Mad Hope" (feat. Louis Cole and Sam Gendel)
- Ending theme: Tracks #1-5 from the EP Lighthouse See list: "Lighthouse"; "Responder"; "Outcast"; "Orange" (feat. Masayasu Wakabayashi); "Dancing Reluctantly"
- Country of origin: Japan
- Original language: Japanese
- No. of seasons: 1
- No. of episodes: 6

Production
- Executive producer: Shinichi Takahashi
- Producers: Nobuyuki Sakuma; Yōko Usui; Takeshi Arita
- Running time: 30–38 minutes
- Production company: D:Complex

Original release
- Network: Netflix
- Release: August 22, 2023

Lighthouse (Note: Raitohausu: Nayameru Futari, Rokka Getsu no Taiwa (「LIGHTHOUSE」〜悩める2人、6ヶ月の対話〜; lit. Lighthouse: 2 Worried People, 6 Months of Discussions)) (Japanese pronunciation: [ɾaitohaꜜɯsɯ]) is a Japanese variety talk show hosted by musician Gen Hoshino and comedian Masayasu Wakabayashi. The series sees Hoshino and Wakabayashi meeting monthly at different locations for half a year, discussing worries with aid from journals of their thoughts. Hoshino wrote six songs based on the talk show, which are used as opening and ending themes.

The concept for the series was conceived by television producer Nobuyuki Sakuma after watching Hoshino guest star on Wakabayashi's variety show Achikochi Audrey. Wishing to showcase the hosts evolution through episodes to almost mimick Japanese television drama, Sakuma conceived of Gen Hoshino and Masayasu Wakabayashi's One Year, similar to the final product but spanning a year's period. After changing the filming period to half a year due to scheduling constraints, Sakuma renamed the show to Lighthouse, also attaching this name to Hoshino and Wakabayashi's duo. Production began in October 2022, and featured a focus on preserving entertainment value via comedy throughout the heavier subjects.

Lighthouse was released worldwide via Netflix on August 22, 2023, with six episodes. It saw positive response from Japanese critics, who praised its style, theming, and Hoshino and Wakabayashi as presenters. Western reviewers commented that the show was potentially more tailored towards Japanese audiences. Hoshino's theme songs saw release as an extended play (EP) under the same title on September 8, which peaked at No. 6 on the Billboard Japan Hot Albums chart.

== Format ==
Hoshino (left) and Wakabayashi (right) at an Asagaya café in Lighthouse's first episode

Lighthouse is a talk variety show with comedy themes, hosted by musician and actor Gen Hoshino and comedian and television presenter Masayasu Wakabayashi. The show sees Hoshino and Wakabayashi meeting roughly once a month for half a year, discussing worries. The 1-Line Diaries, (Note: 1-Line Diary (1行日記, Ikkō Nikki)) short notes written by the hosts in between episodes based on their present thoughts, serve to aid the conversations. The series features a change of location every episode, such as to a café, a hotel penthouse, or live stage featuring live viewers. Episodes end with a song by Hoshino, inspired by the conversations of the song's respective episode.

== Production ==
=== Development ===
Hoshino and Wakabayashi had collaborated on several works prior to Lighthouse, spanning back to 2011. In June 2021, Hoshino guest appeared on Wakabayashi's variety show Achikochi Audrey, where they discussed what QJWeb described as their "ugly" or "murky" emotions. Hoshino's guest appearance inspired Lighthouse series director and producer Nobuyuki Sakuma, who was working on Achikochi Audrey at that time, to create a show hosted by the two. He was impressed by their chemistry and thought that the duo's "synchronized" conversations resonated with the audience, which would make such a talk show a "masterpiece" with the qualities to be both binge-watchable and rewatchable.

Inspired by stand-up performances from American comedians such as Aziz Ansari, Sakuma wanted the series to showcase the presenters evolution throughout episodes, which would give it a style similar to Japanese drama. Having observed that Hoshino made comments regarding the set in his Achikochi Audrey appearance, Sakuma planned a swap of location every episode to change the emotions and contents of Hoshino and Wakabayashi's conversations. The original idea of the show was titled Gen Hoshino and Masayasu Wakabayashi's One Year, (Note: Gen Hoshino to Masayasu Wakabayashi no One Year (星野源と若林正恭のONE YEAR, Hoshino Gen to Wakabayashi Masayasu no One Year; lit. Gen Hoshino and Masayasu Wakabayashi's One Year)) and would feature a similar format to the final product but instead spanning a full year. However, a one-year recording period proved too timely in regards to scheduling and translation, especially since all episodes were to receive a same-day release, and it was shortened to six months. It was renamed to Lighthouse, a name Sakuma had come up with for the duo of Hoshino and Wakabayashi. Sakuma had learnt the English word for lighthouse through short stories by Ray Bradbury and again saw the word in the title of a play he had viewed around the time of writing the talk show's proposal. He subsequently recalled the 2019 film The Lighthouse and then thought that the word was a perfect name for the duo, symbolizing Hoshino and Wakabayashi as lighthouses that shine light for many people whilst their own footsteps remain dark.

=== Filming and editing ===
Under the production company D:Complex, filming for Lighthouse began in October 2022. Sakuma thought that this period (late 2022), when the coronavirus pandemic began to calm, was important for Hoshino and Wakabayashi as creators, and would thus make it easier for them to open up on the show. It was filmed with no strict plans, as the presenters were put in control of what to discuss. Though Hoshino had been interested in the show since its proposal, by the time of filming for the first episode, both he and Wakabayashi were still unsure of what the program would become; Wakabayashi commented that a talk show was unlike most other Netflix programming.

Since he assumed the show would cover heavy subjects, Sakuma wanted to preserve its entertainment value through comedy. Sakuma was the staff member located closest to the presenters during filming, which he commented put him in charge of important mood making. He said that when he laughs, the atmosphere becomes comic, but if the seriousness reaches him it would become "truly heavy." Though Sakuma believed that Hoshino and Wakabayashi's conversations alone would make the show a hit, he prepared the 1-Line Diary as a single quality insurance. Rather than long essays, he imagined that messages with a single punchline would reach more people.

When filming concluded, Sakuma found the footage "outstanding", but wanted to use it carefully in editing to prevent Lighthouse from appearing like a Hoshino and Wakabayashi "fan movie". Sakuma expected that viewers would find the talk show portions of the series plain, but did not have a problem with this due to his belief in Hoshino and Wakabayashi. Per direction from distributor Netflix, the more "rich" and "stylish" parts of the show were designated to Hoshino's opening and endings, which Sakuma put in charge to Yūko Yasunaga, noted for her work on music videos for Sakanaction.

The production team experimented with what telop (superimposed text, such as subtitles) style to use. One iteration was pure white, without color coordination, similarly to movie subtitles. In cooperation with the representative from Netflix, they created four iterations before deciding on a terop style that they thought was easy for viewers to laugh to.

=== Themes ===
What I like about those two is that they understand the pains of everyone in this world the most. And, even though they are also hurting, their cores dictate them as fighters stronger than anyone else. They never break; they do sometimes lose, but never give up. Throughout all six episodes, this program really showcases this fighter side, and I wonder if it won't inspire viewers with bravery.

— Sakuma describing his perception of Hoshino and Wakabayashi, 2023, TV Tokyo interview (translated)

Lighthouse primarily covers heavier topics such as diversity, midlife crises, stress, resentment, ego, and creative block, and spans subjects such as work, family, the future, and human relationships. When asked if he could relate to Wakabayashi's worries concerning the television industry, Sakuma claimed that the presenters' worries are not exclusive to their respective professions, rather to all people living in the present capitalist Japanese society, theorizing that the worries originate from a sense of unending conflict where the winners "create the rules". Hoshino does not consider Lighthouse a show about solving worries; instead, on the titular first ending theme "Lighthouse", he compared his and Wakabayashi's roles to a real lighthouse, shining light without consciousness of saving anyone.

The topics discussed on the show spans the presenters' past, present, and future. In the third episode "Christmas Present", Wakabayashi writes in his diary: "Someone please tell me what the present Wakabayashi should do." In response, Hoshino asks Wakabayashi if he might be feeling bored, nearly bringing Wakabayashi to tears. The scene has been noted in analysis of the show, and was transcribed by Oricon's news department as the completion of Lighthouse's "first chapter" in interviews with Sakuma and Hoshino. Around the time after filming the episode, a Tokyo Dome performance by Wakabayashi's owarai duo Audrey was finalized for 2024, alongside the creation of Wakabayashi's YouTube channel, Audrey Wakabayashi no Tokyo Dome e no Michi (transl. Audrey Wakabayashi's Journey to the Tokyo Dome). Sakuma suspected that the episode had impact on Wakabayashi, and that, throughout the planning of these projects, he was thinking about his and Hoshino's conversations. In the fifth and six episodes of Lighthouse, "Drive and Determination" and "Lighthouse" – part of a then "second chapter" – Wakabayashi discusses the experiences and newfound determination deriving from them, showing evolution from his diary in "Christmas Present". Sakuma called this interconnectivity through episodes miraculous, since the show was not filmed with an outline for topics.

Sakuma described Lighthouse as a new experiment in the talk show format, stating that, unlike many other shows, Lighthouse is not about two young people discussing dreams, nor about older people and their failures; while it follows two people who have "made it", it is not a success story, as it instead focuses on displaying the worries of the presenters' in real-time. Before filming began, Hoshino worried about not being a "conversational pro", unlike what he believed of Wakabayashi. Sakuma affirmed that this would not be a problem; owing to Hoshino's lyrics and his other statements, Sakuma had come to believe that Hoshino was someone who could understand other people's pain, and would thus be able to reciprocate Wakabayashi's worries. Sakuma attributed an ability to feel other people's pain as their own to both presenters. Above this, he described Hoshino and Wakabayashi as fighters "at their core", behind their perhaps gentle images. He stated that he had held this view on the presenters' "fighting" side since prior to Lighthouse, but felt it was emphasized to him further during the show.

=== Music ===
Hoshino created all theme music for Lighthouse. Receiving the proposal for the show, Hoshino offered to create an ending theme for every episode, thinking it sounded fun and was a never-before-done concept. He initially attempted to utilize a hikigatari (Note: A Japanese term and musical style meaning to play an instrument – often an acoustic guitar – whilst singing at the same time.) style on all tracks, but abandoned this after finding it boring. Using conversations from the show as inspiration, Hoshino adopted a method of production he compared to "messing around", composing through what he felt was natural. This resulted in varied genre, including rock, hip hop, and hikigatari.

Since the songs would play after the talk show's episode, Hoshino felt comfortable taking use of "harsher" lyrics and composition. Since the show would provide context, he believed the music would be prevented from appearing narcissistic and subsequently uninteresting. Hoshino's songs include features from Wakabayashi on the rap song "Orange" – continuing musical collaborations he and Hoshino had made on the radio program All Night Nippon – and American artists Louis Cole and Sam Gendel on "Mad Hope", the talk show's opening theme.

The six theme songs were released as an extended play on September 8, 2023. Commercially, the EP has reached over 7,000 downloads, peaking at No. 6 on Billboard Japan's Hot Albums chart and at No. 18 on Oricon's Combined Albums ranking.

== Release ==
Around the time of seeing Hoshino's guest appearance on Achikochi Audrey, Sakuma was asked by streaming service Netflix if he was interesting in working with them on a second project, following his reality show Last One Standing. When Sakuma presented the idea of Lighthouse – a talk show centered on worries – to executive producer Shinichi Takahashi from Netflix, Takahashi immediately felt that it was a presently very needed program. Netflix revealed the talk show's title and Sakuma's involvement via Twitter on July 9, 2023, with a picture of Hoshino and Wakabayashi's silhouettes, urging users to guess who was pictured. They published a trailer on August 9 and formally announced the series and further details the next day alongside a line-up of four other original Japanese variety and reality shows. The announcement was part of an initiative to expand Netflix in Japan. The Japanese branch's content manager described it as "a new phase" in their content strategy, highering investments in unscripted and new concepts from the country's "most innovative creative voices", citing that unscripted content makes up over 70% of Japanese prime time programming. Lighthouse was released worldwide with six episodes on Netflix on August 22, 2023. From August 21 to 27, it was the fourth most-viewed Japanese series on Netflix. It left the top ten list the week after.

When asked about a second season, Sakuma stated: "There are things that only those two can do, so I'm unsure if [a second season] is the best way to do things, but personally I would of course like to do it. Other than that, I would like to try new owarai with Audrey and make something standalone from Lighthouse with Hoshino-san."

== Episodes ==
No.	Title	Original release date
1	"The Dark Age"; Transliteration: "Ankoku Jidai" (Japanese: 暗黒時代)	August 22, 2023
On October 17, 2022, Hoshino and Wakabayashi meet for the first time in several months at a café in the Koenji area of Asagaya, a place they had spent much of their younger struggling years. They discuss these younger years and their pre to early careers, creative block and the uncertainty of the future, and societal expectations and public images. The ending theme is "Lighthouse".
2	"Tokyo: Light and Darkness"; Transliteration: "Tōkyō: Hikari to Yami" (Japanese: 東京〜光と闇〜)	August 22, 2023
On November 14, 2022, Wakabayashi and Hoshino gather at a two million yen (approx. US$10,000) hotel room with outlook to the Tokyo Tower. They discuss lack of confidence in exceeding past works, sympathy, equality, and social media usage. The ending theme is "Responder".
3	"Christmas Present"; Transliteration: "Christmas Purezento" (Japanese: Christmas プレゼント)	August 22, 2023
On December 25, 2022, Christmas Day, Wakabayashi and Hoshino arrive at a Christmas-decorated cottage in Adachi, Tokyo. They discuss the evolution and future of their careers. The ending theme is "Outcast".
4	"Surprise Live"; Transliteration: "Sapuraizu Raibu" (Japanese: サプライズライブ)	August 22, 2023
On February 11, 2023, a hundred people are gathered in a theater in the Toshima ward for an unstated showing. It is revealed by Hoshino and Wakabayashi to be a live performance of the yet-unannounced talk show. They continue to discuss their early lives and futures, as they recap previous moments from the show to audience members. They also briefly touch on a rap jingle they created for All Night Nippon. Wakabayashi, inspired by conversations from the first episode, reveals that he had written more rap lyrics in a similar style to the jingle. These lyrics are performed by Hoshino and Wakabayashi on the episode's ending theme, "Orange".
5	"Drive and Determination"; Transliteration: "Doraibu to Ketsui" (Japanese: ドライブと決意)	August 22, 2023
On May 6, 2023, Wakabayashi picks up Hoshino in Sendagaya, Shibuya, for a half hour car drive to Miura, Kanagawa. During the drive, they talk about their changes throughout the series, reflect on past episodes, and again discuss topics of creative block and society. They arrive at a beach in Miura and head to a café, leading into the final episode. There is no ending theme.
6	"Lighthouse"	August 22, 2023
At the café, Hoshino and Wakabayashi continue to reflect on the series and their careers, talking about their futures and goals. They are finally brought to a real lighthouse, where they retrospect a last time before walking off in different directions. The final ending theme is "Dancing Reluctantly", written from the conversations of all episodes.

== Critical response ==
Lighthouse received positive response from Japanese writers. Praise was directed towards Hoshino and Wakabayashi, and their compatibility. In an article for Aera Dot, comedy reviewer and freelancer Larry Toda applauded that Hoshino and Wakabayashi, despite their different fields, provided for perfect hosts of a talk show centering on worries. He wrote that the hosts understanding each other well allowed the discussions to progress smoothly, without need for in-depth explanations of their feelings. Film journalist Louie Takeshima, writing for QJWeb, particularly referred to Hoshino's role on the series as a "healer", primarily listening to Wakabayashi and leading him towards assurance. The scene in "Christmas Present" of Hoshino asking Wakabayashi if hey may be "bored" was highlighted to their relationship. Takeshima referred to it as the primary showcase of Hoshino's healer role, and Akira Suzuki of The Asahi Shimbun called the scene "impactful".

Toda and Suzuki agreed that Lighthouse features a documentary-like style. Toda wrote that the show served as counseling for the hosts, and attributed the documentary style to the schedule of them meeting monthly, allowing them to "regularly organize and correct" their feelings. Suzuki cited Wakabayashi developing courage after the scene in "Christmas Party" as an example of the show almost acting like a documentary. In terms of genre, Suzuki wrote that Lighthouse innovates in the tried-and-tested music mixed with variety genre through its focus on "digging deep" into the hosts' worries. Takeshima expressed the show's concept as "simple", with a strange feeling that perfectly matches the 2020s, defying categorization as "just a talk variety show" or life counseling. The show fitting the 2020s, he opined, owed to scenes where Hoshino and Wakabayashi nearly cry due to high levels of emotions. He felt this was a natural showing of the hosts separating from toxic masculinity, rather than something done to be "with the times".

Ashima Grover for LeisureByte opined that Lighthouse could be "too Japanese" for a Western audience. Rating the series 2.5 out of 5 stars, Grover called it a "unique" spin on the comedy genre, away from stand-up, but felt that conversations in later episodes were too grounded in Hoshino and Wakabayashi's pre-established careers, potentially making the show difficult for unfamiliar viewers. She thought that conversations surrounding issues discussed by the Generation Z may not stay with viewers due to "receding attention spans", but still held positive comments personally. The website Filmzine rated the show a 4.5/5, commenting that many conversation points were deeply rooted to Japanese culture, thus making the show relatable to that audience. The review summarized that Lighthouse is "healing in nature", praising it for providing new perspective and Hoshino's music for being "comforting".

== See also ==
- Tsurube Kamioka Pa-Pe-Po Television, a 1998 talk variety show hosted by two comedians
