= Sam Wilkes =

American musician (born 1991)

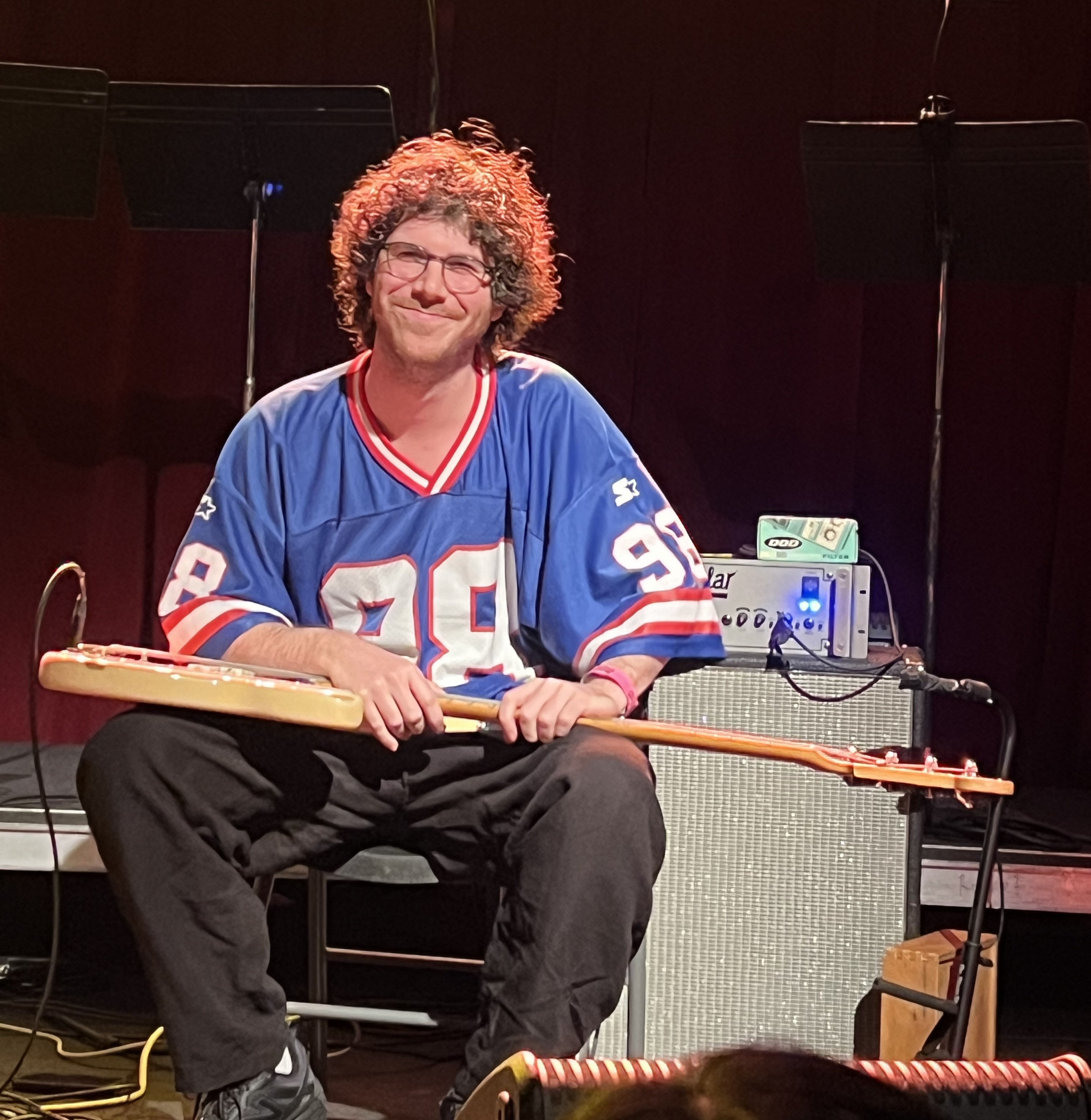
- Wilkes at Brooklyn Bowl, 2024

Background information
- Born: July 22, 1991 (age 35)
- Origin: Los Angeles, California, U.S.
- Genres: Jazz; funk; R&B; indie rock; ambient
- Occupations: Bassist; multi-instrumentalist; singer; composer; music producer
- Instruments: Electric bass; guitar; keyboards; percussion; vocals
- Years active: 2011–present
- Label: Leaving
- Website: samwilkes.net

Sam Wilkes (born July 22, 1991) is an American bassist, multi-instrumentalist, composer, and music producer. He has collaborated extensively with jazz saxophonist Sam Gendel and toured as a member of jazz-funk band Knower. Wilkes has released seven studio albums since 2018, three of which have been collaborations with Gendel.

== Early life ==
Sam Wilkes was born on July 22, 1991, and raised in Connecticut. He is the son of photographer Stephen Wilkes. He began playing electric bass as a child and was drawn to the improvisatory music of Phish and The Grateful Dead.

He studied R&B and funk music at USC Thornton School of Music in Los Angeles, where he worked under the tutelage of keyboardist Patrice Rushen and drummer Leon "Ndugu" Chancler and met saxophonist Sam Gendel, a fellow student.

== Career ==
Upon moving to Los Angeles for college, Wilkes became an active member of the city's music scene. He co-founded the indie rock duo Pratley with James Watson, releasing their debut EP in 2011 and later reuniting for a self-titled full-length album in 2017. In 2015, he toured with singer and fellow Thornton student Rozzi Crane, opening for Maroon 5 on the Maroon V Tour. He also performed with Los Angeles funk band Scary Pockets on numerous singles beginning in 2016.

In 2017, Wilkes and Sam Gendel began performing as members of jazz-funk band Knower, first joining on tour when the band opened for the Red Hot Chili Peppers, and also appearing in several viral live-recorded Knower performances on YouTube. Wilkes and Gendel joined forces for their first collaborative album Music for Saxofone & Bass Guitar, which was recorded live to tape outside a restaurant in Los Angeles and released in 2018 on Leaving Records. One track from the album, "BOA", gained popularity after being featured in the soundtrack of 2021 Netflix film Malcolm & Marie.

In 2018, Wilkes released his debut solo album Wilkes, which also features Gendel and drummer Louis Cole of Knower. It was described by Pitchfork as "a dreamy album that dissolves jazz structures into ambient, vaguely psychedelic forms" and hailed by DownBeat magazine as "one of the year's best L.A. jazz albums". In 2019, Wilkes appeared on the album Hello Happiness by Chaka Khan, also co-writing the album's title track. In 2021, Wilkes and Gendel released their second collaborative album Music for Saxofone & Bass Guitar More Songs on Leaving Records, which The New York Times named one of the best jazz albums of the year, calling it "at least as hypnotic as the first".

Wilkes's 2023 album Driving marked a departure from his ambient jazz sound, pivoting to indie rock and chamber pop music driven by acoustic guitar and featuring his own vocals. Evan Sawdey of PopMatters called it "one of the year's most dynamic and endlessly curious records". Wilkes and Gendel joined forces for their third collaborative album The Doober, which was released in 2024 on Leaving Records and features jazz-inflected covers of songs including Joni Mitchell's "The Circle Game," Judee Sill's "Rugged Road" and Sheryl Crow's "Tomorrow Never Dies".

== Discography ==
=== Studio albums ===
- Music for Saxofone & Bass Guitar (2018) (with Sam Gendel)
- Wilkes (2018)
- Music for Saxofone & Bass Guitar More Songs (2021) (with Sam Gendel)
- One Theme & Subsequent Improvisation (2021)
- Perform the Compositions of Sam Wilkes & Jacob Mann (2022) (with Jacob Mann)
- Driving (2023)
- The Doober (2024) (with Sam Gendel)
- Sam Wilkes, Craig Weinrib, and Dylan Day (2024) (with Craig Weinrib and Dylan Day)
- Uhlmann Johnson Wilkes (2025) (with Gregory Uhlmann and Josh Johnson)
- Unrelated (2026) (with Sam Gendel)

=== Live albums ===
- Live on the Green (2018)
- iiyo iiyo iiyo (2024)
- Public Records Performance (2025)

=== Compilation albums ===
- Sings (2014–2016) (2020)

=== EPs ===
- Froggy (2026) (with Sam Amidon)

=== Singles ===
104.3 (2025)
