= Sam Gendel =

American saxophonist and music producer

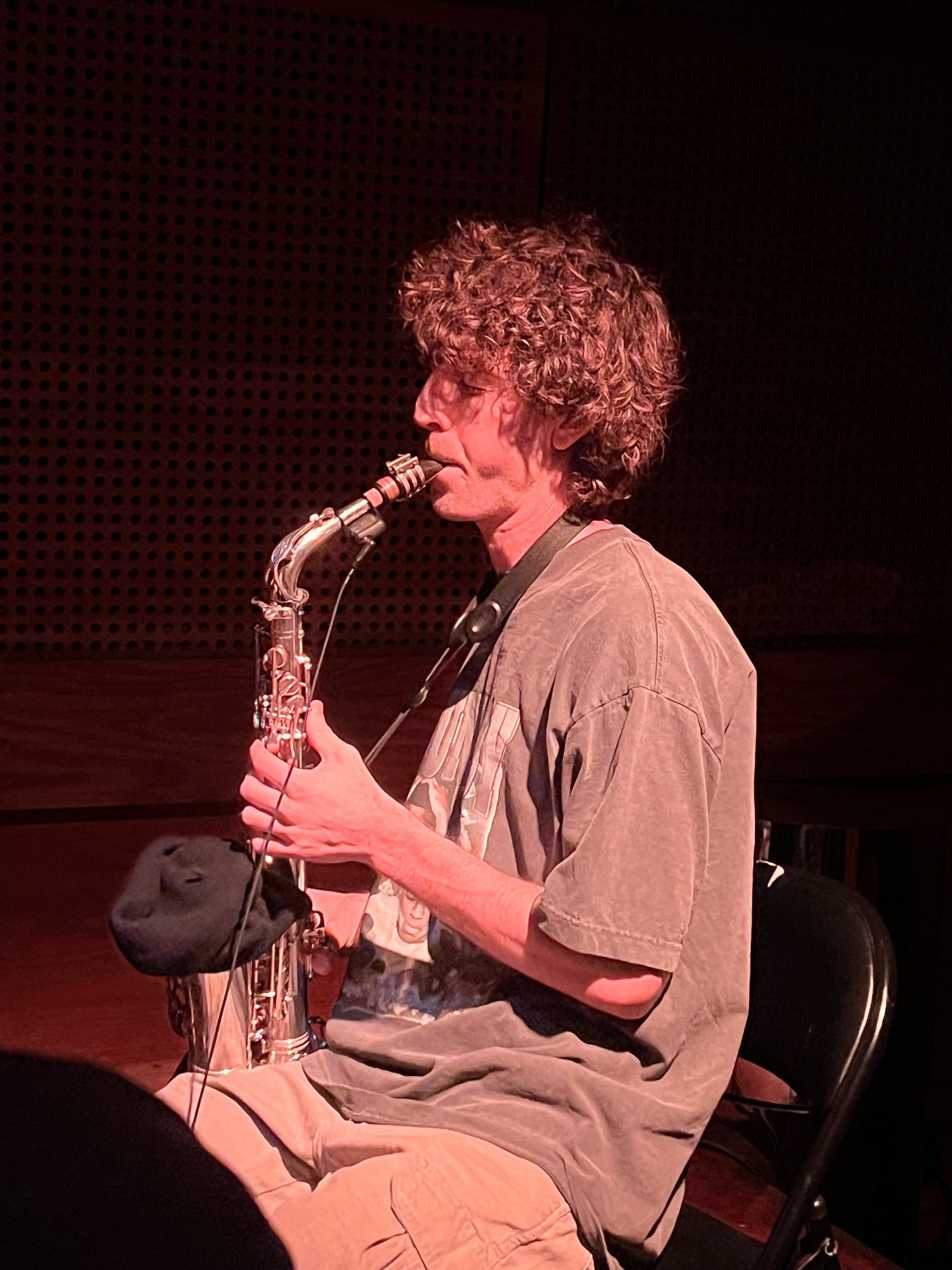
- Gendel performing at Public Records in Brooklyn, New York, 2024

Background information
- Born: Visalia, California, U.S.
- Genres: Jazz; jazz fusion
- Occupations: Saxophonist; producer
- Instruments: Alto saxophone
- Years active: 2008–present
- Label: LEAVING RECORDS
- Member of: Clown Core (speculated)
- Website: www.samgendel.com

Sam Gendel is an American saxophonist and music producer.

== Early life ==
Gendel was born in Visalia, California.

== Career ==
With bassist Sam Wilkes, Gendel released the live jazz album Music for Saxofone & Bass Guitar in 2018. Gendel co-wrote the tracks "Flower Moon" and "Spring Snow" on Vampire Weekend's 2019 album, Father of the Bride. He also recorded a 20 minute, 21 second-long version of Vampire Weekend's "2021" for the EP 40:42.

In March 2020, Gendel released his first album with Nonesuch Records, Satin Doll, which was described as "a futuristic homage to historical jazz." In an interview with The Fader's David Renshaw, Gendel claimed that "putting out a 'normal' album just doesn't work for [him]." In 2021, he released the three-hour-long album Fresh Bread, consisting of 52 tracks that were recorded between 2012 and 2020. His 2023 album Cookup reinterprets R&B classics and received a 7.0 from Pitchfork.

It has been heavily speculated that Gendel is a member of avant-garde musical duo Clown Core.

== Discography ==
=== Solo albums ===
- 4444 (2017)
- Pass If Music (2018)
- Satin Doll (2020)
- DRM (2020)
- Fresh Bread (2021)
- AE-30 (2021)
- Superstore (2022)
- blueblue (2022)
- Cookup (2023)
- Audiobook (2023)
- Landscape 1 (2024)

=== Collaborative albums / songs ===
- Music for Saxofone & Bass Guitar (2018) (with Sam Wilkes)
- Rio Nilo 66 (2021) (with Ethan Braun)
- Mouthfeel / Serene (2021) (with Josiah Steinbrick)
- Music for Saxofone & Bass Guitar More Songs (2021) (with Sam Wilkes)
- Notes With Attachments (2021) (with Pino Palladino, Blake Mills) New Deal / Impulse!
- Sam Gendel & Shin Sasakubo (2021) (with Shin Sasakubo)
- Live a Little (2022) (with Antonia Cytrynowicz)
- Grasp (2022) (with Nosaj Thing, Slauson Malone 1 & Coby Sey)
- The Room (2024) (with Fabiano do Nascimento)
- Earth Flower (2024) (with Ruth Garbus & Philippe Melanson)
- The Doober (2024) (with Sam Wilkes)
- Hardy Boys (2024) (with Emile Mosseri)
- Dream Trio (2024) (with Benny Bock & Hans P. Kjorstad)
- digi-squires (2025) (with Nate Mercereau)
- Mad Hope (feat. Louis Cole, Sam Gendel, Sam Wilkes) (2025) (with Gen Hoshino)
- Sightless Shepherd (2025) (with Darren Korb)
