= Gen Hoshino =

Japanese singer-songwriter, musician (born 1981)

- 星野 源
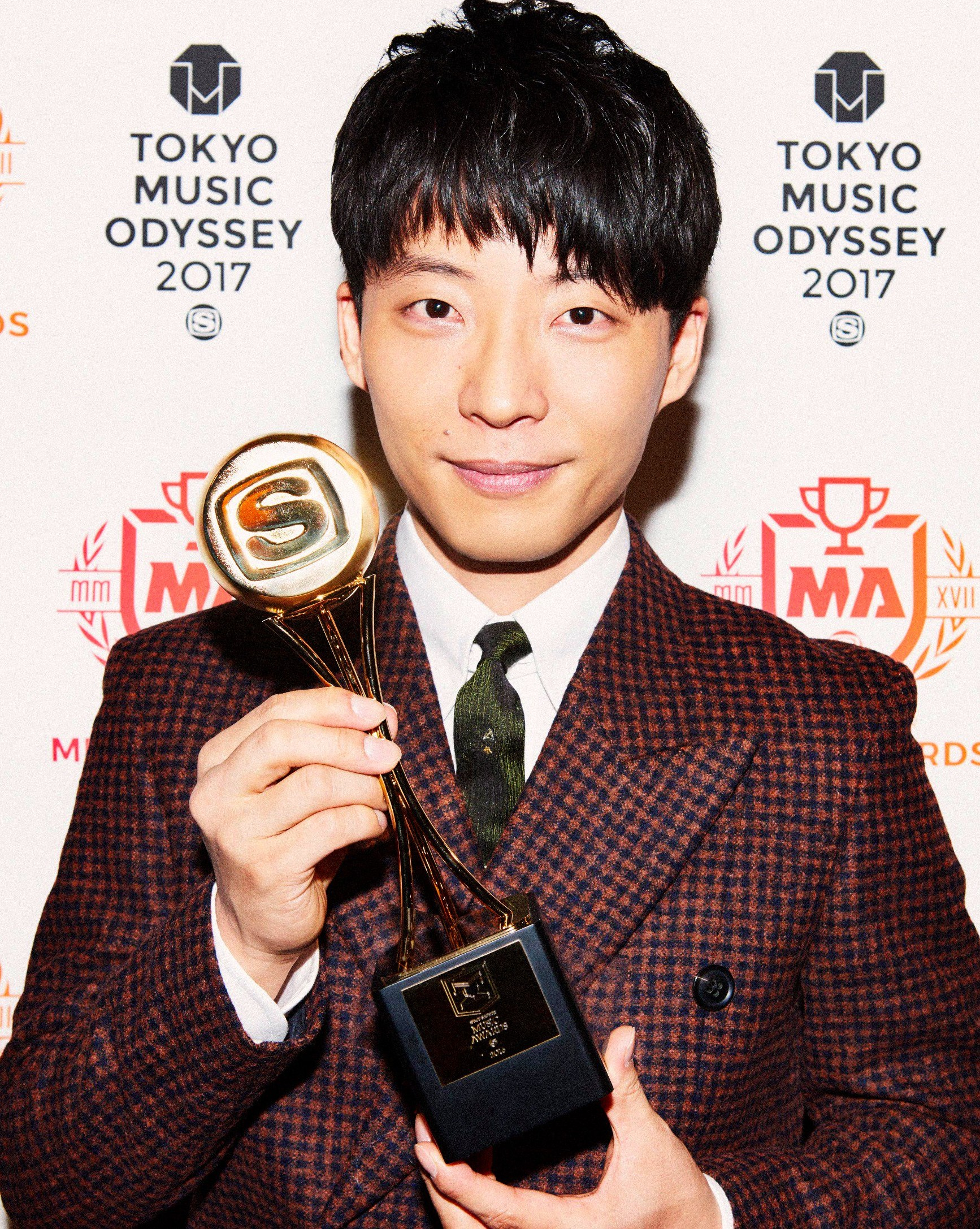
- Hoshino at the Space Shower Music Awards in 2017
- Born: January 28, 1981 (age 45); Warabi, Saitama, Japan
- Occupations: Singer; songwriter; musician; actor; writer
- Agent(s): Amuse (music); Otona Keikaku (acting)
- Spouse: Yui Aragaki (m. 2021)
- Children: 1
- Awards: Full list
- Musical career
- Genres: J-pop; folk; dance; smooth jazz
- Instruments: Vocals; guitar; marimba; keyboards
- Works: Discography; songs
- Years active: 2000–present
- Labels: Kakubarhythm; Daisyworld; Speedstar
- Formerly of: Sakerock
- Website: hoshinogen.com

Gen Hoshino (星野 源, Hoshino Gen; born January 28, 1981) (Japanese pronunciation: [hoɕino ɡeɴ]) is a Japanese singer-songwriter, musician, actor, and writer.

== Career ==
=== Music ===
From its formation in 2000 until its disbandment in 2015, Hoshino led the instrumental band Sakerock, where he played marimba and guitar. They released over ten albums. As a solo artist, he debuted with his first album Baka no Uta on June 23, 2010. His first physical single, "Kudaranai no Naka ni" was released on March 2, 2011, and peaked at number 17 on the Oricon Singles Chart. The subsequent singles – "Film", "Yume no Soto e", "Shiranai" (2012), and "Gag" (2013) – all charted in the top 10. His second album, Episode, released on September 28, 2011, peaked at number five. Hoshino's third album, Stranger, followed on May 1, 2013. It peaked at number two on the Oricon Albums Chart and was certified gold by the Recording Industry Association of Japan (RIAJ).

Since 2011, Hoshino has co-hosted the Ustream program Sake no Sakana (サケノサカナ) with Ichirō Yamaguchi of Sakanaction. In 2014, the program officially changed its name to Yoru no Television.

Hoshino's fourth album, Yellow Dancer, was released on December 2, 2015, in Japan through Speedstar Records; it debuted atop both Oricon and Billboard Japan's album charts. Yellow Dancer was certified platinum by the RIAJ that same month for surpassing 250,000 physical shipments, and became one of the few albums to receive a gold certification for digital downloads.

On February 18, 2018, Hoshino uploaded a music video for his song "Doraemon", which was written in tribute to the Japanese franchise of the same name. The song was used as the theme of the 38th Doraemon movie, Nobita's Treasure Island, and as the opening theme of the Doraemon anime from October 5, 2019, to November 2, 2024. Pop Virus, Hoshino's fifth album, was released on December 17. It spent four consecutive weeks atop the Oricon Album Chart and was certified double platinum by the RIAJ that same month. The album's commercial performance, within just a few months of its release, earned Hoshino a Best Album prize at the 33rd Japan Gold Disc Awards in 2019, as well as a Best Song prize for the digital success of the single "Idea", which was used as a theme for Asadora.

In March 2019, Hoshino also became the first artist to win four trophies at the Space Shower Music Awards. On August 30, all of Hoshino's music was made available on streaming services.

In April 2022, Hoshino's song "Comedy" was used as the ending theme of the season one anime adaptation of Spy × Family. The following July, he released the single "I Wanna Be Your Ghost", as the main theme for the film Yokaipedia (2022). It debuted at number one on Oricon's weekly Digital Singles Chart.

On December 27, 2023, Hoshino released the double A-side single "Why" / "Life" (光の跡／生命体). It features the song "Why", used in the end credits of the movie Spy × Family Code: White.

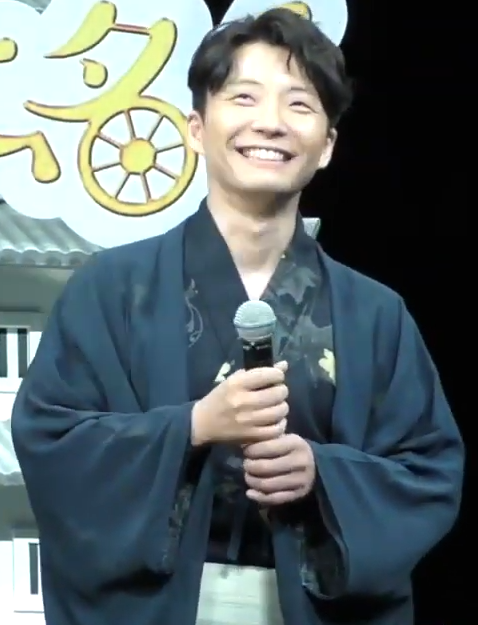
Hoshino at a screening for Samurai Shifters in 2019

=== Acting ===
Hoshino's movie debut, Lee Sang-il's 69, was an adaptation of the Ryū Murakami novel of the same name. He previously acted in various television dramas and stage plays. In 2012, he debuted as a voice actor, voicing Buddha in the original video animation (OVA) adaptation of Hikaru Nakamura's manga Saint Young Men, and also provided a theme song called "Gag" for its 2013 theatrical version, where he reprised his role.

In 2013, he played the lead character in Masahide Ichii's Blindly in Love (箱入り息子の恋, Hakoiri Musuko no Koi) alongside Kaho, and starred in the Sion Sono film Why Don't You Play in Hell?.

In 2016, Hoshino starred in TBS's The Full-Time Wife Escapist. With Yui Aragaki as his co-star, he portrayed a salaryman named Hiramasa Tsuzaki. The drama achieved steadily rising ratings, with a real-time viewership peak rating of 20.8% on the final episode, and an overall rating of 14.5%. Hoshino's performance earned him several Best Supporting Actor awards. He also provided the theme song for the drama, titled "Koi."

Gen Hoshino created the parody character "Akira Nise" (ニセ明, Nise Akira, literally Fake Akira) as a tribute to Akira Fuse.

In 2017, Hoshino lent his voice to the main character of award-winning animated film The Night Is Short, Walk On Girl. He also became the voice of the Father in Mamoru Hosoda's Mirai, which was released into theaters in Japan on July 20, 2018.

On April 30, 2018, it was announced that Hoshino would star in Samurai Shifters, the film adaptation of Akihiro Dobashi's historical novel Hikkoshi Daimyo Sanzenri, set to premier on August 30, 2019. In the movie, he plays a bookworm samurai called Harunosuke Katagiri, who receives the mission to help a daimyo move. It would be Hoshino's first lead role in a live-action movie since Blindly in Love in 2013.

In Idaten, NHK's 2019 Taiga drama, chosen for the theme to encourage the Tokyo 2020 Olympic Games, Hoshino portrayed Kazushige Hirasawa, who delivered the persuasive speech that helped determine the venue for the Tokyo 1964 Olympic Games.

== Personal life ==
On December 22, 2012, Hoshino was diagnosed with a subarachnoid hemorrhage and underwent surgery. He officially returned to public life on February 28, 2013, with his appearance at the Tokyo J-Wave Awards.

In 2021, Hoshino married actress Yui Aragaki, his co-star in the television series The Full-Time Wife Escapist. On October 13, 2026, Hoshino announced via his official website that his wife, Aragaki, had given birth to their first child.

== Discography ==
Studio albums

- Baka no Uta (2010)
- Episode (2011)
- Stranger (2013)
- Yellow Dancer (2015)
- Pop Virus (2018)
- Gen (2025)

== Filmography ==
=== Film ===
Year	Title	Role	Notes	Ref.
2004	69	Yuzuru Nakamura		
2008	Nonko 36-sai	Masaru	Lead role	
2009	Brass Knuckle Boys	Band member		
2013	Saint Young Men	Buddha	Lead role, voice	
2013	Blindly in Love	Kentaro Amanoshizuku	Lead role	
2013	Why Don't You Play in Hell?	Koji Hashimoto		
2015	Love & Peace	PC-300	Voice	
2016	Chieri and Cherry	Chieri	Lead role, voice	
2017	The Night Is Short, Walk On Girl	Senpai	Lead role, voice	
2018	Mirai	Father	Voice	
2019	Samurai Shifters	Harunosuke Katagiri	Lead role	
2019	No Smoking	Narrator		
2020	The Voice of Sin	Toshiya Sone	Lead role	
2024	Last Mile	Kazumi Shima		
2026	Grotesqqque	Kento Kunikura	Voice	

=== Television ===
==== Television drama ====
Year	Title	Role	Network	Notes	Ref.
2003	Water Boys		TBS		
2003	Manhattan Love Story		TBS	Episode 6	
2004	Dollhouse		TBS	Episode 3	
2004	Onna-tachi no Tsumi to Batsu		Fuji TV	Television special	
2004	Rikon Bengoshi		Fuji TV	Episode 2	
2004	Tokio: Message Across Time	Koji Ookubo	NHK	Episode 1	
2004	Otouto		TV Asahi	Episode 2	
2005	Affectionate Time	Yoichi Amano	Fuji TV	Episode 3	
2005	Gekidan Engimono	Hiromi	Fuji TV	Mini-drama: "Nemureru Mori no Shitai"	
2005	Tiger & Dragon	Dontsuku Hayashiyatei	TBS		
2006	Akihabara@Deep	Taiko	TBS		
2006	Mo Hitotsu no Sugar and Spice	Koyama	Fuji TV	Episode: "Saikou no Spice"	
2007	Tokyo Tower		Fuji TV	Episode 2, 3, 4	
2007	Detective School Q	Detective Nekota	NTV		
2007	Kyonen Renoir de		TV Tokyo	Lead role	
2008	Mirai Koshi Meguru	Eguchi Hideo	TV Asahi		
2008	Weekly Yoko Maki	Hiroshi Inoue	TV Tokyo	Episode: "Chouchou no Mama de"	
2009	Ghost Friends	Shinji	NHK	Episode 5	
2010	Gegege no Nyobo	Takashi Iida	NHK	Asadora	
2010	Shukujo – Season 2	Himself	NHK	Episode 5 guest appearance	
2010	Kaiju o Yobu Otoko	Kota Soejima	NHK BShi	Lead role, television special	
2011	Odd Family Eleven	Hiroyuki Sanada	TV Asahi		
2014	Last Night's Curry, Tomorrow's Bread	Kazuki Terayama	NHK		
2015	Kouhaku ga Umareta Hi	George Mabuchi	NHK	Television special	
2015	Dr. Storks	Haruki Shinomiya	TBS	Season 1	
2016	Sanada Maru	Hidetada Tokugawa	NHK	Taiga drama	
2016	The Full-Time Wife Escapist	Hiramasa Tsuzaki	TBS		
2017	Plage	Takao Yoshimura	Wowow	Lead role	
2017	Dr. Storks	Haruki Shinomiya	TBS	Season 2	
2019	Idaten	Kazushige Hirasawa	NHK	Taiga drama	
2020	MIU404	Kazumi Shima	TBS	Lead role	
2022	Teen Regime	Kiyoshi Taira	NHK	Mini-series	

==== Video games ====
Year	Title	Role	Note
2025	Death Stranding 2: On the Beach	Himself	His songs are featured in the game

==== Variety shows ====
Year	Title	Network	Note	Ref.
2012–	The Comedy of Life	NHK		
2017–18	Ogen-san to Issho	NHK	2 episodes	
2023	Lighthouse	Netflix	Co-presenter	

==== TV commercials ====
- NTT DOCOMO, "ZeniCrazy Ver1.0" (February 2019)
- NTT DOCOMO, "ZeniCrazy Ver2.0" (March 2019)
- Nintendo, "Super Mario Bros. 35th Anniversary" (September 2020)

=== Original video animation ===
- Onna no Sono no Hoshi (2022), Hoshi

== Concerts and tours ==
Headlining tours

- Baka no Uta Hatsubai Kinen no Live (2010)
- Hoshino Gen no Aisatsu Mawari Tour (2010)
- Hoshino Gen no Betsu Episode: Heya (2011)
- Episode Hatsubai Kinen Tour: Episode 2 Ikou (2012)
- Hoshino Gen One-Man no Aki (2012)
- Hoshino Gen no Fukkatsu Live Tour (2014)
- Hoshino Gen Live Tour 2016: Yellow Voyage (2016)
- Hoshino Gen Live Tour 2017: Continues (2017)
- Hoshino Gen Dome Tour 2019: Pop Virus (2019)
- Hoshino Gen Pop Virus World Tour (2019)
- Gen Hoshino presents Reassembly (2022)
- Gen Hoshino presents Mad Hope Japan Tour / Asia Tour (2025)

Concerts

- Live in Japan 2018 Gen Hoshino & Mark Ronson
