= List of awards and nominations received by Gen Hoshino =

Gen Hoshino awards and nominations
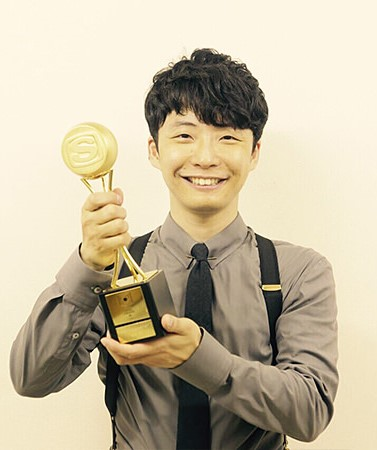
- Hoshino as Best Male Artist at the 2016 Space Shower Music Awards
Awards and nominations
Award	Wins	Nominations
Anime Trending Awards	1	1
Blue Ribbon	0	1
Booklog Awards	1	1
CD Shop Awards	5	5
Confidence Award Drama Prize	1	1
Crunchyroll Anime Awards	1	2
Elan d'or Awards	1	1
Galaxy Japan	4	4
GQ Japan	2	2
Hochi Film Awards	1	1
Hōso Bunka Foundation Awards	1	1
Japan Academy Film Prize	3	3
Japan Essay Club Award	0	1
Japan Gold Disc Awards	4	4
Japanese Movie Critics Awards	1	1
Japan Professional Music Recording Awards	1	1
Japan Record Awards	1	1
JASRAC Awards	1	1
Juzo Itami Award	1	1
Mainichi Film Awards	1	1
MTV Japan	9	10
Music Awards Japan	1	10
Music Jacket Awards	2	3
Nikkan Sports Drama Grand Prix	2	2
Seoul International Drama Awards	0	1
Space Shower	13	18
The Television Drama Academy Awards	6	8
Tama Film Awards	1	1
Tokio Hot 100 Awards	1	1
Tokyo Drama Awards	1	1
Yokohama Film Festival	1	1

Totals (Note: Certain award groups do not simply award one winner. They acknowledge several different recipients, have runners-up, and have third place. Since this is a specific recognition and is different from losing an award, runner-up mentions are considered wins in this award tally. For simplification and to avoid errors, each award in this list has been presumed to have had a prior nomination.)
- Wins: 68
- Nominations: 90

The Japanese singer-songwriter, musician, and actor Gen Hoshino has been nominated for and won various awards.

== Awards and nominations ==
List of award wins and nominations, with year of ceremony, category, nominated works, and results
Award	Year	Category	Recipient	Result	Ref.
GQ Japan Awards	2020	Inspiration of the Year	Gen Hoshino	Won (Note: Awarded for work including lead acting role in MIU404, music-related celebrations of the tenth anniversary of his debut album, and the social media trend concerning his song "Dancing on the Inside")	
GQ Japan Awards	2024	Global Creativity Award	Gen Hoshino	Won (Note: Awarded for work concerning music (including curation of a stage at the Summer Sonic Festival, international collaborations, and music variety programs), radio, and literature)	
Juzo Itami Award	2017	Itami Juzo Prize	Gen Hoshino	Won (Note: Awarded for work concerning music, radio, and acting)	
Music awards
Anime Trending Awards	2022	Ending Theme Song of the Year	"Comedy" (Note: As the ending theme to Spy × Family)	Runner-up	
CD Shop Awards	2011	Grand Prix	Baka no Uta	Finalist	
CD Shop Awards	2012	Grand Prix	Episode	Runner-up	
CD Shop Awards	2015	Live Video Award	Stranger in Budokan	Won	
CD Shop Awards	2016	Grand Prix	Yellow Dancer	Won	
CD Shop Awards	2019	Grand Prix	Pop Virus	Won	
Crunchyroll Anime Awards	2023	Best Anime Song	"Comedy"	Nominated	
Crunchyroll Anime Awards	2023	Best Ending Sequence	"Comedy"	Won	
Japan Gold Disc Awards	2017	Domestic Song of the Year by Download	"Koi"	Won	
Japan Gold Disc Awards	2017	Best 5 Songs by Download	"Koi"	Placed	
Japan Gold Disc Awards	2019	Best 5 Albums	Pop Virus	Placed	
Japan Gold Disc Awards	2019	Best 5 Songs by Download	"Idea"	Placed	
Japan Professional Music Recording Awards	2019	Best Pop / Kayōkyoku Award	"Pop Virus"	Won	
Japan Record Awards	2016	Excellence Album Award	Yellow Dancer	Won	
JASRAC Awards	2018	Gold Award	"Koi"	Won	
MTV Video Music Awards Japan	2012	Best Male Video	"Film"	Nominated	
MTV Video Music Awards Japan	2014	Best Video from a Film	"Why Don't You Play in Hell?" (Note: As the theme song to Why Don't You Play in Hell?)	Won	
MTV Video Music Awards Japan	2015	Best Male Video — Japan	"Sun"	Won	
MTV Video Music Awards Japan	2017	Video of the Year	"Family Song"	Won	
MTV Video Music Awards Japan	2017	Best Male Video — Japan	"Family Song"	Won	
MTV Video Music Awards Japan	2017	Best Choreography	"Koi"	Won	
MTV Video Music Awards Japan	2018	Best Art Direction	"Idea"	Won	
MTV Video Music Awards Japan	2018	Best Pop Video	"Idea"	Won	
MTV Video Music Awards Japan	2019	Album of the Year	Pop Virus	Won	
MTV Video Music Awards Japan	2021	Best Solo Video	"Fushigi"	Won	
Music Awards Japan	2025	Best Japanese R&B/Contemporary Artist	Gen Hoshino	Nominated	
Music Awards Japan	2026	Album of the Year	Gen	Nominated	
Music Awards Japan	2026	Best Japanese R&B/Contemporary Song	"Eureka"	Nominated	
Music Awards Japan	2026	Best Japanese R&B/Contemporary Song	"Mad Hope" (featuring Louis Cole, Sam Gendel, and Sam Wilkes)	Nominated	
Music Awards Japan	2026	Best Japanese R&B/Contemporary Song	"Star"	Nominated	
Music Awards Japan	2026	Best Cross-Border Collaboration Song	"2" (featuring Lee Young-ji)	Won	
Music Awards Japan	2026	Best Japanese R&B/Contemporary Artist	Gen Hoshino	Nominated	
Music Awards Japan	2026	Best Artwork	Gen	Nominated	
Music Awards Japan	2026	Best of Listeners' Choice: Japanese Song	"Eureka"	Nominated	
Music Awards Japan	2026	Best Analog Record Sales	Gen	Nominated	
Music Jacket Awards	2014	Grand Prix	"Gag"	Runner-up	
Music Jacket Awards	2015	Grand Prix	"Crazy Crazy" / "Sakura no Mori"	Nominated	
Music Jacket Awards	2016	Grand Prix	Yellow Dancer	Won	
Space Shower Music Awards (Note: Known as the Space Shower Music Video Awards in the ceremonies 2013–2015)	2009	Best Conceptual Video	"Honyarara" (with Sakerock)	Won	
Space Shower Music Awards	2013	Video of the Year	"Yume no Soto e"	Nominated	
Space Shower Music Awards	2014	Video of the Year	"Bakemono"	Nominated	
Space Shower Music Awards	2015	Video of the Year	"Crazy Crazy"	Nominated	
Space Shower Music Awards	2016	Best Male Artist	Gen Hoshino	Won	
Space Shower Music Awards	2017	Video of the Year	"Koi"	Won	
Space Shower Music Awards	2017	Best Male Artist	Gen Hoshino	Nominated	
Space Shower Music Awards	2018	Best Art Direction Video	"Family Song"	Won	
Space Shower Music Awards	2018	Best Male Artist	Gen Hoshino	Nominated	
Space Shower Music Awards	2018	People's Choice	Gen Hoshino	Won	
Space Shower Music Awards	2019	Album of the Year	Pop Virus	Won	
Space Shower Music Awards	2019	Artist of the Year	Gen Hoshino	Won	
Space Shower Music Awards	2019	Best Pop Artist	Gen Hoshino	Won	
Space Shower Music Awards	2019	People's Choice	Gen Hoshino	Won	
Space Shower Music Awards	2020	Best Influential Artist	Gen Hoshino	Won	
Space Shower Music Awards	2020	Best Collaboration	"Same Thing" (with Superorganism)	Won	
Space Shower Music Awards	2021	Best New Vision	Gen Hoshino	Won	
Space Shower Music Awards	2022	Video of the Year	"Fushigi"	Won	
The Television Drama Academy Awards	2015	Drama Song Award	"Sun" (Note: As the theme song to Kokoro ga Pokitto ne)	Nominated	
The Television Drama Academy Awards	2016	Drama Song Award	"Koi" (Note: As the theme song to The Full-Time Wife Escapist)	Won	
The Television Drama Academy Awards	2017	Drama Song Award	"Family Song" (Note: As the theme song to Kahogo no Kahoko)	3rd	
The Television Drama Academy Awards	2018	Drama Song Award	"Idea" (Note: As the theme song to Half Blue Sky)	Won	
The Television Drama Academy Awards	2021	Drama Song Award	"Fushigi" (Note: As the theme song to Why I Dress Up for Love)	3rd	
The Television Drama Academy Awards	2025	Drama Song Award	"Eureka" (Note: As the theme song to Diary of a Surgical Resident: Madoka)	Nominated	
Tokio Hot 100 Awards	2012 (Note: Awarded in February 2013 but ceremony dated as 2012)	Artist of the Year	Gen Hoshino	Won	
Tokyo Drama Awards	2017	Theme Song Award	"Koi"	Won	
Acting awards
Blue Ribbon Awards	2020 (Note: Awarded in January 2021 but ceremony dated as 2020)	Best Supporting Actor (Male)	The Voice of Sin	Nominated	
Confidence Award Drama Prize	2016	Best Supporting Actor (Male)	The Full-Time Wife Escapist	Won	
Elan d'or Awards	2017	Newcomer Award	Gen Hoshino	Won	
Hochi Film Awards	2020	Best Supporting Actor	The Voice of Sin	Won	
Japan Academy Film Prize	2014	Newcomer of the Year	Blindly in Love and Why Don't You Play in Hell?	Won	
Japan Academy Film Prize	2020	Popularity Award (Actor)	Samurai Shifters	Won	
Japan Academy Film Prize	2021	Outstanding Performance by an Actor in a Supporting Role	The Voice of Sin	Finalist	
Japanese Movie Critics Awards	2013	Best Newcomer (Male)	Blindly in Love	Won	
Mainichi Film Awards	2013	Sponichi Grand Prix Newcomer Award	Blindly in Love	Won	
Nikkan Sports Drama Grand Prix	2016	Best Supporting Actor	The Full-Time Wife Escapist	3rd	
Nikkan Sports Drama Grand Prix	2016	Best Supporting Actor (Autumn)	The Full-Time Wife Escapist	Won	
Seoul International Drama Awards	2017	Best Actor	The Full-Time Wife Escapist	Nominated	
Tama Film Awards	2013	Best Newcomer Actor	Blindly in Love, Why Don't You Play in Hell?, and Saint Young Men	Won	
The Television Drama Academy Awards	2016	Supporting Actor Award (Male)	The Full-Time Wife Escapist	Won	
The Television Drama Academy Awards	2020	Best Actor (Male)	MIU404	3rd	
Yokohama Film Festival	2013	Best Newcomer	Blindly in Love and Why Don't You Play in Hell?	Won	
Radio and variety program awards
Galaxy Awards	2017	DJ Personality Award	Hoshino Gen no All Night Nippon	Won	
Galaxy Awards	2017	Monthly Award (May)	Ogen-san to Issho	Won	
Galaxy Awards	2018	Encouragement Award (Television)	Ogen-san to Issho	Won	
Galaxy Awards	2018	Encouragement Award (Radio)	Hoshino Gen no All Night Nippon: "Dododo... Doraemon Special!"	Won	
Hōso Bunka Foundation Awards	2023 (Note: Awarded in June 2024 but ceremony dated as 2023)	Encouragement Award (Radio)	Hoshino Gen no All Night Nippon (Note: Awarded for the broadcast dated January 2, 2024, which aimed to provide relief following yesterday's Noto earthquake)	Won	
Literary awards
Booklog Grand Prix	2017	Essay/Non-Fiction Book of the Year	Inochi no Shasō kara	Won	
Japan Essay Club Award	2025	Essay Club Award	Inochi no Shasō kara 2	Nominated	

== Rankings ==
List of selected rankings such as listicles that have included Gen Hoshino, with name of publication, subject of list, and placement
Publication	Year	List	Placement	Ref.
Billboard Japan	2022	Japan Hot 100 All-Time Top 50	5th ("Koi")	
Da Vinci	2017	Essay/Non-Fiction Book of the Year	1st (Inochi no Shasō kara)	
Da Vinci	2024	Essay/Non-Fiction Book of the Year	1st (Inochi no Shasō kara 2)	
Musica	2021	100 Best Japanese Albums of the 2010s	24th (Yellow Dancer)	
The Nikkei	2017	Talent Power Ranking	1st	
Oricon	2013	10 Upcoming Breakout Actors	5th	
