= Live Tour: Continues =

Video (live) by Gen Hoshino
- Released: January 10, 2018
- Recorded: September 9–10, 2017
- Venue: Saitama Super Arena, Saitama Prefecture, Japan
- Length: 4:02:00
- Language: Japanese
- Label: Speedstar

Gen Hoshino video chronology
Music Video Tour 2010–2017 (2017)	Live Tour: Continues (2018)	Dome Tour: Pop Virus at Tokyo Dome (2019)

Live Tour: Continues (Japanese pronunciation: [ɾaibɯtsɯꜜaː kontiɲɯꜜːzɯ]) is the fourth live video album by Japanese singer-songwriter and musician Gen Hoshino. It was released on January 10, 2018, via Speedstar Records in DVD and Blu-ray formats. The album is a video release of the final show of Hoshino's Continues live tour, filmed at the Saitama Super Arena from September 9 to 10, 2017. The second disc includes the original tour documentary To Be Continue(s), following Hoshino throughout the tour's behind-the-scenes.

The tour shares its name with Hoshino's song "Continues", commissioned for SKY PerfecTV!'s broadcast of the 2016 Summer Paralympics. He wrote the song with themes of following and continuing, inspired by musician Haruomi Hosono of Yellow Magic Orchestra after he told Hoshino to take care of the future. Similarly, the live tour was conceived as a concept tour about connecting music history. As an example of this theme, the setlists included covers of Martin Denny's "Firecracker", the "Firecracker"-inspired Yellow Magic Orchestra song "Mad Pierrot", and the "Mad Pierrot"-inspired Hoshino song "Tokiyo". The tour featured an original voice drama written by Hoshino, depicting characterizations of kayōkyoku (Akio Otsuka) and J-pop (Mamoru Miyano) attending a concert of yellow music, Hoshino's description of his own music.

Performances of "Amaoto" and "Sun" were uploaded to YouTube to promote the album. The tour and video release were received positively by music critics, who praised the performance and theme. Live Tour: Continues reached first place on Oricon's Blu-ray and DVD charts, tying Hoshino for the record of most consecutive number ones on the charts as a solo male artist. It was certified Gold by the Recording Industry Association of Japan (RIAJ) for surprassing 100,000 sales, and was named at numbers 16 and 25 on Oricon's year-end DVDs and Blu-rays charts, respectively.

== Background and tour ==
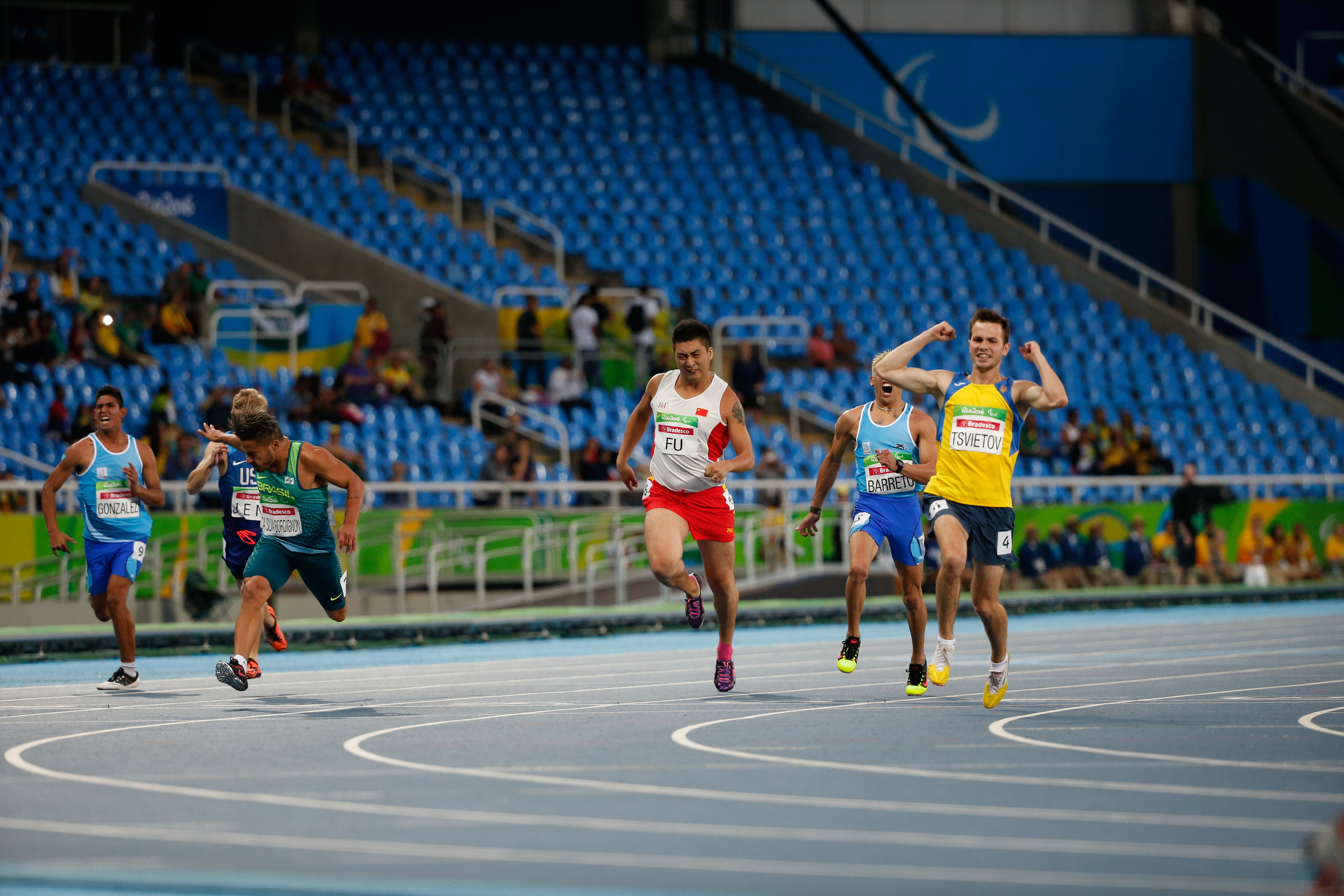
The title song "Continues" was used for SKY PerfecTV! broadcast of the 2016 Summer Paralympics (Men's 100 meters pictured).

Ending his Yellow Voyage tour at the Osaka-jō Hall in March 2016, Hoshino announced that he would like to tour again in the near future. On August 5, 2016, Hoshino unveiled his new song "Continues" via a video message and commercial showed at a press event by the television channel SKY PerfecTV!. It would be used as the theme song to the channel's broadcast of the 2016 Summer Paralympics, set to be hosted in September in Rio de Janeiro, Brazil. A song about following (伝う, tsutau) and continuing (続く, tsuzuku), "Continues" was written in respect to musician Haruomi Hosono of Yellow Magic Orchestra after he told Hoshino: "Take care of the future for me" (未来をよろしく, Mirai o yorshiku). "Continues" was included as a B-side on Hoshino's single "Koi" (2016) and also featured on his fifth studio album Pop Virus (2018).

During the encore of his two-day concert Yellow Pacific at Pacifico Yokohama on January 24, 2017, Hoshino announced Hoshino Gen Live Tour 2017: Continues, his first arena tour, to visit venues across nine cities in Japan under the same name as the song. A tenth show at the Saitama Super Arena was added to the performance list post-announcement. A concept tour, it focused on heritage in music and connecting music history. Setlists were opened with a cover of Martin Denny's instrumental "Firecracker" (1959), the song which inspired Hosono to write "Mad Pierrot" (1978) on Yellow Magic Orchestra's debut eponymous studio album. "Mad Pierrot" features as the thirteenth song, followed by Hoshino's "Mad Pierrot"-inspired "Tokiyo" (2015). The theming of the tour made Hoshino feel comfortable including songs that had personally impacted him and those he would not usually perform live, such as a cover of Number Girl's "Tōmei Shōjo" (1999) or his own single "Gag" (2013). "Family Song" (2017), written by Hoshino during the tour, was exclusively featured in the Saitama show in its debut live performance.

Continues opened at the Marine Messe Fukuoka on May 21, 2017, and ended at the Saitama Super Arena on September 10. Among others, the tour featured Eiko Ishibashi on keyboard and marimba, tour bandleader Ryosuke Nagaoka on guitar, the troupe Elevenplay with background dance performance, and also saw Hoshino playing guitar or marimba on select tracks, such as the cover of "Firecracker". The opening of shows featured a voice drama written by Hoshino, starring voice actors Akio Otsuka and Mamoru Miyano, the latter known for work as Rintaro Okabe in Steins;Gate (2011) and the former as Solid Snake in the Metal Gear Solid franchise, a personal favorite video game of Hoshino. The drama sees Kayōkyoku-senpai (Otsuka) and his music junior J-POP (Miyano) attending a concert of yellow music, the term used by Hoshino to describe his music. In its second part, TV writer Naoki Terasaki portrays the characterization of yellow music. A writer for Billboard Japan described it as a drama about the past and present, and the music that connects to the future. The tour also featured video messages by characters portrayed by comedians Ryūji Akiyama of Robert, Bakarhythm, and Bananaman members Yūki Himura and Osamu Shitara.

== Promotion and release ==
External videos
- "Amaoto" (Live at Saitama Super Arena 2017)
- "Sun" (Live at Saitama Super Arena 2017); In promotion of the live album, performances of "Amaoto" and "Sun" were uploaded to YouTube.

On October 24, 2017, it was announced that both days of Continues' show at the Saitama Super Arena would be released as a Blu-ray and DVD video album. In promotion of the release, its performances of "Amaoto" and "Sun" were uploaded to YouTube throughout December 2017. A trailer to the album was uploaded on December 28, previewing select songs from the album including "Family Song" and "Koi", as well as short clips from its second disc tour documentary. Hoshino announced that the Nise Puppet Tour: Continues would be hosted through December to January to commemorate the release, displaying dolls of Hoshino's alter ego character Akira Nise at select Tower Records Japan stores.

Live Tour: Continues was released via the Victor Entertainment label Speedstar Records on January 10, 2018. The album's cover art was created by Yuni Yoshida, who had also designed the cover for "Family Song". With the entirety of the Saitama show except the encore on the first disc, the second disc includes the original tour documentary To Be Continue(s), following Hoshino throughout the four month-long tour. It includes footage of the backstage and rehearsals, Hoshino chatting with his bandmates, and an interview he gave a month after the tour's conclusion. Limited editions were bundled with a booklet of photos, an analysis of the tour by Musica editor Arizumi Tomoko, and a three-way talk by Hoshino, Nagaoka, and Terasaki.

In April 2020, three years after its release, the performances of "Yume no Soto e", "Family Song", and "Kimi wa Bara yori Utsukushī" were released to YouTube alongside videos from Hoshino's other tours/concerts.

== Reception ==
Continues was received positively by music critics, who praised it in both live reports and reviews of the video release. Emi Sugiura at Rockin'On Japan described the Saitama show as a "miracle-like" performance – deep but enjoyable to anyone – "undoubtedly" born from Hoshino celebrating music. She had wished for a home version after watching the tour in person and celebrated the release, praising the performance of Hoshino and the tour band as "wholeheartedly beautiful". A reporter for Billboard Japan wrote that the Saitama performance "heated up" when Hoshino appeared on stage with marimba to play "Firecracker". Both the Billboard writer and a reporter for Natalie.mu gave similar praise for the performances of "Gag" and "Sun".

The tour's theme and direction was a recurring point of praise. Oguri, a staff reviewer for Tower Records Japan, complimented the tour for its unique elements – covers of YMO, Martin Denny, Number Girl, and a voice drama – making it a "performance [...] unexperiancable elsewhere". Real Sound live reporter Yuki Wakata wrote that all aspects of Continues were carefully constructed with the theme of connecting music in mind, calling the lyrics sung on "Tokiyo" illustrative of this theme: "Time goes on, moving us forward" / "Without meaning". Sugiura felt that the Saitama show showcased, through entertainment and a "fantastic" tour, exactly what Hoshino wanted and his present thoughts on music.

Commercially, it was reported that Continues accumulated a total attendance of 200,000. The video album sold 47,000 DVDs and 52,000 Blu-ray copies within four days, opening at first place on Oricon's DVD and Blu-ray charts dated January 22, 2018. Following Live Tour: Yellow Voyage (2016) and Music Video Tour 2010–2017 (2017), it was Hoshino's third consecutive video release to top the charts, tying him with Koichi Domoto as the solo male artist with most consecutive DVD and Blu-ray number-ones; Hoshino would later take the record for himself with the release of Dome Tour: Pop Virus at Tokyo Dome (2018). Combined sales climbed to 100,000 by the end of January 2018, receiving a Gold certification from the Recording Industry Association of Japan (RIAJ). By the end of the year, Live Tour: Continues had reached 118,291 accumulative sales (58,880 DVDs and 59,411 Blu-rays), ranking on Oricon's year-end charts as the 16th best-selling DVD and as the 25th for Blu-rays. For the music-specific video charts, it ranked at numbers 12 and 15 for Blu-rays and DVDs, respectively.

== Personnel ==
Credits adapted from Natalie.mu's report of the Saitama performance and Real Sound's article detailing the video album track listing.

- Gen Hoshino – vocals, marimba, guitar, voice drama script
- Eiko Ishibashi – keyboard, marimba, flute
- Ryosuke Nagaoka – bandleader, guitar
- Noriyasu Kawamura – drums
- Wataru Iga – bass
- Yasuhiro Sakurada – piano, keyboard
- Satoshi Takeshi – saxophone, flute
- Motoi Murakami – trumpet
- Mio Okamura – violin
- Mikiyo Kikuchi – viola
- Kaori Imai – cello
- Elevenplay – background dancing
- Akio Otsuka (as Kayōkyoku-senpai) – voice drama
- Mamoru Miyano (as J-POP) – voice drama
- Naoki Terasaki (as Yellow Music) – voice drama
- Ryūji Akiyama (as Dragon) – video message
- Hidetomo Masuno (as the Bakarhythm) – video message
- Yūki Himura (as J-Tarō) – video message
- Osamu Shitara (as J-Tarō) – video message

== Track listing ==
All tracks are written by Gen Hoshino expect where otherwise noted.

Disc one

1. "Firecracker" (Martin Denny) – 2:36
2. "Bakemono" – 2:52
3. "Sakura no Mori" – 6:00
4. "Night Troop" – 4:11
5. "Amaoto" – 4:59
6. "Kudaranai no Naka ni" – 4:23
7. "Film" – 5:27
8. "Yume no Soto e" – 4:01
9. "Ichiryū Musician kara no O Iwai Message" – 3:32
10. "Ana o Horu" – 2:43
11. "Tōmei Shōjo" (Shutoku Mukai) – 4:04
12. "Kuse no Uta" – 5:28
13. "Mad Pierrot" (Haruomi Hosono) – 5:35
14. "Tokiyo" – 4:43
15. "Gag" – 4:43
16. "Sun" – 4:00
17. "Koi" – 4:11
18. "Week End" – 5:43
19. "Continues" – 5:24

Disc two

1. "Kimi wa Bara yori Utsukushī" (Kenji Kadoya, Mickie Yoshino) (Encore) – 9:29
2. "Drinking Dance" (Encore) – 4:12
3. "Family Song" (Encore) – 5:35
4. "Friend Ship" (Encore) – 7:09
5. "Tour Documentary: To Be Continue(s)"

Total length: 4:02:00

== Charts ==
=== Weekly charts ===
Weekly chart performance for Live Tour: Continues (2018)
Chart (2018)	Peak position
Japanese DVDs (Oricon)	1
Japanese Blu-rays (Oricon)	1

=== Year-end charts ===
Year-end chart performance for Live Tour: Continues (2018)
Chart (2018)	Position
Japanese DVDs (Oricon)	16
Japanese Music DVDs (Oricon)	15
Japanese Blu-rays (Oricon)	25
Japanese Music Blu-rays (Oricon)	12

== Certifications ==
Certifications for Live Tour: Continues
Region	Certification	Certified units/sales
Japan (RIAJ)	Gold	118,291

== Release history ==
Release history for Live Tour: Yellow Voyage
Region	Date	Edition	Format	Label	Catalogue code	Ref.
Japan	January 10, 2018	Standard	Blu-ray	Speedstar Records	VIXL-206~207	
Japan	January 10, 2018	Standard	DVD	Speedstar Records	VIBL-873~874	
Japan	January 10, 2018	Limited	Blu-ray	Speedstar Records	VIZL-1293	
Japan	January 10, 2018	Limited	DVD	Speedstar Records	VIZL-1294	
