= Week End (Gen Hoshino song) =

2015 promotional single by Gen Hoshino

Promotional single by Gen Hoshino

from the album Yellow Dancer
- Language: Japanese
- Released: October 20, 2015
- Genre: Dance
- Length: 4:30
- Label: Speedstar
- Songwriter: Gen Hoshino
- Producer: Gen Hoshino

Listening video
- "Week End" on YouTube

"Week End" (Japanese pronunciation: [ɯiːkɯeꜜɴdo]) is a song by Japanese singer-songwriter and musician Gen Hoshino from his fourth studio album, Yellow Dancer (2015). The song is the album's sole promotional single, released for exclusive airplay on the Japan FM League on October 20, 2015, and was also promoted with a listening video. Written and produced by Hoshino as the theme song to the morning news program Mezamashi Saturday, it is a pop-like dance song that draws influence from black music genres, such as R&B and soul. Lyrically, Hoshino in falsetto encourages listeners to dance freely.

The song was received positively by album reviewers, who praised its sound as exciting. "Week End" peaked at number 21 on the Billboard Japan Hot 100 and was certified gold by the Recording Industry Association of Japan (RIAJ) for paid digital downloads. The song was particularly successful in airplay, ranking on Billboard Japan's year-end radio songs lists for both 2015 and 2016. It had its debut performance on the music program Music Station, after which Hoshino featured the song on the 2016 Yellow Voyage tour with dance performance from Elevenplay.

== Background and release ==
In writing "Week End", Hoshino used a mental image of someone waking up on a Saturday morning and finding themself on a dance floor; with a spinning disco ball above their head, the person springs awake and begins to dance. A fan of week ends, he wanted to replicate a Saturday feeling: something that would be felt more physically than words. Hoshino told Musica that he already had a clear picture of the song's soundscape at the beginning of production. Finding it difficult to explain his ideas, he spent much time with the song's engineer, Takahiro Uchida, adjusting different elements. Though the production period was long, Hoshino felt that the songwriting environment – which he described as the best of his career – allowed him to not worry about time constraints and instead focus on what he and the staff team could do. By the completion of Yellow Dancer, he looked at "Week End" as a vital part of the album's identity, in contrast to tracks such as "Sun", which he viewed more strongly as individual songs.

"Week End" was announced in an episode of the Fuji Television morning show Mezamashi Saturday on September 26, 2015. The song, which at the time was not set for an official release, would be the show's new theme song, starting with the October 3 broadcast. On October 14, Hoshino announced his fourth studio album, Yellow Dancer, and announced select songs on the track listing including "Week End". The song used as a promotional track, and was sent to the five radio stations associated with the Japan FM League (JFM; consisting of FM North Wave, J-Wave, Zip FM, FM802, and Cross FM) for an airplay release on October 20, 2015. When Yellow Dancer's track listing was unveiled on October 28, "Week End" was shown as the album's second track, placing after "Tokiyo" and before "Sun". Hoshino released a listen along video for "Week End" on November 27, 2015, featuring part of the song and an explanation to the contents of Yellow Dancer. It was the first such video released for the album, with a similar visual to the album-ender "Friend Ship" uploaded in June 2016. Yellow Dancer was released by Speedstar Records on December 2, 2015.

== Composition ==
"Week End"
A sample of the intro to "Week End". It is a pop-like dance song with elements of black music genres such as R&B, soul, and disco. Reviewers praised the song's sound as exciting.

"Week End" is 4 minutes and 30 seconds long. The song was written, arranged, and produced by Hoshino, who also provided vocals and handclapping. It features Ryosuke Nagaoka on electric guitar, Hama Okamoto on bass, Hajime Kobayashi on Wurlitzer piano, Noriyasu Kawamura on drums and cowbell, and Eiko Ishibashi on synthesizer and background vocals. An ensemble of nine play violin and viola on the track, and the sound of wind instruments is incorporated via trumpet, trombone, and tenor saxophone. Takahiro Uchida is credited as mastering engineer.

Musically, "Week End" is a poppy dance song that incorporates elements of black music genres such as R&B. Hoshino's vocals are within the falsetto range, carrying the song through Philadelphia soul-like horn sections. Takanori Kuroda for Cinra described the vocals as between falsetto and Hoshino's natural voice. For the lyrics, Rockin'On Japan's Hirokazu Koike connected lines such as "Ima o odoru subete no hito ni sasagu" / "Kimi dake no dance o seken no floor ni dete sakebe" ("Dedicated to everyone who's dancing now" / "Take your dance onto the world's floor and shout") to Hoshino's live performances, where he often asks the audience to dance freely and loosely without any uniform rhythm. Koike wrote that it refers to how listeners can create a "chaotic frenzy" by achieving "true" freedom.

== Reception ==
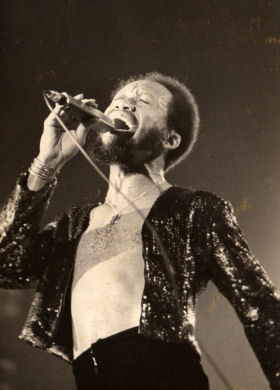
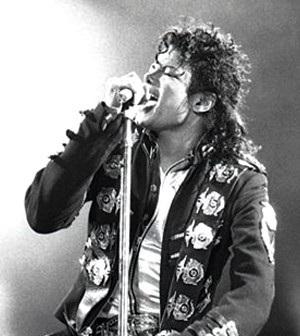
"Week End" was compared to Earth, Wind & Fire's "September" (vocalist Maurice White left) and the Off the Wall era of Michael Jackson (right)

"Week End" was received positively from critics, who praised its sound as energetic; a writer for Rockin'On called the song representative of Yellow Dancer. A reviewer for CDJournal found the track's soul and disco arrangement reminiscent to Earth, Wind & Fire's "September" (1978), whereas Kulture staff likened the song's groove to Off the Wall (1979) era Michael Jackson. Naho Sadahiro of Tower Plus praised "Week End" as a song that makes one want to dance the moment it starts playing, writing that it would seemingly even make standing at a stoplight during a cold work day fun. In an article covering Hoshino and Sakanaction's Ichiro Yamaguchi's impact on J-pop in a series of articles overviewing the genre, a writer for Real Sound felt that "Week End" has the "charm of vibrantly updating the history of Japanese pop", describing the song's overall feel as "sparkly". The CDJournal reviewer praised Hoshino's vocals, opining that, while he illustrates a fun and exciting weekend, his singing is not overly flashy, helping the voice keep a good feeling and giving the song a "stylish" sound.

Prior to the release of Yellow Dancer, "Week End" reached number one on J-Wave's Tokio Hot 100. The song debuted at number 93 on the Billboard Japan Hot 100 chart dated October 28, 2015. It rose to numbers 48, 43, and 29 in the following weeks; upon the release of Yellow Dancer, the song reached its best position on the chart during the week of December 16, when it took number 21. Publishing their year-end charts for 2015, Billboard Japan ranked "Week End" as the 82nd most-aired song of the year. "Week End" saw further airplay success in its second year, ranking as the 47th most-played song on Billboard's year-end list for 2016. In November 2017, "Week End" was certified gold by the Recording Industry Association of Japan (RIAJ) for 100,000 digital sales.

== Live performances ==
External video
- "Week End" (Live at Osaka Jo Hall 2016) – from Yellow Voyage

Hoshino gave a debut performance of "Week End" on November 27, 2015, when he appeared as a guest on the music television program Music Station. Hoshino performed the song on the Yellow Voyage concert tour, the headlining tour for Yellow Dancer. The performance of the song at the Osaka-jō Hall, where it and "Tokiyo" were the final songs before the encore, saw Hoshino moving from one end of the stage to the other as he and his backup dancers "teased the audience into movement, as if turning the venue into a dancefloor", according to an article from Rockin'On. A report by Natalie.mu of the Osaka performance wrote that "Tokiyo" and "Week End" created a happy atmosphere before Hoshino departed the stage. Teppei Kishida, in a different article for Rockin'On, described the song's performance at the Nippon Budokan as "disco time", where the stage was enveloped in "pop magic" from the distinct movements of the attractive but elegant dancers, backed by soft lightning to focus the audience on the quality of the music. In promotion of the tour's video release, Live Tour: Yellow Voyage (2016), the Osaka performance of "Week End" was uploaded to Hoshino's YouTube channel.

Hoshino featured "Week End" as the last song before encore on Yellow Pacific in 2017, a two-day concert. He performed the song in the following Continues (2017) and Live in Japan with Mark Ronson (2018) concerts – as the final song on the latter – and featured it on the setlists for both the domestic and world tour promoting his fifth album Pop Virus (2018). A performance of the song at the Tokyo Dome saw Hoshino dancing across the catwalk as he instigated a sing-along with the audience. During the world tour's stop at Yokohama Arena, Hoshino sang "Week End" alongside Ronson on guitar. Subsequently, Hoshino performed the song for Ronson's Love Lockdown: Video Mixtape project in 2020, a livestream promoting social distancing during the COVID-19 pandemic. In 2019, Hoshino performed "Week End" and "Pop Virus" at the Space Shower Music Awards after receiving the awards for Artist of the Year, People's Choice, Album of the Year, and Best Pop Artist, the most awards taken by an artist in the ceremony's history. For festival and other appearances, Hoshino has performed "Week End" at the Metropolitan Rock Festival, Viva La Rock, Rock in Japan, and Victor Rock Festival in 2016; at the online Soundwave concert, broadcast via Fortnite, in 2022; and at the Summer Sonic Festival in 2023.

== Personnel ==
Credits adapted from Apple Music.

- Gen Hoshino – vocals, handclaps, songwriter, producer
- Ryosuke Nagaoka – electric guitar
- Hama Okamoto – bass guitar
- Eiko Ishibashi – synthesizer, background vocals
- Hajime Kobayashi – Wurlitzer piano
- Noriyasu Kawamura – drums, cowbell
- Satoru Takeshima – tenor saxophone
- Atsuki Yumoto – trumpet
- Tatsuhiko Yoshizawa – trumpet
- Nobuhide Handa – trombone
- Mio Okamura – violin
- Yu Sugino – violin
- Akane Irie – violin
- Osamu Iyoku – violin
- Kazuo Watanabe – violin
- Shohei Yoshida – violin
- Miho Shimokawa – violin
- Kaoru Hagiwara – viola
- Reiichi Tateizumi – viola
- Takahiro Uchida – mastering engineer

== Charts ==
=== Weekly charts ===
Weekly chart performance for "Week End" (2015–16)
Chart (2015–16)	Peak position
Japan (Billboard Japan Hot 100)	21

=== Year-end charts ===
Year-end chart performance for "Week End" (2015)
Chart (2015)	Position
Japanese Radio Songs (Billboard Japan)	82

Year-end chart performance for "Week End" (2016)
Chart (2016)	Position
Japanese Radio Songs (Billboard Japan)	47

== Certifications ==
Certifications for "Week End"
Region	Certification	Certified units/sales
Japan (RIAJ)	Gold	100,000^{*}
^{*} Sales figures based on certification alone.

== Release history ==
Release dates and formats for "Week End"
Region	Date	Format	Label	Ref(s).
Japan	October 20, 2015	Radio airplay	Unknown	
