= Tokiyo =

2015 song by Gen Hoshino

Song by Gen Hoshino

from the album Yellow Dancer
- Language: Japanese
- Written: 2015
- Released: December 2, 2015
- Genre: J-pop
- Length: 4:15
- Label: Speedstar
- Songwriter: Gen Hoshino
- Producer: Gen Hoshino

Music video
- "Tokiyo" on YouTube

"Tokiyo" (Japanese: 時よ; lit. 'Time') (Japanese pronunciation: [tokiꜜ jo]) is a song by Japanese singer-songwriter and musician Gen Hoshino from his fourth studio album, Yellow Dancer (2015). The song was written and produced by Hoshino as a commercial song for the distance learning program U-CAN. The album's opening track is an upbeat pop song centered on synthesizer with a prevalent string arrangement, featuring a more Japanese sound on an album with heavy influences from black music. The song's lyrics reference the passing of time, with a forward-facing message on the lack of meaning in life. Written at the start of 2015, Hoshino drew influence from Yellow Magic Orchestra's "Mad Pierrot" (1978) and utilized kigo in the lyrics to represent the four seasons.

"Tokiyo" was received positively by album reviewers, who enjoyed its poppy composition. The song peaked at number 21 on the Billboard Japan Hot 100, with 19 chart weeks, and received a gold certification from the Recording Industry Association of Japan (RIAJ) for digital sales. An accompanying music video was directed by Kazuaki Seki and filmed at Shōnandai Station in Fujisawa, Kanagawa. It features Hoshino dressed as a train conductor, performing choreography alongside a masked female dancer. The song was debuted live during the Yellow Voyage tour promoting Yellow Dancer, with Elevenplay performing the music video's choreography. In the 2017 Continues tour – a tour themed around connecting music history – it was performed after a cover of "Mad Pierrot", representing the theme.

== Background and writing ==
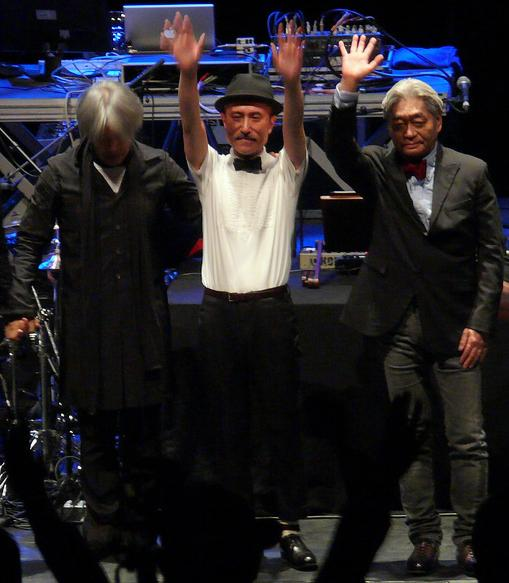
"Tokiyo" was inspired by "Mad Pierrot" (1978) by Yellow Magic Orchestra (pictured).

Hoshino announced Yellow Dancer, his fourth studio album, on October 14, 2015. He initially only revealed select songs from its track listing, such as singles or previously previewed commission songs like the Mezamashi Saturday theme song "Week End". "Tokiyo" was announced alongside the full track listing on October 28. It was placed as the album's lead track, followed by "Week End". Seven days after the release of Yellow Dancer by Speedstar Records on December 2, 2015, it was announced that "Tokiyo" would appear in a commercial for the distance learning program U-CAN starting January 9, 2016, with Hoshino to also star in-person.

Hoshino wrote and produced "Tokiyo". Along its announcement as a U-CAN song, Hoshino commented that he wanted the song to represent the inevitable passing of time, as well as the strength and emotions of people who live in it. He wrote it at the start of 2015, with "Mad Pierrot" (1978) by Yellow Magic Orchestra as a major influence. Hoshino envisioned an analog synthesizer sound alongside a stringed melody, with percussions brought out by the synth. He constructed the lyrics simultaneously with his acting role as an obstetrician on the television drama Dr. Storks (2015–17), which he thought was an unconscious influence; for example in the second verse with the word aka-chan (lit. "baby"). Hoshino wanted to represent all four seasons of the year in the lyrics and researched various kigo, literally meaning seasonal words. He highlighted the third verse's "Yūdachi ni nureta kimi o" ("How you got drenched in a sudden evening shower"), in which yūdachi (lit. "evening shower") represents summer. The song's ending with "bye-bye!" was imagined in a light-hearted meaning, similarly to someone saying goodbye to a person they will see again next week.

== Composition and lyrics ==
"Tokiyo"
A sample to the song's final chorus. An upbeat pop song, "Tokiyo" features an electronic sound through synthesizer alongside a prevalent string section on violin, viola, and cello. Music critics analyzed the lyrics as forward-facing with references to the reasonless passing of time.

"Tokiyo" has a runtime of 4 minutes and 15 seconds. It is set in a fast tempo of 176 beats per minute and primarily composed in the key of F major with a switch to G-flat major in the ending, according to sheet music published by Yamaha Music Entertainment. Hoshino performs on vocals and guitar, with Eiko Ishibashi featuring on synthesizer and background vocals, Ryosuke Nagaoka on electric guitar, Hama Okamoto on bass, and Noriyasu Kawamura on drums and cowbell. An ensemble of ten conducted by regular collaborator Mio Okamura plays violin, viola, and cello. Takahiro Uchida is credited as the track's mastering engineer.

Musically, "Tokiyo" is an upbeat, pop song centered on the electric sound of Ishibashi's synthesizer, backed by Okamura's prevalent string arrangement and Hoshino's fast-paced vocals. It has a more Japanese style in comparison to other tracks on the heavily black music-inspired album. Takanori Kuroda for Cinra described the synth as oriental and reminiscent to the electronic music of early-era Yellow Magic Orchestra, and CDJournal reviewers found the track's melody Japanese-like. Tomoyuki Mori, analyzing Yellow Dancer for Real Sound, felt that the song's flat beat, hard bassline, and "crazy" stringed instrumentation provided a different perspective of the album's concept of "black-based yellow music", whereas Tower Plus reviewer Naho Sadahiro identified "Tokiyo" as without audible black music influence. Akimasa Munekata, also a writer at Real Sound, wrote that "Tokiyo" had a different impression than standard rock music, with a guitar that rarely appears at the front of the sound.

The lyrics to "Tokiyo" are forward-facing with a message of time passing without meaning, matched by the song's fast melody, according to analysis from reviewers at CDJournal. Mori at Real Sound held a similar interpretation, analyzing the line "Toki yo, bokura nosete" / "Tsuzuiteku, imi mo naku" ("Time goes on, moving us forward" / "Without meaning") as a comparison of the lack of particular deep meaning in life to the reasonless passing of time. Sadahiro noted the lyrics' allusion to the four seasons and felt that the final line of "bye-bye!" contrasted to earlier lyrics such as "Ugoki dase, hari o mawase" / "Tsugi no kimi ni tsungare" ("Move and rotate the hands of the clock" / "So that it will lead to your next self"). The song connects to "Friend Ship", the final song on Yellow Dancer, which reintroduces an oriental sound with focus on a synthesizer. Sadahiro noted a lyrical connection between the tracks, with "bye-bye!" matching to "Itsuka mata aeru kana" ("Maybe we will meet again someday"), the final line on "Friend Ship".

== Reception ==
"Tokiyo" was received positively by album reviewers. Real Sound's Mori wrote that the song gives a taste of Hoshino's specialty in "crazy stringed sound" and called its "blunt" lyrics the true essence of Gen Hoshino. A short review of Yellow Dancer by Hirama of Tower Records praised the melody on "Tokiyo" as catchy, and highlighted its track order with "Week End" and "Sun". Tomoko Ishisumi of Skream! magazine felt that "Tokiyo", the acoustic "Kuchizuke", and the instrumental "Nerd Strut" – featuring a bass guitar performance from Yellow Magic Orchestra's Haruomi Hosono – formed a "distinct point" in the album. A review of the song by the staff of CDJournal described "Tokiyo" as a good-feeling pop tune with a memorable Japanese-style melody, featuring a warm tone provided by the string section.

Commercially, "Tokiyo" opened on Billboard Japan's Hot 100 chart dated December 9, 2015, placing at number 62. It reached its best position during the week of January 13, 2016, when it rose to number 21. In total, it charted for 19 weeks, making its final appearance on the chart dated January 18, 2017. In February 2017, "Tokiyo" was certified gold by the Recording Industry Association of Japan (RIAJ) for 100,000 digital sales.

== Music video ==
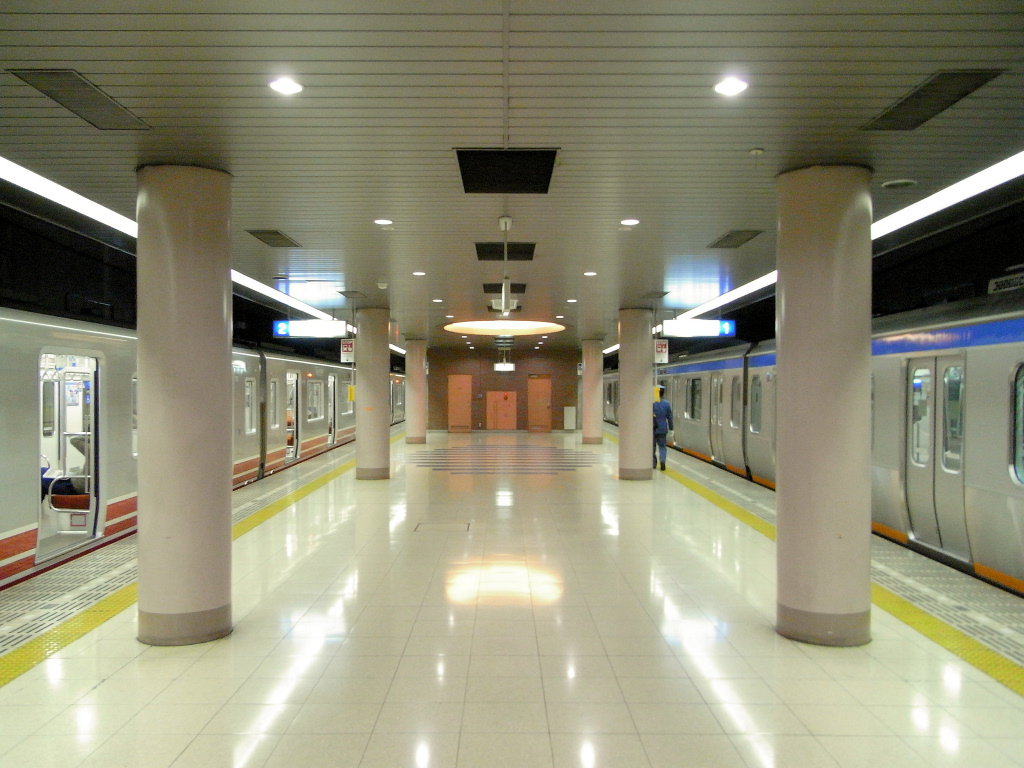
The music video to "Tokiyo" was filmed at Shōnandai Station in Fujisawa, Kanagawa.

Kazuaki Seki – who had previously been in charge of the video for the album's single "Sun" (2015) – directed the music video for "Tokiyo", which released on November 30, 2015. It features Hoshino dressed as a train conductor and an uncredited, masked female dancer (Note: The booklet included with Hoshino's video album Music Video Tour 2010–2017 lists the cast to "Tokiyo" as "secret" (内緒, naisho).) performing together. The duo appear at the railway platform and paid area of an empty metro station, with choreographic references to railway crossings and the salutes of conductors. According to an official location guide published by Sagami Railway, the music video was filmed at Shōnandai Station in Fujisawa, Kanagawa, Japan. Originally, the video was intersected by an album trailer advertising the limited edition DVD contents of Yellow Dancer; however, in 2024, this advertisement (and onces on other videos by Hoshino) were removed, alongside the addition of toggleable audio commentary by Hoshino and his frequent video collaborator Santa Yamagishi. Instead, the commercial was compiled onto the video "First-Run Limited-Edition DVD Trailer Collection".

The video was received positively by critics. Rockin'On Japan's Tomohiro Ogawa listed it amongst Hoshino's top ten music videos, calling it "catchy" and encapsulating of the song's poppy style with camera movements that match its feeling of rush. Ogawa felt it was "typical [of] Hoshino" to include a bit of grotesqueness, noting the dimly lit subway and masked female dancer. Hirama of Tower Records Japan praised the video within his review of Yellow Dancer, writing that it would put listeners' hearts into movement. Haruka Wakada at Real Sound wrote that the video continues a theme from the "Sun" music video of turning everyday locations into dance stages.

== Live performances ==
Hoshino performed "Tokiyo" during his Yellow Voyage tour, the headlining tour for Yellow Dancer, and featured it on the live video album Live Tour: Yellow Voyage (2016). On setlists, it was the final song before the encore. He performed the song's choreography alongside dance troupe Elevenplay, ending with confetti shot across the stage as Hoshino moved to salute. Nobuaki Ozura for Excite Japan praised the choreography, writing it "far surpasses the realms of possible imitation". A report of the Osaka-jō Hall performance by Natalie.mu staff opined that "Tokiyo" and "Week End" created a happy atmosphere before Hoshino departed the stage in preparation for the encore. During the second and final day of Hoshino's Yellow Pacific concert in February 2017, "Tokiyo" was featured as the second of three songs on the encore. Alongside a cover of Akira Fuse's "Kimi wa Bara yori Utsukushī" (1979), Hoshino performed the song as his alter ego character Akira Nise, his first time singing two songs as the character. Again dancing to the music video's choreography, Hoshino sang the song with a louder and longer tone, indicative of Nise.

Hoshino's 2017 tour Continues the theme of connecting music history was inspired by the influence of "Mad Perriot" on "Tokiyo". Setlists opened with Martin Denny's "Firecracker" (1959), the song which inspired Yellow Magic Orchestra's Hosono to form the band and subsequently write "Mad Pierrot" on their eponymous debut album. Hoshino sang "Mad Pierrot" as the concert's twelfth song, moving directly into a performance of "Tokiyo" alongside Elevenplay. Real Sound's Haruka Wakada felt that the song's lyrics were announcing of the concert's theme. During the 2019 dome tour promoting his fifth album Pop Virus (2018), Hoshino sang "Tokiyo" during an encore after a closing introduction of his touring members. Singing, Hoshino performed the song's choreography in symmetry to Akira Nise, played by dancer Shingo Okamoto. Performances of the song were included on the respective video releases, Live Tour: Continues (2017) and Dome Tour: Pop Virus at Tokyo Dome (2019).

== Personnel ==
Music and production credits adapted from Apple Music; music video staff adapted from the booklet to Music Video Tour 2010–2017.

Performance and production personnel

- Gen Hoshino – vocals, guitar, songwriter, producer
- Ryosuke Nagaoka – electric guitar
- Hama Okamoto – bass guitar
- Eiko Ishibashi – synthesizer, background vocals
- Noriyasu Kawamura – drums, cowbell
- Mio Okamura – violin
- Yu Sugino – violin
- Kiyo Kido – violin
- Osamu Iyoku – violin
- Miho Shimokawa – violin
- Motoko Fujiie – violin
- Mikiyo Kikuchi – viola
- Reiichi Tateizumi – viola
- Ayano Kasahara – cello
- Toshiyuki Muranaka – cello
- Takahiro Uchida – mastering engineer

Music video staff

- Kazuaki Seki – director
- Takahiko Kajima – producer
- Masatoshi Toyono – cameraman
- Ryōhei Watanabe – lighting
- Saki Nakamura – production designer
- Mikiko – choreography
- Takakusagi Go – hair, make-up for Hoshino
- Takako Uchiyama – hair, make-up for cast
- Hidero Nakagane – styling

== Charts ==
Weekly chart performance for "Tokiyo" (2015–17)
Chart (2015–17)	Peak position
Japan (Billboard Japan Hot 100)	21

== Certifications ==
Certifications for "Tokiyo"
Region	Certification	Certified units/sales
Japan (RIAJ)	Gold	100,000^{*}
^{*} Sales figures based on certification alone.
