= Koi (song) =

Single by Gen Hoshino

from the album Pop Virus
- Language: Japanese
- B-side: "Drinking Dance"; "Continues"; "Amaoto" (House ver.)
- Released: 5 October 2016
- Recorded: 2016
- Genre: J-pop; soul; smooth jazz
- Length: 4:13
- Label: Victor; Speedstar
- Songwriter: Gen Hoshino
- Producer: Gen Hoshino

Gen Hoshino singles chronology
"Sun" (2015)	"Koi" (2016)	"Family Song" (2017)

Music video
- "Koi" on YouTube

"Koi" (Japanese: 恋; lit. Love) is a Japanese pop song by singer-songwriter Gen Hoshino. It was released on 5 October 2016 through Victor Entertainment and Speedstar Records as Hoshino's ninth single. The song's lyrics are about the changing nature and diversity of love, and the many definitions it has as society and time evolves.

The song followed Hoshino's previous single, Sun. Due to its popularity, Hoshino initially felt pressure to meet perceived high expectations in his next work. Hoshino wanted to write a song that redefined the concept of "love" from the traditional structure of a man and a woman in a marriage. The song also served as the theme song for the TBS television series The Full-Time Wife Escapist, in which he starred alongside Yui Aragaki. The director of the drama sought for a song that was easy to dance to, which Hoshino also had envisioned.

The song was well received in Japan and was a commercial success. It debuted at number two on the Oricon Singles Chart and the Billboard Japan Hot 100, later reaching number one within a week. At the Japan Gold Disc Award, the song won song of the year. The song sold more than 2.3 million copies in the country.

Sparking the viral "Koi Dance," which was choreographed by Mikiko Mizuno, the song was socially influential in Japan. Taking three months to choreograph, the dance along with the song was featured in the end credits of each episode of The Full-Time Wife Escapist. The song and the dance were featured in a Fornite event, and a band cover was featured in a Sound! Euphonium film. The song and dance became a notable piece of Japanese pop culture phenomena in the 21st century.

== Background and release ==
Due to the success of Hoshino's previous single, Sun, there was a lot of pressure building around his next work. Hoshino worried everyday that if his next song did not meet expectations, he would be regarded as a one-hit wonder. However, he eventually disregarded the mindset, instead seeking to focus on producing a work that he personally found joy in. Initially, he was not happy with the result of the song, citing his lack of excitement. While in the bathroom, Hoshino thought to increase the tempo and make the song faster. Satisfied with the change, his tweak led Hoshino to create the song he had envisioned. Hoshino was also keen on making a song that he could be excited by and dance to, while also being distinguishable from his previous album Yellow Dancer. The song's title was chosen as "Koi" as Hoshino believed it was a uniquely Japanese term citing that though the song's title is can be translated as "Love" in English, the more fitting word in English is "Ai" (愛), rather than "Koi" (恋).

== Composition and lyrics ==
"Koi" runs at a tempo of 158 BPM, with a time signature of 4/4. The song is in the A key. The song is described as being a "Japanese interpretation of soul music and funk."

The song's lyrics narrate that love is a wide spectrum and not reserved for particular things. In an interview with Yoshiaki Takahashi on TBS Radio, Hoshino says the song is about various types of love, including love for the same sex, opposite sex, and even fictional characters. He believed that the diversity of how people loved had been growing and that old definitions of love had become outdated and were being redefined. He stated his appreciation for people who love stories and fictional worlds, wondering how different someone loving something that didn't actually exist was from conventional love. He sought to portray this growing diversity with the lyric fuufu wo koete yuke (夫婦を超えてゆけ; lit. Transcend a married couple). Takahashi noted that the song took into account the growing movement of LGBTQ+ understanding in Japan and what sort of love song was needed in the era.

The lyric kimi no moto e kaerunda (君の元へ帰るんだ; lit. I'm returning home to you) was based off an experience in which Hoshino visited an old apartment building. Hoshino said that he enjoys the smell of food in the home, despite not knowing what was being cooked; due to his being busy at the time, he said that the smell gave him a sense of peace and liberation.

== Reception ==
=== Critical reception ===
"Koi" was well received by critics. Tomoyuki Mori of Real Sound praised the song and its blend of Black music and Japanese Pop. He also praised the lyrics, regarding its take on marriage and romance as a "fresh perspective that could appeal to all audiences" and anticipated his rising to become a national icon. Takayuki Ishiguro writing for Joshi SPA! praised the musicians of the song as highly skilled musicians. He noted that the song's lyrics and melody yielded a soft and poppy feel and perceived that the song learned a lot from Western music to create a hybrid song that was "pastoral yet sharp." Of the guitar phase that begins after the last vocals, he believed that it added a repetition of intricate yet rapid movements. Though the notes themselves lacked a message to convey, he found them fun and felt like humming along. He compared the song's romance-themed lyrics and difficult choreography to Babymetal. Billboard JAPAN compared the song to Utada Hikaru's song "Hanataba wo Kimi ni," stating that despite the two songs' melodies and backgrounds being vastly different, both of them deal with things people will eventually face at some point in their lives. He believed that though the songs were serious and heavy, they were easy to get into as it was those two things while still being a pop song. He connected the two songs to kayokyoku, believing that the genre had become its own thing while still being influenced by Western music.

=== Commercial performance ===
"Koi" was a commercial success in Japan. The single debuted at number two on the Oricon Singles Chart and the Billboard Japan Hot 100 chart, before peaking at number one on the Japan Hot 100 the week after, becoming Hoshino's first number one song on the Japan Hot 100 chart. Since then, it has topped the chart for a total of 11 non-consecutive weeks and has spent 136 weeks on the chart as of February 2021, making it the song with most weeks at number one and the ninth for most weeks on the chart. It won Song of the Year by Download at the 31st Japan Gold Disc Award, and topped the Japan Hot 100-year-end list in 2017. The CD single has been certified Platinum by the Recording Industry Association of Japan (RIAJ), while the song has been certified Million. Overall, it has sold over 2.3 million copies in Japan.

== Music video ==
The accompanying music video was released to Hoshino's official YouTube page on 20 September 2016. The music video was directed by Kazuaki Seki, who was also responsible for directing music videos Hoshino's previous songs such as SUN and Tokiyo. The music video features Hoshino and Elevenplay dancers primarily on a rotating, checkered, circular rotating platform with predominantly yellow furniture. Dance moves, commonly known as the "Koi Dance," were choreographed by Perfume choreographer Mikiko Mizuno. To date, the music video has been viewed over 280 million times on YouTube.

== Legacy ==
=== Koi Dance ===
The "Koi Dance" was performed by The Full-Time Wife Escapist cast at the end of every episode. The dance became popular in Japan and has since been widely covered on YouTube and social media. Though the dance spans a minute long, choreography took three months to complete from the initial stages. The director of the drama, Hiroshi Togeta, did not want to impose many restrictions on Hoshino's songwriting process, although he envisioned a song that could be danced to. Hoshino also had a similar vision, so the process was smooth.

The dance became a popular phenomenon in Japan. In an article for the Sankei Shimbun, Doshisha Women's University professor Takahiko Kageyama commented on the dancing, saying that dance had become more familiar to the public, and that it worked with Hoshino's song in particular because it was excellent and the by-product of a drama with a great story. Subsequently, according to a survey conducted by WiseWorks Project between 14 November to 13 December 2016, the cumulative number of viewers for the top 100 videos on YouTube containing the words "Koi Dance" and "Dance Cover" was more than 80 million.

=== In other media ===
On 9 June 2022, as part of the video game Fortnite's Soundwave Series events, the song was featured in a Gen Hoshino concert for the game along with five other songs of his. The "Koi Dance" was also available as an in-concert emote. In 2026, the song was given a brass band cover in the opening sequence of a Sound! Euphonium film.

== Track listing ==
All tracks are written by Gen Hoshino.

CD, digital download
No.	Title	Length
1.	"Koi" (恋)	4:13
2.	"Drinking Dance"	3:40
3.	"Continues"	4:26
4.	"Amaoto" (雨音; House version)	4:01
Total length:		16:20

Limited edition DVD "Koi Video"
No.	Title	Length
1.	"Special Program "Nise Akira, Ishigakijima e Iku""
2.	"Metrock 2016 Live Footage"
3.	"Commentary by Hoshino Gen and Friends"
Total length:		63:00

== Charts ==
=== Weekly charts ===
Chart (2016)	Peak position
Japan Hot 100 (Billboard)	1
Japan Singles Chart (Oricon)	2

Chart (2019)	Peak position
Billboard Japan Streaming	19

=== Year-end charts ===
Chart (2016)	Position
Japan Hot 100 (Billboard)	3
Japan Singles Chart (Oricon)	32

Chart (2017)	Position
Japan Hot 100 (Billboard)	1
Japan Singles Chart (Oricon)	48

Chart (2018)	Position
Japan Hot 100 (Billboard)	46
Japan Digital Songs Chart (Oricon)	47

Chart (2019)	Position
Japan Hot 100 (Billboard)	95

=== All-time charts ===
Chart (2008–2022)	Position
Japan (Japan Hot 100)	5

== Sales and certifications ==
Region	Certification	Certified units/sales
Japan (RIAJ) physical sales	Platinum	318,017
Japan (RIAJ) digital sales	2× Million	2,000,000^{*}
Streaming
Japan (RIAJ)	Silver	30,000,000^{†}
^{*} Sales figures based on certification alone.^{†} Streaming-only figures based on certification alone.

== Release history ==
Country	Date	Format	Label	Ref.
Japan	5 October 2016	CD; digital download	Victor; Speedstar	
Worldwide	5 October 2016	Digital download	Victor; Speedstar	

== See also ==
- List of best-selling singles in Japan
- List of Hot 100 number-one singles of 2016 (Japan)
- List of Hot 100 number-one singles of 2017 (Japan)
- List of songs by Gen Hoshino
- Gen Hoshino discography
