= Live Tour: Yellow Voyage =

2016 live album by Gen Hoshino

Video (live) by Gen Hoshino
- Released: June 22, 2016
- Recorded: March 21, 2016
- Venue: Osaka-jō Hall, Osaka, Japan
- Length: 2:56:00
- Language: Japanese
- Label: Speedstar

Gen Hoshino video chronology
Two Beat in Yokohama Arena (2015)	Live Tour: Yellow Voyage (2016)	Music Video Tour 2010–2017 (2017)

Live Tour: Yellow Voyage (Japanese pronunciation: [ɾaibɯtsɯꜜaː ieɾoːbojaꜜːdʑi]) is the third live video album by Japanese singer-songwriter and musician Gen Hoshino, released on June 22, 2016, via Speedstar Records. Alongside a tour documentary, the album features Hoshino's performance at Osaka-jō Hall during his Yellow Voyage tour, promoting his fourth studio album Yellow Dancer (2015). Issued in both DVD and Blu-ray versions, the video album was promoted with two performances uploaded to YouTube and received both standard and limited releases, with limited prints coming bundled with a booklet. Live Tour: Yellow Voyage reached number one on Oricon's DVD, Blu-ray, and music video charts, and was certified Gold by the Recording Industry Association of Japan (RIAJ).

== Background ==
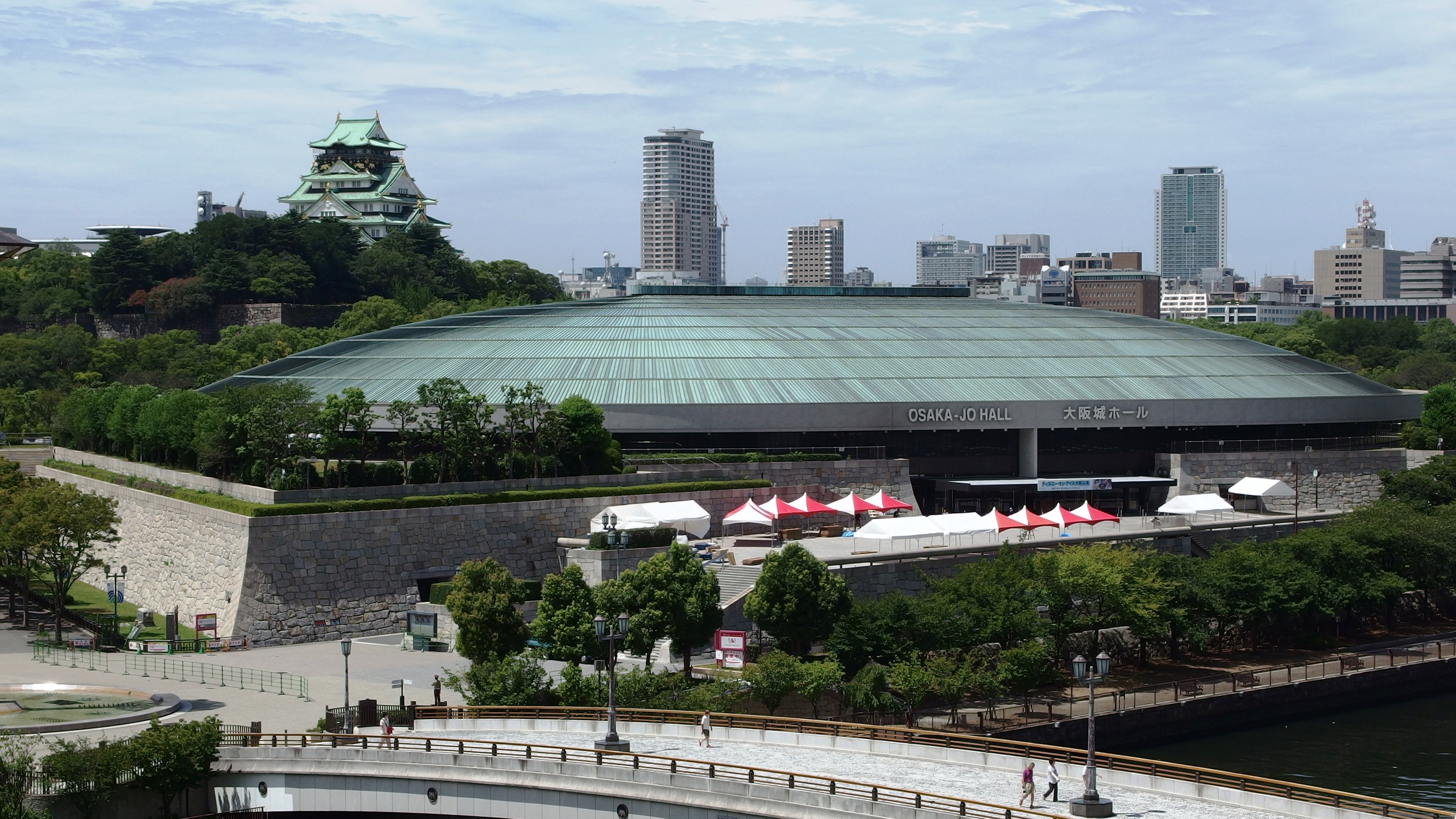
The Osaka-jō Hall in 2014

Japanese singer-songwriter and musician Gen Hoshino released his fourth studio album, Yellow Dancer, on December 2, 2015. His first album in two and a half years since Stranger (2013), Yellow Dancer focused on incorporating black music genres such as soul, jazz, R&B, and jump blues into Hoshino's previous sound whilst trying to maintain a Japanese pop style, for a result Hoshino described as "yellow music". The album was commercially successful in Japan; it reached the top spot on both the Oricon Albums and Billboard Japan's Hot Albums charts and was certified Platinum by the Recording Industry Association of Japan (RIAJ) within a month of release.

Alongside the album's announcement on October 14, 2015, Hoshino revealed an accompanying national touring effort, the Hoshino Gen Live Tour 2016: Yellow Voyage, with 11 shows. Two more dates, at the Tokyo Nippon Budokan and Osaka-jō Hall, were later added to the performance list. The Yellow Voyage tour began at the Nitori Culture Hall in Sapporo, Hokkaido, on January 9, 2016, and ended at the Osaka-jō Hall on March 21. The final performance was seen by an attendance of roughly 100,000.

== Promotion and release ==
On May 17, 2016, Hoshino announced that the Osaka-jō Hall performance of Yellow Voyage would be released as a DVD and Blu-ray video album, titled Live Tour: Yellow Voyage. On the first disc, it would include the show's 21 performances; among the track listing were all songs from Yellow Dancer minus "Yoru", a cover of Crazy Cats' "Sūdara Bushi", and a cover of Akira Fuse's "Kimi wa Bara yori Utsukushi" by Hoshino's alter ego character Akira Fuse. The second disc would feature Odoru, Ima (踊る、今; lit. "Now, Dance"), a 45-minute documentary to the entire tour, and audio commentary from Hoshino and his collaborators were to be included for both discs.

In promotion of the release, the album's performances of Yellow Dancer song "Week End" and Hoshino's debut single "Kudaranai no Naka ni" were uploaded to YouTube. Live Tour: Yellow Voyage was released by Speedstar Records in regular and limited editions in both DVD and Blu-ray formats on June 22, 2016. The limited editions included a special booklet containing interviews with Hoshino and a conversation between him and choreographer Mikiko.

== Reception ==
The live album was received positively by Japanese critics. Rockin'On Japan's Shōichi Miyake, who had viewed two of the tour's shows before watching the album, described the tour as composed of "luxurious arrangement and direction", reflecting "Hoshino's serious love for music". He called Live Tour: Yellow Voyage a monumental release for Hoshino, highlighting his evolution as an artist and proving him as an entertainer. Shinji Hyogo for Real Sound wrote in an article about the album that the tour prioritized music over flashy effects and a video jockey style, which he felt fit with Yellow Dancer's black music themes; instead of utilizing newer technologies and trends, he found the tour's set was simple and constructed with dancers and orchestra as enhancements of its entertainment value. Hamaguchi at Tower Records Japan recalled that finishing the DVD felt like he had been at a concert hall, writing that he was surprised to have been so entertained by watching a video at home.

Commercially, Live Tour: Yellow Voyage debuted at number one on Oricon's weekly DVD and Blu-ray charts dated July 4, 2016—Hoshino's first time on top of these charts—and also reached first place on the combined DVD and Blu-ray music ranking. In total, it charted for 64 weeks on the DVD chart and 54 on the Blu-ray ranking. In January 2017, the album was certified Gold by the RIAJ for 100,000 sales, becoming Hoshino's first video album to receive a certification.

== Track listing ==
All tracks are written by Gen Hoshino expect where otherwise noted.

Disc one

1. "Why Don't You Play in Hell?"
2. "Bakemono"
3. "Yuge"
4. "Down Town"
5. "Step"
6. "Miss You"
7. "Soul"
8. "Yume no Soto e"
9. "Crazy Crazy"
10. "Ichiryū Musician kara no O Iwai Message"
11. "Kuse no Uta"
12. "Kuchizuke"
13. "Sūdara Bushi" (Yukio Aoshima, Hiroaki Hagiwara)
14. "Kudaranai no Naka ni"
15. "Nerd Strut"
16. "Sakura no Mori"
17. "Snow Men"
18. "Sun"
19. "Week End"
20. "Toki yo"
21. "Kimi wa Bara yori Utsukushi" (Kenji Kadoya, Mickie Yoshino)
22. "Friend Ship"

Total length: 2:11:00

Disc two

1. "Yellow Voyage Tour Documentary: Odoru, Ima"

Total length: 45:00

== Charts ==
Weekly chart performance for Live Tour: Yellow Voyage (2016)
Chart (2016)	Peak position
Japanese DVDs (Oricon)	1
Japanese Blu-ray Discs (Oricon)	1

== Certifications ==
Certifications for Live Tour: Yellow Voyage
Region	Certification	Certified units/sales
Japan (RIAJ)	Gold	100,000^{^}
^{^} Shipments figures based on certification alone.

== Release history ==
Release history for Live Tour: Yellow Voyage
Region	Date	Edition	Format	Label	Catalogue code	Ref.
Japan	June 22, 2016	Standard	DVD	Speedstar Records	VIBL-813~814	
Japan	June 22, 2016	Standard	Blu-ray	Speedstar Records	VIXL-170~171	
Japan	June 22, 2016	Limited	DVD	Speedstar Records	VIZL-985	
Japan	June 22, 2016	Limited	Blu-ray	Speedstar Records	VIZL-984	
