= Crazy Crazy / Sakura no Mori =

2014 single by Gen Hoshino

"Crazy Crazy" / "Sakura no Mori"

Single by Gen Hoshino

from the album Yellow Dancer
- Language: Japanese
- B-side: "Night Troop"; "Umi o Sukū"
- Released: June 11, 2014
- Genre: Rock; J-pop
- Length: 3:36 ("Crazy Crazy"); 5:13 ("Sakura no Mori")
- Label: Speedstar
- Songwriter: Gen Hoshino
- Producer: Gen Hoshino

Gen Hoshino singles chronology
"Why Don't You Play in Hell?" (2013)	"Crazy Crazy" / "Sakura no Mori" (2014)	"Sun" (2015)

Music video and audio
- "Crazy Crazy" (Official Video) on YouTube
- "Sakura no Mori" (Audio) on YouTube

"Crazy Crazy" (Japanese pronunciation: [kɯɾeꜜiʑiː kɯɾeꜜiʑiː]) and "Sakura no Mori" (Japanese: 桜の森; lit. "Cherry Blossom Forest") (Japanese pronunciation: [sakɯɾa no moɾi]) are songs by Japanese singer-songwriter and musician Gen Hoshino, released as double A-sides for his fourth studio album, Yellow Dancer (2015). Both tracks were written and produced by Hoshino; he wrote the lyrics without deep thought, utilizing lines he personally liked without regard for literal meaning. The songs were released as the album's second single by Speedstar Records on June 11, 2014, marking Hoshino's seventh single overall.

Categorized as J-pop and Japanese rock, the single features varied sound throughout its track listing. "Crazy Crazy" was developed from a melancholic melody Hoshino had written in 2013 whilst awaiting surgery for a subarachnoid hemorrhage. The song is a homage to the jazz band Crazy Cats featuring upbeat instrumentation, consisting mostly of piano, bass, and drums, through serious lyrics. In a theme of cherry blossoms, "Sakura no Mori" was written for a spring campaign of the radio station J-Wave. It has a pop and disco sound inspired by Western soul artists, with lyrics that feature double meaning about excitement for spring and an intimate encounter between a man and woman. The single includes two B-sides: the mid-paced night-themed "Night Troop" and the home recorded and acoustic guitar-led "Umi o Sukū".

Both songs were shown on radio before the single's release: the second A-side featured on J-Wave, whereas the first was previewed in full on the TBS Radio program of the comedy duo Bananaman. The double A-side was received positively by critics, who commented on the different musical styles featured on its track listing. Upon release, "Crazy Crazy" / "Sakura no Mori" reached number four on the Oricon Singles Chart and the Billboard Japan Top Singles chart. As individual tracks, "Crazy Crazy" and "Sakura no Mori" both charted within the top ten of the Billboard Adult Contemporary Airplay chart, and respectively reached numbers seven and 55 on the Hot 100. A black-and-white music video for the former, starring Hoshino and the other performing musicians, was released on June 4, 2014. It was a nominee for Video of the Year at the 2015 Space Shower Music Awards. Hoshino gave debut performances of the songs during his Two Beat in Yokohama Arena concert in December 2014 and featured both on his national Yellow Voyage tour throughout 2015. Since his 2017 tour Continues, Hoshino has tended to perform the second part in absence of the first.

== Background and production ==
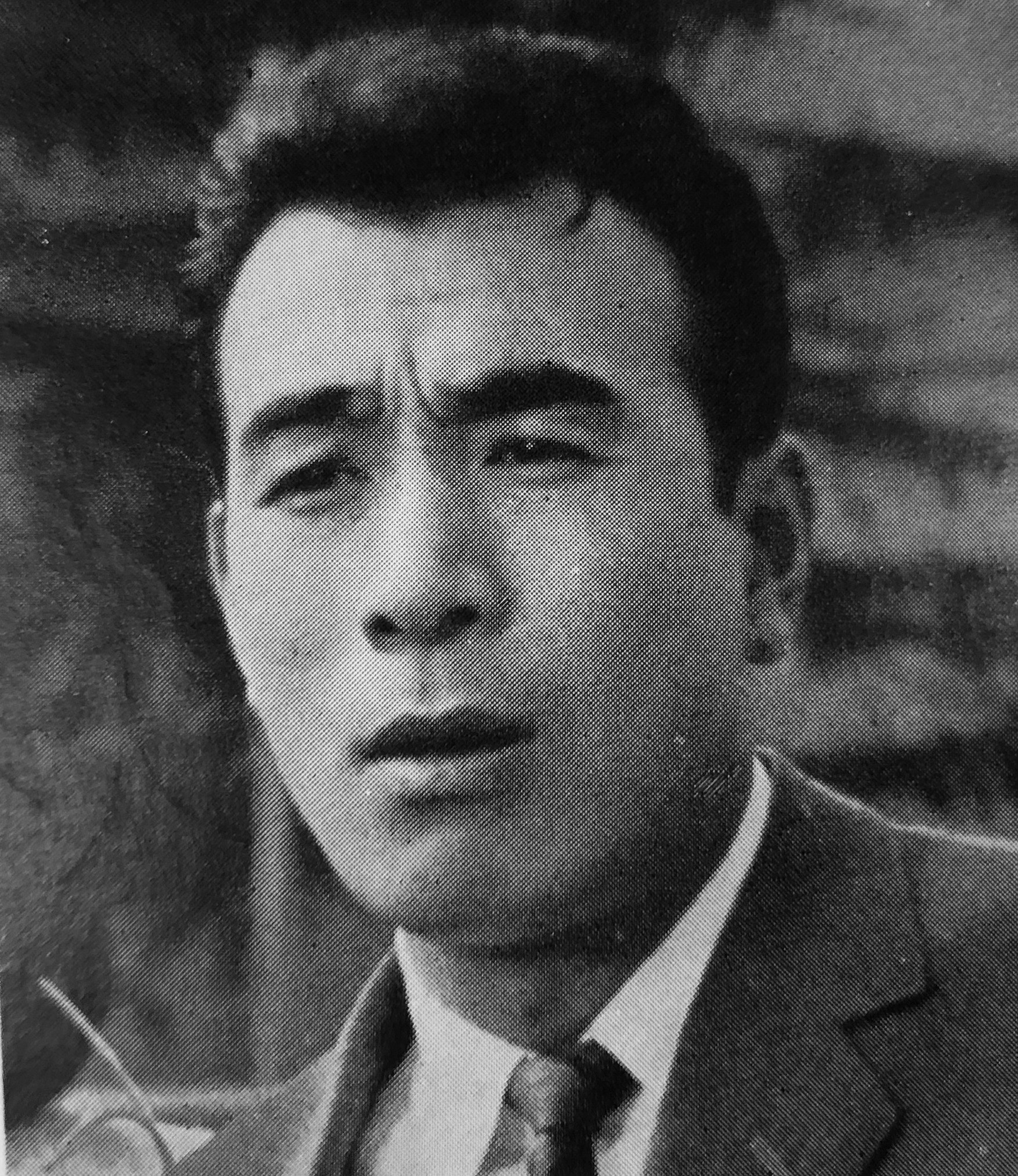
The lyrics to "Crazy Crazy" references members of Crazy Cats, such as Hitoshi Ueki.

Hoshino began writing the melody to "Crazy Crazy" in July 2013 at his home whilst awaiting surgery for a subarachnoid hemorrhage. He described the waiting period as the most difficult in the surgery process, which was reflected by a melancholic ballad style in the song's early draft, similar to his earlier single "Shiranai" (2012). Later, when relistening to old voice memos, Hoshino found the draft and wanted to make it into a lighter style. He imagined forming a trio with formation resembling a black jazz piano player, a heavy metal/white drummer, and a Japanese bassist. When Hoshino returned to activities around the end of 2013, he began work on "Sakura no Mori" simultaneously to "Crazy Crazy". He recruited Ling Tosite Sigure's Masatoshi Nakano for drums, Hama Okamoto of Okamoto's for bass, and Hajime Kobayashi for piano. They held a first rehearsal shortly after.

After adding the word "crazy" into the lyrics, Hoshino became inspired to turn the song into an homage to the Japanese jazz band Crazy Cats, who he had remembered listening to in childhood. He added references to three members of group in the text through kanji; for example, Kei Tani (谷啓) is referenced through 谷 (tani, lit. "valley") and Hitoshi Ueki (植木等) is through 等しい (hitoshī, lit. "equal" as in "equality"). Hoshino conceived part of the song's chord progression and drum timing before production and had initially imagined beginning the track with both melody and chords. In rehearsal with Kobayashi, they attempted to replicate a blues jazz style similar to "what a grandpa would play at a bar in New Orleans". After hearing Kobayashi play the song's chords, Hoshino thought it sounded cool and would be enough on its own, keeping the intro to a piano solo.

Commissioned to create a spring campaign song for the J-Wave radio station, Hoshino wrote "Sakura no Mori" with a cherry blossom theme in mind. On the song, he wanted to attempt a stronger classical dance and J-pop sound. Unlike the jazz inspirations on "Crazy Crazy", "Sakura no Mori" would primarily be influenced by the soul music of Western artists such as Michael Jackson, who Hoshino rediscovered a love for shortly before the start of the double A-side's production. As he researched dance music, Hoshino felt that he began to naturally take use of Japanese scales for a classical Japanese direction as he continued trying to incorporate a rhythm similar to that of soul and R&B groups like the Emotions. Hoshino wrote the lyrics to both tracks without deep thought and utilizing lines he liked regardless of particular literal or grammatical sense, a direction in his writing he noted had become stronger following the album Stranger (2013) and its singles.

== Composition and lyrics ==
"Crazy Crazy"

"Sakura no Mori"
"Crazy Crazy" heads the single with an instrumentally light and upbeat sound through serious lyrics, followed by a spring-reminiscent pop and disco style on "Sakura no Mori".

"Crazy Crazy" / "Sakura no Mori" is categorized under Japanese rock and J-pop on CDJournal. The A-side is headed by "Crazy Crazy" with a runtime of 3 minutes and 56 seconds, followed by the 5 minute and 13 second-long "Sakura no Mori". The B-side features the 3 minute-long tracks "Night Troop" and "Umi o Sukū" (海を掬う, lit. "Scoop the Ocean"; denoted as the house version), for a total runtime of 15 minutes and 46 seconds. Hoshino is credited as songwriter, arranger, producer, and singer on both A-side tracks, whilst Takahiro Uchida is named for master engineering.

"Crazy Crazy" uses a limited instrumental line-up, led by Kobayashi's piano, Okamoto's bass guitar, Nakano's drums, and backed with tambourine played by Hoshino. The song opens with a light and rhythmic piano intro that reminiscences to older theatrical media like slapstick comedy and silent movies. After the intro, the song incorporates the upbeat sounds of drums, handclaps, and a smooth bass line. In its lyrics, "Crazy Crazy" takes use of darker words such as "death" whilst maintaining a forward-facing tone. Saori Yoshiba of Skream! magazine wrote that the vocals and lyrics show Hoshino's seriousness and dark emotions, contrasting to the lively sound of the composition. Oguri of Tower Records Japan called the track's band composition simple and, in certain elements, crazy with the support of a playful tone with the Crazy Cats references in the lyrics and music video.

"Sakura no Mori" sees Kobayashi on a Rhodes piano, Wataru Iga of Benzo on bass guitar, and Daichi Ito on drums. The song introduces stringed instrumentation from cello, violin, and viola to the single, and features extra vocals in the chorus from singer Orarī and Cero members Shōhei Takagi and Yū Arauchi. It is a poppy, dance / disco track, with likeness to acid jazz, and has been associated by critics with the coming of spring. According to analysis by Rockin'On Japan's Marina Watanabe, the lyrics at their surface level describe emotions of excitement at the beginning of spring, but a small change of perspective could twist the text to instead refer to an intimate relation between a man and woman. A reviewer for CDJournal called the lyrics similar to those of fairy tale, with a strange erotic allure.

The first B-side "Night Troop" is a mid-paced track, with funk beat that builds upon blues and jazz genres for a "relaxing" or chilled night theme. Mikiki's Chikako Katō found it reminiscent to neo soul and recent alternative jazz artists such as José James. "Umi o Sukū", the second and final B-side, serves as Hoshino's customary home recording track on the single. It is led by a live acoustic guitar and quiet vocals through a pre-recorded melody.

== Release and promotion ==
On February 20, 2014, it was announced that Hoshino had collaborated with J-Wave to write a song for the radio station's annual spring campaign. The song, "Sakura no Mori", would be Hoshino's first new song after his hemorrhage-induced hiatus, and was first broadcast on-air March 21. After wrapping up the Fukkatsu Live Tour at the NHK Hall on April 9, 2014, Hoshino announced that he would release his first post-recovery single, which would include "Sakura no Mori" and also a video DVD in limited editions. The cover art and final track listing were unveiled May 14: it would be a double A-side of "Crazy Crazy" and "Sakura no Mori" (Hoshino's first double A-side release), backed by "Night Troop" and "Umi o Sukū" on the B-side. Santa Yamagishi was revealed as the director of the first edition DVD, titled Crazy Disc, featuring the special program "Kinkyū Tokubetsu Bangumi: Hoshino Gen Ninki Song Top 10" (緊急特別番組・星野 源 人気ソングTOP10; lit. Urgent Special Program: Gen Hoshino's Top 10 Popular Songs), acoustic live performances of "Barabara" and "Film" from December 2012, a documentary to the single's recording, and accompanying audio commentary from Hoshino and his staff. Copies of the single bought from Tower Records, Tsutaya, HMV, and Yamano Music would come with different postcards of Hoshino's alter ego Akira Nise, with design depending on the store. On May 16, Hoshino previewed "Crazy Crazy" in full for the first time on the TBS Radio show of comedy duo Bananaman, of whom he is a close friend.

A black-and-white music video to "Crazy Crazy" was released on June 4, 2014, directed and edited by Hoshino and starring himself, Kobayashi, and Okamoto wearing white suits as they play their respective instruments. Though Kobayashi played the song's piano alone, the video shows a duet as a reference to Crazy Cats. The video is intercepted by a trailer for Crazy Disc. "Crazy Crazy" / "Sakura no Mori" was released as the second single of Yellow Dancer through the Victor Entertainment label Speedstar Records on June 11, 2014, and marked Hoshino's seventh single. An analog vinyl version of "Sakura no Mori" was released on December 17, 2014, with "Crazy Crazy" and "Night Troop" included on its B-side. Its cover art was illustrated by manga artist Haruko Ichikawa. According to Hoshino, he reached out to Ichikawa asking if she would be interested in creating a motif for "Sakura no Mori"; in response, the artist said she had already planned to, and Hoshino quickly organized the vinyl release idea after seeing two of her rough sketches.

On October 14, 2015, Hoshino announced the title of his fourth studio album, Yellow Dancer, slated for release December 2. The track listing was unveiled on October 28, showing "Sakura no Mori" and "Crazy Crazy" as tracks nine and ten, respectively, surrounded by the instrumental "Nerd Strut" and "Snow Men". The double A-sides are two of four singles on the album, alongside "Why Don't You Play in Hell?" and "Sun".

== Critical reception ==
"Crazy Crazy" / "Sakura no Mori" was met with positive reviews from music critics. Yoshiba, in a web review for Skream!, wrote that the single kept a consistently light and comfortable atmosphere despite the different styles of its track listing, and opined that Hoshino's low-key vocals helped deliver the meaning of the lyrics over the smoother melodies. Yoshiba concluded that the sound is upbeat but not sporadic, feeling that the melancholic and ultimately kind music would "blend [with the] skin" of listeners. Tomoyuki Mori for What's In? felt that the single showed Hoshino attempting "something crazy in middle of the mainstream". Mori called the pop sound on "Crazy Crazy" ecstatic, praising the track for a "surprisingly catchy" melody that plays over the dance instrumentation. Tower Records' Oguri complimented the band composition on "Crazy Crazy" as simple but strong, seeing the jazz piano and thumping drums as particularly "crazy in a good way".

Katō for Mikiki, who had been shown the single before its official release, highlighted "Sakura no Mori" and "Night Troop", calling them a Hoshino-flavored transformation of the disco ("Sakura no Mori") and neo soul ("Night Troop") genres. Oguri of Tower Records noted a style of Japanese emotion on the second A-side, complimenting the track for a catchy rhythm that he called "impossible not to dance to". Watanabe, in a listicle for Rockin'On Japan, named "Sakura no Mori" as one of the seven greatest "deep erotic rock songs", calling the double entendre of its lyrics unique and also alluring.

"Crazy Crazy" and "Sakura no Mori" earned Hoshino two award nominations. The video to "Crazy Crazy" was one of 50 nominees for Video of the Year at the 2015 Space Shower Music Awards, but ultimately lost to Quruli's "Liberty & Gravity". The single's first edition cover art was one of 50 nominees chosen by voters of the Recording Industry Association of Japan (RIAJ) for the 2015 Music Jacket Awards. It was beaten in the second and last round, with Ringo Sheena's Gyakuyunyū: Kōwankyoku declared winner.

== Commercial performance ==
"Crazy Crazy" / "Sakura no Mori" sold 36,390 copies in Japan upon release, taking peaks at number four on both the Billboard Japan Top Singles Sales ranking and the Oricon Singles Chart, behind μ's "Love Wing Bell" / "Dancing Stars on Me!", Tohoshinki's "Sweat" / "Answer", and NEWS' "One: For the Win". It finished as the 14th best-selling single of June according to Oricon with 46,729 units sold, and was named at number 83 on Billboard's year-end physical sales chart for 2014. In total, the single charted for 21 weeks on Oricon's chart (12 weeks consecutive upon release), accumulating 56,565 sales as of April 2018, the single's most recent chart week. The vinyl release charted for one week on the Oricon chart, taking number 35 with 1,887 sales.

Both A-side tracks on the single saw success on adult contemporary airplay. Upon its unveiling in March, "Sakura no Mori" debuted at number 35 on Billboard Japan's Adult Contemporary Airplay Chart and rose to a tied peak at number nine with Yui's "Cherry" the next week, in total charting seven weeks. "Crazy Crazy" debuted at number 17 on May 28 and rose to a peak at number seven on its fourth week. It made a total of eight appearances on the chart, finishing as the 59th most-aired song of 2014 on Billboard's year-end list. Both songs also charted on the Billboard Japan Hot 100: "Sakura no Mori" peaked at number 55 in April and "Crazy Crazy" reached number seven in June.

== Live performances ==
External videos
- "Crazy Crazy" (Live at Osaka Jo Hall 2016) – from Yellow Voyage
- "Sakura no Mori" (Live from "Enkai" 2021); Live performances of "Crazy Crazy" and "Sakura no Mori" on Hoshino's YouTube channel.

Hoshino gave debut live performances of "Crazy Crazy" and "Sakura no Mori" on both the acoustic and band days of his two-day Two Beat in Yokohama Arena concert in December 2014. The acoustic day featured "Sakura no Mori" as the 21st song on the setlist, and "Crazy Crazy" as the first song of the encore. The performance of "Crazy Crazy" broke the acoustic theme, with Okamoto, Nakano, and Kobayashi brought on stage specifically for the song. During the second day, Hoshino performed "Sakura no Mori" immediately before moving to the encore, where he sang a cover of Akira Fuse's "Kimi wa Bara yori Utsukushi" as Akira Nise and ended the concert with "Crazy Crazy". Later the same month, Hoshino performed "Crazy Crazy" alone at the New Year's Count Down TV 14/15 concert. He sang both songs at the Victor Rock Festival in May 2015 and Rock in Japan Festival in August, with "Crazy Crazy" again ending the encores after covers of "Kimi wa Bara yori Utsukushi". Hoshino's next tour, the Hitori Edge in Budokan in August 2015, featured both songs on the set list; the footage was included in limited editions of Yellow Dancer. Upon the release of the album, Hoshino embarked on the Yellow Voyage live tour, performing "Crazy Crazy", "Sakura no Mori", and all other songs from the album.

Hoshino opened 2017 with a two-day concert in February, Yellow Pacific, performing both "Sakura no Mori" and "Crazy Crazy". In the following Continues (2017) and Live in Japan (2018; with Mark Ronson) concerts, Hoshino performed "Sakura no Mori" without "Crazy Crazy". In his 2019 Pop Virus Dome Tour promoting his fifth album Pop Virus, Hoshino again performed "Sakura no Mori" in absence of "Crazy Crazy", playing the track's guitar himself alongside Okamoto on bass. Since, Hoshino has performed "Sakura no Mori" on his Gratitude (2020), Enkai (2021), and Reassembly (2023) concerts, with Gratitude being the only to feature "Crazy Crazy". In 2024, Hoshino performed "Crazy Crazy" before his encore at the Rock in Japan festival, where he did not sing "Sakura no Mori".

== Personnel ==
Credits adapted from CDJournal and Apple Music.

- Gen Hoshino – vocals, handclaps, songwriter, producer (#1–2); tambourine (#1)
- Hajime Kobayashi – piano (#1); Rhodes piano (#2)
- Hama Okamoto – bass guitar (#1)
- Masatoshi Nakano (alternatively credited as Pierrot Nakano) – drums (#1)
- Wataru Iga – bass guitar (#2)
- Daichi Ito – drums (#2)
- Ayano Kasahara – cello (#2)
- Mari Masumoto – cello (#2)
- Mikiko Ise – violin (#2)
- Osamu Iyoku – violin (#2)
- Mio Okamura – violin (#2)
- Yu Sugino – violin (#2)
- Mikiyo Kikuchi – viola (#2)
- Reiichi Tateizumi – viola (#2)
- Shōhei Takagi – chorus vocals (#2)
- Yū Arauchi – chorus vocals (#2)
- Orarī – chorus vocals (#2)
- Takahiro Uchida – mastering engineer (#1–2)

== Track listing ==
All tracks are written by Gen Hoshino.

Regular edition

1. "Crazy Crazy" – 3:36
2. "Sakura no Mori" (桜の森) – 5:13
3. "Night Troop" – 3:27
4. "Umi o Sukū" (海を掬う; House Version) – 3:34

Total length: 13:50

First edition (DVD – Crazy Disc)

1. "Kinkyū Tokubetsu Bangumi: Hoshino Gen Ninki Song Top 10" (緊急特別番組・星野 源 人気ソングTOP10)
2. "Recording Documentary"
3. "Barabara" (Hikigatari) (2012.12.13 at Shibuya Public Hall)
4. "Film" (Hikigatari) (2012.12.13 at Shibuya Public Hall)

Total length: c. 1:17:00

== Charts ==
=== Weekly charts ===
Weekly chart performance for "Crazy Crazy" / "Sakura no Mori" (2014–15)
Chart (2014–15)	Peak position
Japanese Top Singles Sales (Billboard Japan)	4
Japan (Oricon)	4

=== Year-end charts ===
Year-end chart performance for "Crazy Crazy" / "Sakura no Mori" (2014)
Chart (2014)	Position
Japanese Top Singles Sales (Billboard Japan)	83

== Release history ==
Release history for "Crazy Crazy" / "Sakura no Mori"
Region	Date	Edition	Format	Label	Catalogue code	Ref.
Japan	June 11, 2014	Standard	CD	Speedstar Records	VICL-36914	
Japan	June 11, 2014	Limited	CD+DVD	Speedstar Records	VIZL-678	
Japan	June 28, 2014	Standard	Rental CD	Victor Entertainment	VICL-36914R	
Japan	December 17, 2014	Analog	Vinyl	Speedstar Records	VIJL-60140	
Various	June 23, 2015	Standard	Digital download	Speedstar Records	—N/a	
Various	August 30, 2019	Standard	Streaming	Speedstar Records	—N/a	
South Korea	August 30, 2019	Standard	Streaming	J-Box Entertainment	—N/a	

== See also ==
- "Why Don't You Play in Hell?" (song)
