= Yellow Dancer =

- Standard and limited edition cover (Note: The Analog LP release swaps the crimson background with a cherry blossom pink.)

Studio album by Gen Hoshino
- Released: December 2, 2015
- Recorded: 2013–2015
- Genres: J-pop; jazz; soul; contemporary R&B
- Length: 56:27
- Language: Japanese
- Label: Speedstar
- Producer: Gen Hoshino

Gen Hoshino chronology
Stranger (2013)	Yellow Dancer (2015)	Pop Virus (2018)

Singles from Yellow Dancer
- 1. "Why Don't You Play in Hell?" Released: October 2, 2013; 2. "Crazy Crazy" / "Sakura no Mori" Released: June 11, 2014; 3. "Sun" Released: May 27, 2015

Yellow Dancer (Japanese pronunciation: [ieɾoː daꜜɰ̃saː]) is the fourth studio album by Japanese singer-songwriter and musician Gen Hoshino, released by Speedstar Records on December 2, 2015.

== Development ==
=== Background ===
Japanese singer-songwriter and musician Gen Hoshino emerged as a primarily acoustic pop artist with his debut albums Baka no Uta (2010) and Episode (2011). Hoshino's parents were both fans of jazz: his father (a jazz piano hobbyist) and his mother (who at one point aimed to be a jazz vocalist) would together "play modern jazz and R&B every day around the house". With his instrumental band Sakerock formed in 2000, Hoshino performed songs inspired by funk, soul, jazz, and R&B, and experimented with a mixture of Japanese and African-American styles on the B-sides to his singles, such as "Yuge" on "Kudaranai no Naka ni" (2011), "Moshi mo" on "Film" (2012), or "Kisetsu" on "Shiranai" (2013).

Whilst in the process of wrapping up recording for his third album, Hoshino collapsed to a subarachnoid hemorrhage in December 2012. After a three-month hiatus, Stranger was released, which brought his sound into a more up-beat direction through greater use of synthesizer and string sections. Only a week later, he followed Stranger with the non-album rock and roll single "Gag" for the anime film Saint Young Men, but assumed a second hiatus in June after a reinspection discovered a relapse in his hemorrhage. While awaiting the reinspection, Hoshino wrote the lyrics to "Why Don't You Play in Hell?" (地獄でなぜ悪い, Jigoku de Naze Warui; lit. 'What's Bad About Hell?') – the theme song to the Sion Sono film of the same name – and had it released on October 2, 2013, whilst still on hiatus. Hoshino used the song to reconsider his musical roots ("1960s jazz, soul, Motown sound black music") and was his first time incorporating African-American influences on an A-side.

At the start of 2014, Hoshino's recovery was officially commemorated by the conclusion of touring for Stranger in February and the Fukkatsu (lit. 'Revival') Live Tour in April. His first post-recovery single – a double A-side of "Crazy Crazy" and the J-Wave campaign song "Sakura no Mori" (桜の森; lit. 'Cherry Blossom Forest') – was released on June 11, 2014. "Crazy Crazy" was written as a homage to the Japanese jazz band Crazy Cats and had been reworked from a somber melody created by Hoshino during his surgery's waiting process. A love for soul artists such as Michael Jackson re-discovered during the single's production primarily inspired "Sakura no Mori", which showcased Hoshino merging Japanese and African-American styles into his musical direction.

=== Conception ===
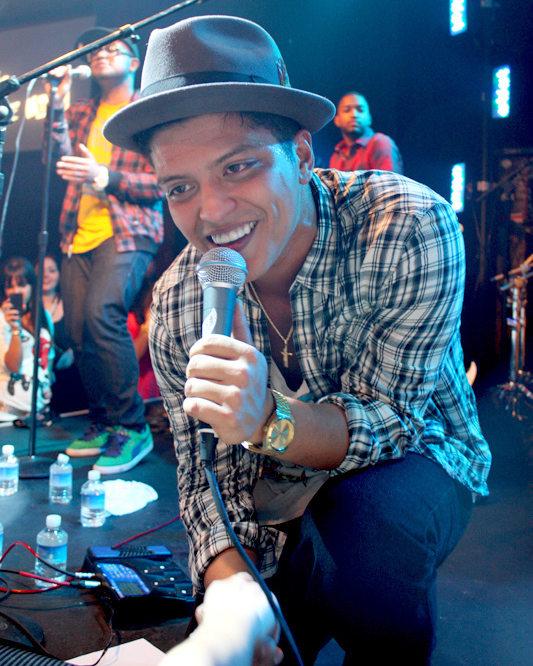
The Japanese success of foreign artists such as Bruno Mars (pictured in 2010) encouraged Hoshino to employ influences of African-American music on Yellow Dancer, previously considering such music a niche.

A fun production on "Sakura no Mori" inspired Hoshino to write an album in the same style, and conceived Yellow Dancer after noticing similarities in the stylistic origins from African-American music in the song and "Why Don't You Play in Hell?". Though the writing process of the singles focused on what Hoshino found fun and his niche musical interests, he was encouraged to explore the styles more openly on an album after noticing a rise in popularity of Western artists such as Chic, Daft Punk, and Bruno Mars in Japan; daily airplay of Mark Ronson and Mars' "Uptown Funk" (2014) at his local Lawson convenience store and the response to "Sakura no Mori" from J-Wave listeners further motivated his work on the album.

One of the major obstacles in the album's production was Hoshino's discomfort replicating black music due to his Japanese nationality. In an interview with Musica magazine, Hoshino spoke of his disinterest in mimicking African-American music: "There was a hole in the middle of the obstacle [of my nationality], and I could've easily passed through. But the end of that path would just be a black music-like thing ... that wouldn't be interesting to make." Instead of replicating black music, he would incorporate elements of it into a J-pop style, a method previously used by 1980s artists such as Toshinobu Kubota and Dreams Come True, who were both cited by Hoshino. In a press comment included with the album's announcement, he described the result of his "respect for black music" such as soul, jazz, R&B, and jump blues, paired with "focus on the emotions of Japanese pop", as his own genre called yellow music (yellow referring to Japanese people). In the same comment, he stated Yellow Dancer was written "having fun doing what I wanted" and shared his belief that the album would make listeners dance with "not only the body, but also with the heart".

=== Writing and production ===
Material specifically for the new album was written by Hoshino throughout 2015. The first song written with the concept of yellow music was the Kokoro ga Pokitto ne drama series theme song "Sun", which was released as the album's third single on May 27, 2015. It helped Hoshino envision what kind of album Yellow Dancer would be, and was in the middle of songs created; half of the others songs on the album were written before it, and the other half after. All tracks were written and produced by Hoshino solo; he also handled principal arrangement, whereas violinist Mio Okamura (a collaborator of Hoshino's since Sakerock) and Ego-Wrappin' support saxophonist Satoru Takeshima are credited for the arrangement of strings and horns, respectively. Lyrically, in contrast to his earliest work, Hoshino said he grew to enjoy writing about the specific emotions of "someone", scenery, and situations, rather than focusing on himself or a story. When questioning what he wanted to express against the black music-inspired sound, he decided to focus on what he described as "Japanese scenery", such as the four seasons, morning and night, or ocean and mountains.

Yellow Dancer was recorded and mixed by Shojiro Watanabe, and mastered by Takahiro Uchida. Production was intersected with Hoshino's acting work (such as on the television drama Dr. Storks, or the sketch variety show Life! Jinsei ni Sasageru Conte), which he said particularly provided difficulty in recording vocals. Since Hoshino's schedule was largely dictated by dates of shootings decided around three days in advance, he would plan around this to book studios and schedule with the engineers. The acting work would also influence parts of the album's writing; Hoshino believes his role as an obstetrician on Dr. Storks unconsciously inspired the lyrics of the album opener "Tokiyo" (時よ; lit. 'Time'), which uses the word aka-chan (lit. 'infant'). Recording was still in progress during Hoshino's interview with Musica on October 1, 2015, and one unspecified song was still without final lyrics; however, alongside the album's announcement on October 14, Hoshino stated that Yellow Dancer had been completed.

== Composition ==
=== Overview ===
Yellow Dancer includes 14 tracks and has a total length of 56 minutes and 27 seconds. Its sound is primarily a mix of Japanese pop and folk with African-American genres like jazz, soul, and R&B, though critics also described it as containing tracks with hints of dance, disco, funk, electro, post-rock, exotica, and Latin. (Note: Tomoyuki Mori of Real Sound attributed dance and funk to "Sun", and exotica to "Nerd Strut"; Tower Records Japan staff reviewer Hirama also attributed dance to "Sun"; Mikiki's Chikako Kato attributed disco to "Sakura no Mori"; Akimasa Munakata, also for Real Sound, attributed electro to "Tokiyo"; Takanori Kuroda at Cinra attributed a post-rock-styled approach to "Down Town"; and Naho Sadahiro for Tower Plus attributed Latin-styled drums also to "Down Town".) Bounce's Daisuke Sawada wrote that Hoshino "worked head-on on [with] soul music, old-time jazz, and R&B", whilst he maintained a "folky poetic sentiment". Skream! magazine's Tomoko Ishisumi thought that the album composed "black grooves" into Hoshino's musical style, but also noticed that certain tracks follow unique styles. The opening numbers "Tokiyo" and "Week End" are upbeat or poppy tracks, whereas "Miss You" (ミスユー, Misu Yū), the acoustic "Kuchizuke" (口づけ; lit. 'Kiss'), and "Yoru" (夜; lit. 'Night') are ballads. The album's lyrical tone is positive.

=== Songs ===
Yellow Dancer's opening song, "Tokiyo", showcases little influence from African-American influences, but instead features elements that were described as Japanese or oriental. A pop song centered on synthesizer, it has a prevalent string section by Okamura, and lyrics about the indiscriminate passage of time. Cinra's Takanori Kuroda compared the song to the work of the electronic music band Yellow Magic Orchestra. The Mezamashi Saturday morning show theme song "Week End", a pop and R&B-infused dance song where Hoshino encourages listeners to dance freely, was compared by CDJournal reviewers to Earth, Wind & Fire's "September" (1978). "Sun" was strongly influenced by Michael Jackson and includes the line "Hey J" as a nod to the singer; a critic for Real Sound compared it to the dance music of Quincy Jones and Jackson's album Off the Wall (1979), whereas Kuroda thought it was particularly reminiscent to the song "Rock with You" from the same album.

"Soul"
Musically, Yellow Dancer is a mix of Japanese and African-American styles. Tomoyuki Mori of Real Sound thought that the soul-infused "Soul" combined a groove similar to Alabama Shakes with text that represents Japanese lyricism or haiku.

Hoshino sings of parting with someone important and new beginnings on "Miss You", a slow-to-medium-paced soul ballad that Mikiki's Chikako Kato thought was close to Baka no Uta. The sixteen-bar and syncopated fifth track "Soul" is named after the genre of the same name and features a Hammond organ, a flute solo, and soul-styled vocal performance. Tomoyuki Mori, writing for Real Sound, thought that "Miss You" and "Soul" showcased similarities to the American artists Curtis Mayfield and Alabama Shakes, respectively, whilst their lyricism represents Japanese writing or possibly haiku, which he described as one of Hoshino's inventions on the album. "Kuchizuke" is an acoustic ballad consisting only of guitar and vocals, where the lyrics discuss life with a partner. Following the calm "Kuchizuke", Kuroda wrote that the album is brought into "chaos" by "Why Don't You Play in Hell?", a New Orleans-styled track led by a sporadic beat and horns. "Nerd Strut", an instrumental number with the subtitle "(Instrumental)", features a bass performance from Yellow Magic Orchestra's Haruomi Hosono, with Hoshino in charge of the rest of the instrumentation (marimba, guitar, drums, piano, Hammond organ, and the banjo-like sanshin). Musically an exotica-styled composition, "Nerd Strut" features hints of calypso and salsa music similarly to Hosono's albums Tropical Dandy (1975), Bon Voyage co. (1976), and Paraiso (1978).

The double A-side singles "Sakura no Mori" and "Crazy Crazy" are placed next to each other on the track listing. The former, a dance and disco track with reminiscence to acid jazz, features guest background vocals from Orarī, Shōhei Takagi, and Yū Arauchi, members of the bands Kata Omoi (Orari) and Cero (Takagi, Arauchi). Its lyrics are a double entendre that can be interpreted as either about excitement at the beginning of spring or an intimate encounter between a man and a woman; Saori Yoshiba at Skream! compared the writing on the song to the work of novelist Ango Sakaguchi. A tribute to the jazz music of Crazy Cats, Hoshino and his musicians tried to replicate "what a grandpa would play at a bar in New Orleans" in "Crazy Crazy", which opens with a piano solo themed to slapstick comedy and silent movies. "Snow Men"—the theme song to a promotional short film by cosmetic company Shiseido—was described as erotic by critics; Hoshino called it a "song of sex".

== Artwork and title ==
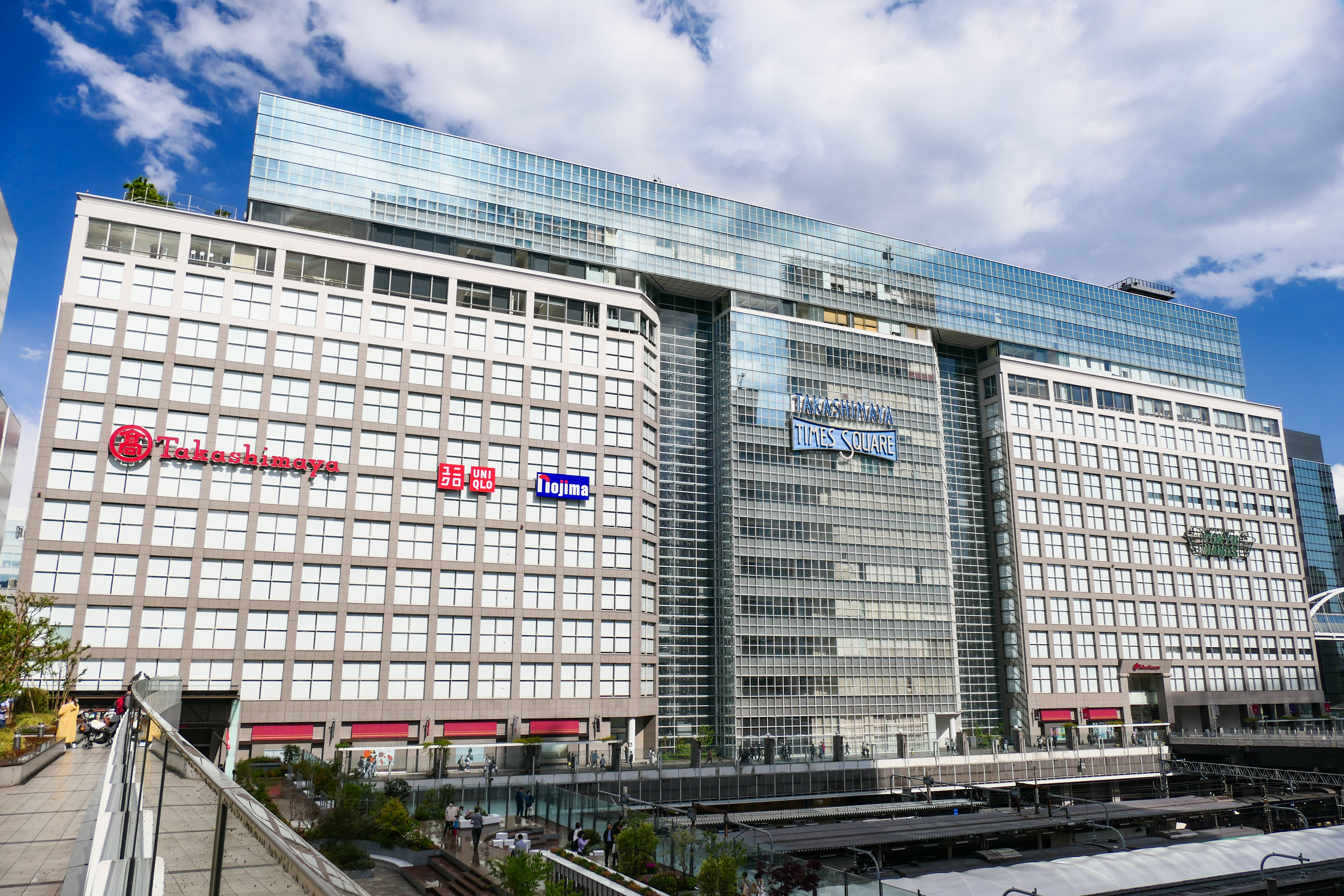
Alongside other nominees at the 2016 Music Jacket Awards, the cover artwork to Yellow Dancer was displayed at a gallery in the Takashimaya Times Square department store (building pictured in 2023).

Art direction for Yellow Dancer was handled by designer Yuni Yoshida. The front cover artwork was unveiled alongside the album's full track listing on October 28, 2015, and features a wide arrange of objects, foods, and animals such as bananas, books, plates, a fork, and a cat, arranged to resemble the back of a maiko (apprentice geisha). News writers for HMV Japan and Billboard Japan called it a poppy expression of Yellow Dancer. An alternate cover with a cherry blossom pink background created for the album's analog version was revealed on January 7, 2016, which Natalie.mu writers thought gave a "warm" impression. At the 2016 Music Jacket Awards, the Yellow Dancer standard cover art was named winner of the Grand Prix by voters of the Recording Industry Association of Japan (RIAJ), beating out 49 other nominees including the runner-ups Inu ni Shite kure by Wasureranne yo and Window by Drop's. Alongside all other nominees, the RIAJ announced that the cover would be displayed at the Music Jacket Gallery 2016, a one-week exhibition at the Takashimaya Times Square department store in Shinjuku, Tokyo. Hoshino continued to work with Yoshida on future projects, including on his follow-up album Pop Virus (2018).

The title of Yellow Dancer was conceived by Hoshino and literally means "Japanese dancer". Though a lover of dance music and dancing, Hoshino thought there was an impression that Japanese people are poor at it and lack individuality in their moves, so named the album from a desire to see people in the Japanese market dance freely. Hoshino accredited his use of the word yellow to refer to Japanese nationality to Haruomi Hosono of Yellow Magic Orchestra. Hoshino names Hosono as his mentor and a major influence in his music; he formed the Sakerock band as a fan of Hosono, before they professionally acquainted at the backstage of a festival around 2007. Hosono was later the one to encourage Hoshino to work on a solo debut, and was described as a "person who [Hoshino] is indebtured to" by Daisuke Kikuchi of Rockin'On Japan.

Retrospectively, Hoshino expressed regret over the album's title in a 2020 interview with Flood Magazine. Though he denied intentional cultural appropriation and voiced support for the Black Lives Matter movement, he stated: "Now that I think about it, it was wrong of me to give it that name. The album Yellow Dancer was strongly influenced by black music, but it was also influenced by music from many other countries that I love, including Japan. It's absolutely impossible for me to paint my music ... into that one color: 'yellow'".

== Track listing ==
All tracks are written, arranged, and produced by Hoshino, except where otherwise noted.

Yellow Dancer — Regular edition
No.	Title	Length
1.	"Tokiyo" (時よ, lit. 'Time')	4:15
2.	"Week End"	4:30
3.	"Sun"	4:01
4.	"Miss You" (ミスユー, Misu Yū)	4:55
5.	"Soul"	3:49
6.	"Kuchizuke" (口づけ, lit. 'Kiss')	3:49
7.	"Why Don't You Play in Hell?" (地獄でなぜ悪い, Jigoku de Naze Warui, lit. 'What's Bad About Hell?')	3:41
8.	"Nerd Strut" (Instrumental)	1:20
9.	"Sakura no Mori" (桜の森, lit. 'Cherry Blossom Forest')	5:10
10.	"Crazy Crazy"	3:34
11.	"Snow Men"	4:34
12.	"Down Town"	3:51
13.	"Yoru" (夜, lit. 'Night')	4:11
14.	"Friend Ship"	4:42
Total length:		56:27

Yellow Dancer — First edition (Blu-ray/DVD — Hoshino Gen Hitori Edge in Budokan)
No.	Title	Length
1.	"Baito" (バイト, lit. 'Part-Time Job')
2.	"Bakemono" (化物, lit. 'Monster')
3.	"Work Song" (ワークソング, Wāku Songu)
4.	"Why Don't You Play in Hell?"
5.	"Tōmei Shōjo" (透明少女, lit. 'Invisible Girl'; writer: Shutoku Mukai; original artist: Number Girl)
6.	"Snow Men"
7.	"Film" (フィルム, Firumu)
8.	"Crazy Crazy"
9.	"Barabara" (ばらばら, lit. 'Scatter')
10.	"Kuse no Uta" (くせのうた, lit. 'Habit Song')
11.	"Eigyō" (営業, lit. 'Business')
12.	"Kudaranai no Naka ni" (くだらないの中に, lit. 'In the Nonsense')
13.	"Rōfūfu" (老夫婦, lit. 'Old Couple')
14.	"Night Troop"
15.	"Record Noise" (レコードノイズ, Rekōdo Noizu)
16.	"Mad Men" (マッドメン, Maddo Men)
17.	"Umi o Sukū" (海を掬う, lit. 'Scoop the Ocean')
18.	"Ichi Ni San" (いち に さん, lit. 'One, Two, Three')
19.	"Sakura no Mori"
20.	"Yume no Soto e" (夢の外へ, lit. 'Out of the Dream')
21.	"Kimi wa Bara yori Utsukushī" (君は薔薇より美しい, lit. 'You're More Beautiful Than a Rose'; writers: Kenji Kadoya, Mickie Yoshino; original artist: Akira Fuse)
22.	"Sun"
Total length:		c.2:07:00

Notes

- "Sun" is stylized in all caps.
- The first edition DVD/Blu-ray includes audio commentary from Hoshino and his collaborators.
- The analog version is a double album, split between "Why Don't You Play in Hell?" and "Nerd Strut". The 2019 LP re-release splits the album into four records: the first disc contains tracks 1–3, the second 4–7, the third 8–11, and the fourth 12–14.

== Personnel ==
Credits adapted from the Yellow Dancer liner notes.

Production

- Gen Hoshino – songwriting, arrangement, production
- Mio Okamura – arrangement of strings
- Satoru Takeshima – arrangement of horns
- Shojiro Watanabe – recording, mixing
- Takahiro Uchida – mastering
- Yuni Yoshida – art direction
- Hideto Kometani – A&R

Instruments

- Gen Hoshino – vocals (1–7, 9–14); guitar (1, 3–4, 6, 8, 11); handclaps (2, 5, 7, 9–10); tambourine (7, 10); marimba (7–8, 14); drums, piano, Hammond organ, sanshin (8)
- Ryosuke Nagaoka – guitar (1–3, 7, 11, 14); handclaps (3)
- Eiko Ishibashi – analog synthesizer (1–3, 14); background vocals (1–3, 5); handclaps (5); marimba (14)
- Wataru Iga – bass (4–5, 7, 9, 11–14); handclaps (12)
- Hama Okamoto – bass (1–3, 10); handclaps (3)
- Haruomi Hosono – bass (8)
- Noriyasu Kawamura – drums (1–5, 11–12, 14); cowbell (1–2, 12); handclaps (3, 12)
- Daichi Ito – drums (7, 9, 12–14); handclaps (12)
- Satoru Takeshima – tenor saxophone (2, 7, 12); flute (5); handclaps (7)
- Hajime Kobayashi – piano (2–4, 10); Wurlitzer piano (2); Hammond organ (4–5); Rhodes piano (9, 11)
- Nobuhide Handa – trombone (2)
- Atsuki Yumoto – trumpet (2)
- Tatsuhiko Yoshizawa – trumpet (2)
- Naofumi Takimoto – trombone (7, 12)
- Taichiro Kawasaki – trumpet (7)
- Orarī – background vocals (9)
- Shōhei Takagi – background vocals (9)
- Yū Arauchi – background vocals (9)
- Masatoshi Nakano – drums (10)
- Teppei Kawakami – trumpet (12)
- Takuji Nomura – piano (13)
- Mio Okamura – violin (1–5, 7, 9, 11)
- Osamu Iyoku – violin (1–5, 7, 9, 11)
- Motoko Fujiie – violin (1)
- Kiyo Kido – violin (1)
- Yu Sugino – violin (1, 3–5, 7, 9, 11)
- Miho Shimokawa – violin (1–5, 11)
- Akane Irie – violin (2–5, 11)
- Shohei Yoshida – violin (2, 9, 11)
- Kazuo Watanabe – violin (2)
- Rena Kato – violin (3)
- Akatsuki Takahashi – violin (5)
- Mikiko Ise – violin (7, 9)
- Reiichi Tateizumi – viola (1–5, 9, 11)
- Mikiyo Kikuchi – viola (1, 3–5, 7, 9, 11)
- Kaoru Hagiwara – viola (7)
- Toshiyuki Muranaka – cello (1, 5)
- Ayano Kasahara – cello (1, 3, 5, 9)
- Mari Masumoto – cello (3, 5, 9)
- Yoshiko Maeda – cello (5)

== Charts ==
=== Weekly charts ===
Weekly chart performance for Yellow Dancer
Chart (2015–18)	Peak position
Japanese Albums (Oricon)	1
Japanese Combined Albums (Oricon)	9
Japanese Hot Albums (Billboard Japan)	1
Taiwanese East Asian Albums (G-Music)	1

=== Year-end charts ===
Year-end chart performance for Yellow Dancer (2015)
Chart (2015)	Position
Japanese Albums (Oricon)	26

Year-end chart performance for Yellow Dancer (2016)
Chart (2016)	Position
Japanese Albums (Oricon)	32
Japanese Hot Albums (Billboard Japan)	6

Year-end chart performance for Yellow Dancer (2017)
Chart (2017)	Position
Japanese Albums (Oricon)	92
Japanese Hot Albums (Billboard Japan)	26
Taiwanese East Asian Albums (G-Music)	6

Year-end chart performance for Yellow Dancer (2018)
Chart (2018)	Position
Japanese Top Download Albums (Billboard Japan)	94

== Certifications and sales ==
Certifications for Yellow Dancer
Region	Certification	Certified units/sales
Japan (RIAJ) Physical sales	Platinum	341,994 (Note: Japanese physical shipments for Yellow Dancer as of January 2019, compiled by Oricon from the album's chart history.)
Japan (RIAJ) Digital downloads	Gold	100,000^{*}
^{*} Sales figures based on certification alone.

== Release history ==
Yellow Dancer release history and formats
Region	Date	Edition	Format	Label	Catalogue code	Ref.
Japan	December 2, 2015	Standard	CD	Speedstar Records	VICL-64439; VIZL-899	
Japan	December 2, 2015	Limited	CD+Blu-ray (A); CD+DVD (B)	Speedstar Records	VIZL-897 (A); VIZL-898 (B)	
Japan	January 20, 2016	Analog	LP	Speedstar Records	VIJL-60160	
Taiwan	January 23, 2017	Standard	CD	Rock Records	GUT-2523	
Japan	March 27, 2019	Limited Production	LP	Speedstar Records	VIJL-60198	
Various	September 30, 2019	Standard	Streaming	Speedstar Records	—N/a	
South Korea	September 30, 2019	Standard	Streaming	J-Box Entertainment	—N/a	

== See also ==
- Billboard Japan Hot Albums § Albums with most chart weeks
