= Yu Arauchi =

- Born: 荒内 佑 (Arauchi Yū); October 22, 1984 (age 41); Tokyo, Japan
- Citizenship: Japan
- Occupations: Musician; record producer; songwriter
- Years active: 2004–present
- Musical career
- Instruments: Vocals; keyboards
- Label: KakubaRhythm
- Website: arauchiyu.com

Yu Arauchi (荒内 佑, Arauchi Yū) is a Japanese musician, composer, keyboardist, and writer. He serves as the main composer and keyboardist for the band Cero.

== Biography ==
Arauchi was born in Tokyo in 1984. His musical interest was greatly influenced by his grandmother who was a music teacher, and had a childhood immersed in classical music. He has defined his musical background as a tapestry of classical and contemporary music, post-punk sounds, dance music, hip-hop, and modern jazz.

He is a member of the three-piece band Cero since 2004, where he contributes to the band’s songwriting and backing vocals. Apart from his work with Cero, Arauchi also provides songs and remixes for various artists.

In 2021, Arauchi released his debut solo album, Śisei, under independent label KakubaRhythm. To promote the album, Arauchi held his first solo concert on September 22, 2021, at Shibuya Club Quatro in Tokyo.

In addition to his musical career, Arauchi is a published writer. In 2020, he released his first essay collection, Kotori-tachi no Keikaku (小鳥たちの計画, lit. 'The Plan of the Little Birds'), published by Chikuma Shobo.

== Discography ==
=== Studio albums ===
Title	Details
Śisei	Released: August 25, 2021; Label: KakubaRhythm; Formats: CD, LP, digital download
