= Sun (Gen Hoshino song) =

2015 single by Gen Hoshino

Single by Gen Hoshino

from the album Yellow Dancer
- Language: Japanese
- B-side: "Moon Sick": "Ichi Ni San"; "Madmen"
- Released: May 27, 2015
- Genre: J-pop; rock
- Length: 4:03
- Label: Speedstar
- Songwriter: Gen Hoshino
- Producer: Gen Hoshino

Gen Hoshino singles chronology
| "Crazy Crazy" / "Sakura no Mori" (2014) | "Sun" (2015) | "Koi" (2016) |

Music video
- "Sun" (Official Video) on YouTube

"Sun" (Japanese pronunciation: [saꜜɴ]) is a song by Japanese musician Gen Hoshino from his fourth studio album, Yellow Dancer (2015). It was released through Speedstar Records on May 27, 2015, as Hoshino's eighth single overall. Self-produced and written by Hoshino for the television series Kokoro ga Pokitto ne, it is a lively J-pop song that draws influences from African-American genres, such as disco and soul, and is particularly inspired by Michael Jackson. Hoshino wrote its lyrics to not have much meaning, wishing for the song to excite people into having fun by simply listening.

Upon release, "Sun" reached No. 2 on Oricon's Japanese Singles Chart and took the first spot on several streaming services. It continued to chart through 2017, reaching No. 2 on the Billboard Japan Hot 100 in January 2016, and was certified by the Recording Industry Association of Japan for 850,000 sales and 50,000,000 streams. The song's music video, directed by Kazuaki Seki, choreographed by Mikiko, and starring Hoshino and six similar-looking girls, was the Best Male Video at the 2015 MTV Video Music Awards Japan. "Sun" received positive reception from critics and was Hoshino's most performed song in its year of release.

== Production ==
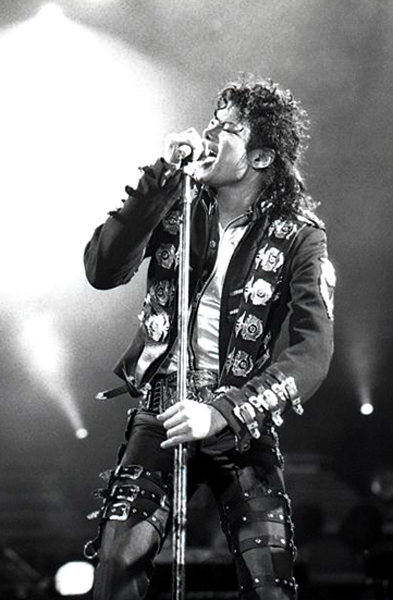
Gen Hoshino was inspired by African-American music, such as that of Michael Jackson (pictured)

In an interview with Rockin'On Japan about "Sun", Gen Hoshino said that he felt he had managed to express a "sound from [the] inside" on his previous double A-sided single "Crazy Crazy" / "Sakura no Mori" (2014), but had gained interest in writing an A-side with stronger focus on J-pop immediately upon its release. He wanted to make something fun without particular deep meaning; a track that would excite people by just listening.

Hoshino wrote "Sun" as the theme song to the television drama Kokoro ga Pokitto ne. Though the original offer requested a punk rock song, Hoshino rearranged it to a funk style after seeing the drama in editing, and utilized a mental image of almost-broken people forgetting it all and dancing to create the song. Hoshino incorporated African-American music into his J-pop style, and particularly took influence from Michael Jackson. He had first attempted this mix with "black music" on "Yuge", the B-side to his debut single "Kudaranai no Naka ni" (2011), and later revisited a similar style on "Sakura no Mori" after rediscovering a love for soul music, including that of Jackson. Hoshino described that production of "Sun" started with African-American music, which he altered to J-pop before the song finally ended as "yellow music". Takanori Kuroda of Cinra wrote that this seemingly set the direction of the Yellow Dancer album as a whole.

Hoshino conceived of the title "Sun" in respect to Jackson, who he compared to a sun: "Even though [the sun / Jackson] gives everyone energy and hope, no one can come close [because they will get burnt]; I created "Sun" with that sort of lonely image." The song's working title was "Sun Village", a humorous reference to the surname of comedian Yūki Himura in kanji. (Note: Himura's family name consists of the kanji 日, hi (day / sun) and 村, mura (village).) At the time of the song's release, on the radio program of Himura's comedy duo Bananaman, Hoshino told Himura that the "Sun" in the title also originated from him, but later admitted that this was a lie to make the comedian happy.

== Promotion and release ==
"Sun" was announced as the theme song to Kokoro ga Pokitto ne in March 2015, as Hoshino concluded a two-day performance tour at the Yokohama Arena. It is Hoshino's first song written for a drama series. Upon its announcement, Hoshino commented that he was glad to have written his first drama theme song and explained its basic meaning, whereas leading cast member Sadao Abe – a friend of Hoshino – expressed excitement to seeing what feelings had put into the track. "Sun" was later previewed in a commercial for Kokoro ga Pokitto ne in the final episode of the show's time slot predecessor, Zannen na Otto, on March 25.

Broadcast of Kokoro ga Pokitto ne began on April 8, 2015, and continued until June 10. "Sun" was released by the Victor Entertainment label Speedstar Records on May 27, 2015, about a year after "Crazy Crazy" / "Sakura no Mori", and marked Hoshino's eighth single overall. The single includes the title track and the B-sides "Moon Sick", "Ichi Ni San", and "Madmen". Its cover art features Hoshino, smiling as he stands in front of a large sun; Victor Entertainment commented that the cover intends to give people a "fun feeling" without needing to listen to the song itself. "Sun" was included as the third track on Hoshino's fourth studio album Yellow Dancer, released December 2, 2015, and is its third and final single by release date.

First editions of the single were bundled with a bonus DVD, titled the Sun Disc, that lasts roughly 54 minutes. It includes a documentary to the recording of "Ichi Ni San", video of Hoshino's performance at the Victor Rock Festival 2015, and a "private close-up" with Hoshino's alter ego character Akira Nise (named as "that man" / あの男, ano otoko). A seven inch vinyl / analog version was issued, containing "Sun" and its instrumental version. Its cover art features Hoshino making a stern facing, rather than the smile he gives on the CD release. CD singles with differing covers of Hoshino doing various poses were made exclusively available via certain record retailers, including HMV, Tower Records Japan, and Yamano Music, among others. In coincidence with the single's release, the exhibit Gen Hoshino no Hetakuso Kaiga Kyōshitsu (transl. Gen Hoshino's Awful Painting Class) was held at the same stores, displaying hand-drawn illustrations made by Hoshino. Subjects for the drawings were chosen from fan submissions on Twitter.

== Composition and lyrics ==
"Sun"
A sample of "Sun". It is an upbeat J-pop song with elements of Western genres such as disco and soul.

"Sun" was written and self-produced by Hoshino, and co-arranged with violin player Mio Okamura who often collaborated with Hoshino on the instrumental band Sakerock. Hoshino sings the song and plays guitar alongside Ryosuke Nagaoka. The recording also features Noriyasu Kawamura on drums, Hama Okamoto on bass guitar, Hajime Kobayashi on piano, and Eiko Ishibashi on background vocals and synthesizer. Takahiro Uchida served as audio masterer. According to sheet music from publisher Gekkayo, the melody to "Sun" is composed in A-flat major with a moderato tempo of 108 beats per minute (BPM).

CDJournal categorizes "Sun" as Japanese rock and pop and called it disco-like. It is a lively track, opened with the electronic sound of an analog synthesizer accompanied by guitar. As it progresses, the guitars rise in sound as the song begins to utilize Japanese scales. After the main chorus, Hoshino sings in "ah"s, to which the BPM is matched. Takanori Kuroda (Cinra) noticed 1980s disco influences, such as in a "excitingly" rising phrase in the string arrangement, similar to "Rock with You". Analysis for Real Sound described the track as a "parade"; it noted, though a more lively sound had become the general direction of Hoshino's music following the album Stranger (2013), "Sun" was almost radical in this regard. The analysis recognized influences from Jackson's Off the Wall, Quincy Jones, and, in the string arrangement, Philadelphia soul, but concluded that the song's electronic elements ultimately made it more similar to French house. The melody to "Sun" incorporates parts of "Himura-san 42-sai Tanjōbi no Uta" (日村さん42歳誕生日の歌; lit. "Himura's 42nd Birthday Song"), a song Hoshino wrote and performed for Yūki Himura on the latter's radio program in 2014.

According to Hoshino, the lyrics to "Sun" do not contain much of a message, as he instead focused on building on the "good feeling" of the composition. Suiting the lyrics to this feeling included matching the BPM to the "ah"s and use of "baby" in the lyrics, Hoshino's first time using the word in music. Hoshino wanted to convey that, if someone has several worries, it is better for the person to recognize the worries but not emphasize them, and instead do something enjoyable. Believing that loneliness had eventually helped him reach a point were "we can just hold hands", Hoshino aimed to move away from a profusely lonely attitude on lines such as "Let me hear your voice." The line "Hey J" in the second verse refers to Michael Jackson.

=== B-sides ===
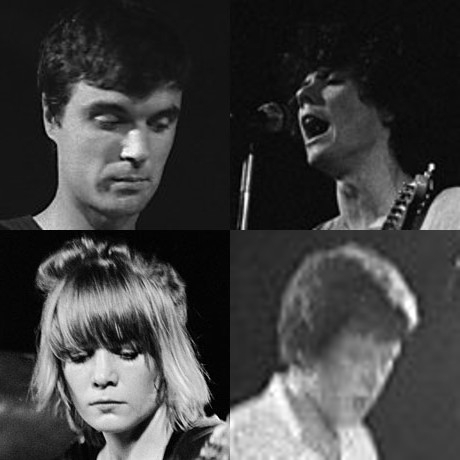
The final B-side "Madmen" was described as a parody of "Psycho Killer" by Talking Heads (members pictured).

The "Sun" single includes three B-sides: "Moon Sick", "Ichi Ni San" (いち に さん; lit. "One Two Three"), and "Madmen" (マッドメン, Maddomen). "Moon Sick" is a night-themed song about the moon, contrasting to the A-side title. It is inspired by 1970s Japanese folk and 50s jump blues, with elements of "post hip hop" instrumentation. "Ichi Ni San" was created and played solely by Hoshino. He first recorded its acoustic guitar, edited it digitally, and finally added in drums for a hip hop-like production process. The final track, "Mad Men", is denoted as House Version, referring to its home recording. It features a guitar sound, layered below a rhythm machine. Real Sound and Cinra noted influence of the American rock band Talking Heads on the track, and Real Sound called it a "straight" parody of their song "Psycho Killer".

== Music video ==
The music video to "Sun" was headed by Perfume and Sakanaction video director Kazuaki Seki, whereas choreography was provided by Mikiko, who would also work on the videos to "Koi" and lead Yellow Dancer track "Toki yo". Filmed with a motion control camera in the style of a one-shot film, the video scrolls throughout strange, colorful spaces connected by doors as Hoshino dances with eight girls, all sporting bowl cuts. It is intersected by an ad for Sun Disc. The music video won the award for Best Male Video at the 2015 MTV Video Music Awards Japan.

One scene of the video features Akira Nise. A family photo is discreetly hidden in the scene; on Bananaman's radio program, Hoshino revealed that it is a photo edited to have Sadao Abe as the father, Himura as the mother, and Hoshino as the son. Coupled with the reference to Himura in the song's temporary title, AOL News Japan wrote that "Sun" includes much "essence" of Himura and that the song showcases his and Hoshino's good relationship.

== Critical reception ==
A writer for Real Sound found themself surprised by "Sun", praising its energic composition which they wrote rivaled songs such as "Treasure" by Bruno Mars and "Miracle" by Kimbra. While opining that the track does well in sounding like classic songs, the writer felt the electro elements like its synthesizer helped it positively also secure a J-pop sound. An official introduction comment for Tower Records Japan described "Sun" as a classic-sounding song that makes listeners want to dance, and complimented Hoshino's vocals for matching this "exciting" dance music style. Takanori Kuroda (Cinra), similarly to Real Sound, praised Eiko Ishibashi's "noisy" synth for providing a unique, thrilling sound. Kuroda also enjoyed Hoshino's arrangement work on the track for incorporating an easily understandable J-pop sound into the African-American influences. Tied with Superfly's "Beautiful", "Sun" took fifth place for Best Theme Song at The TV 's 2015 Drama Academy Awards. It was the second most-voted song by The TV staff writers, but did not make the top five in user votes.

== Commercial performance ==
Pre-release, "Sun" reached first place on the Billboard Japan's Adult Contemporary Airplay chart dated April 29, 2015, and took No. 23 on the Hot 100 on May 20. In its initial release weeks, the single sold 51,599 physical copies, opening at a peak position at No. 2 on Oricon's weekly Singles Chart and rising to No. 4 on the Hot 100. Certified Gold by the Recording Industry Association of Japan (RIAJ), it had reached 100,000 digital downloads by January 2016 and took No. 1 on the individual charts of several music streaming sites, including iTunes, Mora, and Oricon's official store. In its year-end chart for 2015, Oricon accounted a total of 82,812 CDs sold and placed the song at No. 76; it took No. 22 on the Hot 100's year-end chart, and No. 9 on the airplay's.

In January 2016, the RIAJ certified "Sun" for 100,000 physical sales as the song reached a peak on the Hot 100 at No. 2, a position it would reach twice more within this quarter. At the end of its second year, "Sun" placed at a new high of No. 9 on the Hot 100 year-end chart but did not resurface on Oricon's. It became Hoshino's first song to enter the year-end Joysound karaoke rankings, taking No. 9 in 2016 and later No. 17 in 2017. By January 2017, its digital sales had rosen to 750,000, earning a 3× Platinum from the RIAJ. "Sun" made its final appearance on the Oricon chart in March 2017, having charted in the top 100 for a total of 17 weeks and in the top 200 for 55. In October 2022, the track earned a third Gold certification 50,000,000 streams.

== Live performances ==
According to Hoshino, "Sun" was his most performed song of 2015. The debut performance of the song occurred on May 29, 2015 – two days after its release – when Hoshino appeared as one of six guests on the TV program Music Station. Hoshino later performed the song at an event for the first time during his Hitori Edge tour at the Budokan on August 13. In December, Hoshino sung "Sun" at the 66th NHK Kōhaku Uta Gassen, his Kōhaku debut. He wore a white suit and appeared on stage alongside the dancers from "Sun"'s music video. To promote Yellow Dancer, Hoshino embarked on the Yellow Voyage tour, performing "Sun" and other tracks from the album. The song was also featured on the set list for the Pop Virus Tokyo Dome tour, promoting his fifth album Pop Virus (2018).

Other performances as a guest at events and on TV shows include on Kan Jam: Kanzennen Show (in 2015), with SMAP at one of their concerts (2015), at a Music Station Super Live (2015), at the Space Shower Music Awards after Hoshino received the award for Best Male Artist (2016), at the TV Asahi Dream Festival (2016), at the Tokyo Metropolitan Rock Festival in a joint performance with Okamoto's (2016), at the FNS Music Festival (2021), on SONGS (2021), and with Yoasobi on NHK's Kimi no Koe ga Kikitai (2022).

== Track listing ==
All tracks are written by Gen Hoshino.

Regular edition

1. "Sun" – 4:03
2. "Moon Sick" – 2:39
3. "Ichi Ni San" – 3:44
4. "Madmen" (House Version) – 3:07

Total length: 13:33

First edition (DVD – Sun Disc)

1. "Tokubetsu Bangumi (Sono Ato no Nise Akira)"
2. "Ichi Ni San" (Rec. Making)
3. "Gensen Live" (Victor Rock Festival 2015)

Analog (vinyl) version

1. "Sun", side A
2. "Sun" (Instrumental), side B

== Personnel ==
Adapted from the liner notes of Yellow Dancer

- Gen Hoshino – vocals, guitar, chorus, arrangement, string arrangement, producer
- Noriyasu Kawamura – drums, handclaps
- Hama Okamoto – bass, handclaps
- Hajime Kobayashi – piano
- Eiko Ishibashi – analog synthesizer, chorus
- Ryosuke Nagaoka – guitar, handclaps
- Mio Okamura – string arrangement, first violin
- Osamu Iyoku – first violin
- Shohei Yoshida – first violin
- Akane Irie – first violin
- Yu Sugino – second violin
- Miho Shimokawa – second violin
- Mikiyo Kikuchi – viola
- Reiichi Tateizumi – viola
- Ayano Sasahara – cello
- Mari Masumoto – cello
- Shojiro Watanabe – recording and mixing
- Takahiro Uchida – mastering

== Charts ==
=== Weekly charts ===
Weekly chart performance of "Sun" (2015–19)
| Chart (2015–19) | Peak position |
|---|---|
| Japan (Billboard Japan Hot 100) | 2 |
| Japanese Adult Contemporary (Billboard Japan) | 1 |
| Japan (Oricon) | 2 |

Weekly chart performance of "Sun" (2022)
| Chart (2022) | Peak position |
|---|---|
| Japanese Adult Contemporary (Billboard Japan) | 83 |

=== Yearly charts ===
2015 year-end chart performance of "Sun"
| Chart (2015) | Position |
|---|---|
| Japan (Oricon) | 76 |
| Japan (Billboard Japan Hot 100) | 22 |
| Japanese Radio Songs (Billboard Japan) | 9 |

2016 year-end chart performance of "Sun"
| Chart (2016) | Position |
|---|---|
| Japan (Billboard Japan Hot 100) | 9 |
| Japanese Radio Songs (Billboard Japan) | 8 |

2017 year-end chart performance of "Sun"
| Chart (2017) | Position |
|---|---|
| Japan (Billboard Japan Hot 100) | 69 |

== Certifications and sales ==
Certifications for "Sun"
| Region | Certification | Certified units/sales |
|---|---|---|
| Japan (RIAJ) Physical single | Gold | 100,000^{^} |
| Japan (RIAJ) Digital single | 3× Platinum | 750,000^{*} |
Streaming
| Japan (RIAJ) Digital track | Gold | 50,000,000^{†} |
^{*} Sales figures based on certification alone.^{^} Shipments figures based on certification alone.^{†} Streaming-only figures based on certification alone.

== Release history ==
Release dates and formats for "Sun"
| Region | Date | Edition | Format | Label | Catalogue code | Ref(s). |
|---|---|---|---|---|---|---|
| Japan | May 27, 2015 | Standard | CD | Speedstar Records | VICL-37059 | |
| Japan | May 27, 2015 | First (limited) | CD+DVD | Speedstar Records | VIZL-835 | |
| Japan | May 27, 2015 | Analog (limited) | Vinyl | Speedstar Records | VIKL-30070 | |
| Worldwide | May 27, 2015 | Standard | Digital download | Speedstar Records | —N/a | |
| Worldwide | June 23, 2015 | Standard | Streaming | Speedstar Records | —N/a | |
