= Natalie (website) =

Japanese entertainment news website

- Website type: Entertainment news
- Available in: Japanese
- Owners: Natasha, Inc.
- Website: natalie.mu
- Commercial: Yes
- Launched: February 1, 2007; 19 years ago
- Current status: Online

Natalie (Japanese: ナタリー, Hepburn: Natarī) is a Japanese entertainment news website that debuted on February 1, 2007. It is operated by Natasha, Inc. The website is named after the song of the same name by Julio Iglesias. Natalie has been providing news for such leading Japanese portals and social networks as Mobage Town, GREE, Livedoor, Excite, Mixi, and Yahoo! Japan. It has also been successful on Twitter, with 1,510,000 followers as of February 2017, being the third-most-followed Japanese media company, after The Mainichi Shimbun and The Asahi Shimbun.

== History ==
Natasha, Inc., a content provider, was founded in December 2005, becoming a limited company in February 2006 and being demutualized in January 2007.

On February 1, 2007, Natasha, Inc. opened its own news website Natalie, named after the song "Nathalie" by Julio Iglesias. It was dedicated exclusively to music news and created with the idea of updating on a daily basis, something that newspapers could not do. The website also offered optional registration, that would allow commenting on news articles and creating a list of up to 30 artists to receive updates about.

Natalie grew fast, opening a manga news sub-site, Comic Natalie (コミックナタリー), on December 25, 2008, and a comedian news sub-site, Owarai Natalie (お笑いナタリー), on August 5, 2009.

It opened a cultural goods shop, Natalie Store (ナタリーストア), on August 1, 2012, a movie news sub-site, Eiga Natalie (映画ナタリー), on March 23, 2015, and a theater news sub-site, Stage Natalie (ステージナタリー), on February 2, 2016. They also opened a snack news sub-site, Oyatsu Natalie (おやつナタリー), on May 18, 2011, but it proved to be short-lived and closed on August 31 of the same year.

== Management ==
Natasha, Inc.
- Type: K.K.
- Industry: Telecommunications, Internet, Mass media
- Founded: December 28, 2005; 20 years ago
- Founder: Takuya Ōyama
- Headquarters: 1-2-4 Jingumae, Shibuya, Tokyo 150-0001, Japan
- Key people: Takuya Ōyama, CEO
- Owner: KDDI 90%, Takuya Oyama et al. 10%
- Number of employees: 88
- Parent: KDDI (since 2014)
- Website: natasha.co.jp

The founder and representative director of Natasha, Inc. is Takuya Ōyama. He is also the editor-in-chief of the music news website. As of 2008, the board director and editor-in-chief of Comic Natalie was Gen Karaki, also a bass player for such artists as Speed, Ram Rider, Haruko Momoi, and Nana Katase.

Since 2014, Natasha is a subsidiary of KDDI.

== Critical response ==
According to the news media outlet IT Media News, while the Natalie music website has much information for hardcore fans, the material is overly detailed and readers only glimpse at its content.
