= Pop Virus =

Studio album by Gen Hoshino
- Released: December 19, 2018
- Genre: J-pop
- Length: 55:37
- Label: Victor Entertainment

Gen Hoshino chronology
Yellow Dancer (2015)	Pop Virus (2018)	Same Thing (2019)

Singles from Pop Virus
- 1. "Koi" Released: October 5, 2016; 2. "Family Song" Released: August 16, 2017; 3. "Idea" Released: August 20, 2018

Pop Virus (Japanese pronunciation: [poppɯ wiꜜɾɯsɯ]) is the fifth studio album by Gen Hoshino, released in 2018.

The first track of the album, also named "Pop Virus", is playable in the 2019 video game Death Stranding.

== Track listing ==
All music is composed by Gen Hoshino.

No.	Title	Length
1.	"Pop Virus"
2.	"Koi" (恋 "Love")
3.	"Get a Feel"
4.	"Hada" (肌 "Skin")
5.	"Pair Dancer"
6.	"Present"
7.	"Dead Leaf"
8.	"KIDS"
9.	"Continues"
10.	"Sapiens"
11.	"Idea"
12.	"Family Song"
13.	"Nothing"
14.	"Hello Song"

== Charts ==
=== Weekly charts ===
Chart (2019)	Peak position
Japanese Albums (Oricon)	1

=== Year-end charts ===
Chart (2019)	Position
Japanese Albums (Oricon)	4

== Accolades ==
Year	Ceremony	Award	Result
2019	CD Shop Awards	Grand Prix	Won
2019	Space Shower Music Awards	Album of the Year	Won
2019	MTV VMAJ	Best Album of the Year	Won
