= Football Hour =

Japanese comedy duo

- Futtobōru Awā (フットボールアワー)
- Employer: Yoshimoto Kogyo

Comedy career
- Years active: 1999–
- Members: Terumoto Gotō (Tsukkomi); Nozomu Iwao (Boke)

Notes
- Same year/generation as: Kentaro Kokado (Lotti)

Football Hour (フットボールアワー, Futtobōru Awā) is a Japanese comedy duo (kombi) consisting of Terumoto Gotō (tsukkomi) and Nozomu Iwao (boke), both from Osaka. They are performers for the entertainment company Yoshimoto Kogyo. They graduated from the Yoshimoto NSC Osaka 14th generation class.

The unit's material is created by both Goto and Iwao.

== Members ==
- Terumoto Gotō (後藤 輝基, Gotō Terumoto) Born June 18, 1974 in Higashiyodogawa-ku, Osaka. Plays the tsukkomi. His style of tsukkomi is well known for his use of metaphors and analogies.
- Nozomu Iwao (岩尾 望, Iwao Nozomu) Born December 19, 1975 in Higashisumiyoshi-ku, Osaka. Plays the boke. In Yoshimoto Kogyo's annual "Ugliest Yoshimoto Kogyo Entertainer" awards, he won first place three years in a row (2002-2004) and has since been ineligible for voting. Iwao himself does not consider himself to be unattractive but rather fashionable and trendy.

== Life and career ==
Both Gotō and Iwao were in prior units before the formation of Football Hour. Gotō was in the comedy duo Gotō-Tenma (Later renamed to Electronic Gram) from 1994 to 1999 and Iwao was in the comedy duo Dress from 1994 to 1999. Both of them were graduates of the 14th generation class from Yoshimoto NSC Osaka. In April 1999, after both of their previous units were disbanded, the two partnered up and formed Gotō-Iwao, debuting in May of the same year. They changed their unit's name to Football Hour just 2 months after, in July.

As classmates from Yoshimoto NSC, Gotō and Iwao mutually approved of each other's abilities in comedy, and thus chose to partner up with each other after Iwao's consultation with comedian Tomonori Jinnai and Gotō's consultation with Komoto from Jicho Kacho. Jinnai was supportive of the idea, but Komoto believed that the combination would not work as their individual characters are too strong.

In 2000, the duo received the best newcomer award at the ABC Owarai Newcomer Grand Prix. The next year, they entered M-1 Grand Prix and placed 6th. The duo made it as a finalist again the following year, placing 2nd as the runners-up and finally winning the competition in 2003.

The duo was propelled into popularity afterwards and furthered their career in Tokyo, where they now appear on numerous television programs. Gotō became one of the more prominent television presenters after the retirement of Shinsuke Shimada after 2011.

== Achievements ==
- 21st ABC (Asahi Broadcasting Corporation) Owarai Newcomer Grand Prix - Best Newcomer Award, 2000
- 31st NHK Kamigata Manzai Contest - Best Newcomer Award, 2001
- 32nd NHK Kamigata Manzai Contest - Best Newcomer Award, 2002
- 37th Kamigata Manzai Award - Best Newcomer Award, 2002
- 31st Kamigata Owarai Award - Best Newcomer Award, 2002
- 1st MBS (Mainichi Broadcasting System, Inc.) The Rising Generation Award - Winner, 2003
- 32nd Kamigata Owarai Award - Topic Award, 2003
- 1st Autobacs M-1 Grand Prix - Finalist, 6th place, 2001
- 2nd Autobacs M-1 Grand Prix - Finalist, 2nd place, 2002
- 3rd Autobacs M-1 Grand Prix - Winner, 2003
- 6th Autobacs M-1 Grand Prix - Finalist, 2nd place, 2006
- 39th Kamigata Manzai Award - Winner, 2004
- 33rd Kamigata Owarai Award - Best Technique Award, 2004
