= Nakagawake =

Japanese comedian duo

- Nakagawake (中川家)
- Employer: Yoshimoto Kogyo

Comedy career
- Years active: 1992–
- Genres: Manzai; Conte
- Members: Reiji (Tsukkomi); Tsuyoshi (Boke)

Notes
- Same year/generation as: Tomonori Jinnai; Kendo Kobayashi; Kenji Tamura

Nakagawake (中川家, Nakagawake) is a Japanese comedy duo (kombi) consisting of Reiji (礼二) and Tsuyoshi (剛). Reiji and Tsuyoshi are actual brothers and their last name is Nakagawa, hence their unit name Nakagawake (Meaning House of Nakagawa). They are employed by Yoshimoto Kogyo, and are mainly active in Tokyo. They have appeared in many television shows and are the winners of the 1st M-1 Grand Prix in 2001

== Members ==
- Reiji Nakagawa (中川礼二), born November 19, 1972, in Moriguchi, Osaka. Plays the tsukkomi and writes all their manzai material. He is the younger brother of the two, and is referred to as just Reiji by Tsuyoshi.
- Tsuyoshi Nakagawa (中川剛), born December 12, 1970, in Moriguchi, Osaka. Plays the boke and writes all their Ccnte material. He is the older brother of the two, and is referred to as Onii-chan by Reiji.

== Life and career ==
Reiji and Tsuyoshi both attended the same elementary school, and both graduated from Kaji Junior High School. Comedian Hidehiko Masuda (of Masuda Okada) was Tsuyoshi's senior by one year at the same elementary and middle school. Tsuyoshi went on to graduate from Osaka Prefectural Moriguchi Higashi High School, while Reiji graduated from Kinki Joho Specialist High School. Both brothers were salarymen after graduation for a while, until Tsuyoshi invited Reiji to form a comedy duo. The two entered the Yoshimoto NSC as part of the 11th generation class, where their classmates included Tomonori Jinnai, Harigane Rock, Kendo Kobayashi, Kenji Tamura, and more.

Reiji and Tsuyoshi's Manzai was well received in the academy, and they performed their Manzai on television as The Nakagawa Brothers and later as Nakagawake. In 1996, the duo won the 17th ABC Comedy Newcomers Grand Prix - Newcomer Excellence Award and gained popularity in the Kansai region, appearing on variety shows such as Sunge! Best 10.

In 1997, Tsuyoshi developed a panic disorder, causing difficulty for their career as their multiple regular programs dropped to only one radio program. The duo suffered a slight setback, but bounced back after Tsuyoshi overcame the disorder.

Nakagawake went on to appear in programs outside of the Kansai region, and became popular nationwide, particularly in Tokyo. In 2001, the M-1 Grand Prix was established and Nakagawake became the first winner of the Manzai competition, gaining the duo popularity and allowing them to move to Tokyo to focus on developing their careers in the metropolis. This move marked them as one of the first comedy duos of that era to move activities to Tokyo, sparking many others to follow suit, such as Kirin, Shinagawa Shoji, Jichō Kachō, Penalty, Ogi Yahagi and more.

They continued to flourish on television and comedy, with their main focus on Manzai. Reiji became one of the regular judges for the M-1 Grand Prix from 2015 onward. They won two Kamikata Manzai Awards in 2010 and 2019 (45th and 54th) as well as becoming a certified Manzai comedian for The Manzai in 2012.
