= Last One Standing (Japanese TV series) =

2022 Japanese Netflix TV series

Japanese name
- Kanji: トークサバイバー！～トークが面白いと生き残れるドラマ～
- Literal meaning: Talk Survivor! ~Survive The Drama with Interesting Stories~
Transcriptions
- Revised Hepburn: Tōkusabaibā! ~Tōku ga omoshiroi to ikinokoreru dorama~
- Genre: crime drama; comedy show; reality show
- Created by: Nobuyuki Sakuma
- Written by: Ryoichi Tsuchiya
- Directed by: Hayato Kawai
- Presented by: Nobu (Chidori)
- No. of seasons: 3
- No. of episodes: 24

Production
- Executive producer: Shinichi Takahashi (Netflix)
- Producers: Yoko Usui; Seiya Horio
- Production companies: Nobuyuki Sakuma Agency; United Production; Yoshimoto Kogyo; Netflix

Original release
- Network: Netflix
- Release: March 8, 2022

Last One Standing (Japanese: トークサバイバー！～トークが面白いと生き残れるドラマ～, Hepburn: Tōkusabaibā! ~Tōku ga omoshiroi to ikinokoreru dorama~; transl. Talk Survivor! ~Survive The Drama with Interesting Stories~) is a 2022 crime drama/comedy reality show, produced by Netflix and launched on the streaming service on March 8, 2022. It stars the comedy duo Chidori and features a number of Japanese comedians as contestants.

== Premise ==
The story is a crime drama which starts at the NF High School, where a precious painting has been stolen from the principal's office. Several times each episode, a character would pose a question to the contestants, who also play roles in the drama and would then drop character and tell a story relevant to the question. In the end of each episode, one or more contestants would be eliminated from the contest and also removed from the plot.

== Production ==
Last One Standing was inspired by the "Dramatic Heartbreak King" segments of the variety show Neo Battle Variety: King-chan, which was also produced by Nobuyuki Sakuma and hosted by Chidori, and aired primarily on TV Tokyo for three seasons from 2016 to 2018.

== Reception ==
Last One Standing became Netflix's most popular show in Japan after its premiere. Decider rated the show "Stream It", commenting that it is "fun watching the contestants trying to one-up each other" and contrasted it to the "serious and dramatic" plot. The Times of India rated it 3.5 out of five stars, similarly praised its "entertaining" combination of suspenseful elements with light-hearted humor and suggested it might inspire an Indian adaptation.

== Cast ==
=== MC ===
Nobu (Chidori)

=== Observers ===
- Karen Takizawa
- Shiori Sato (Seasons 1−2)
- Reina Triendl (Season 1)
- Manatsu Akimoto (Season 3)

=== Drama ===
==== Season 1 ====
- Shotaro Mamiya as Saiki
- Hikaru Takahashi as Misato
- Masahiro Higashide as Sudo
- Koki Okada as Kubota
- Yuki Morinaga as Sakurai
- Kaito Yoshimura as Student
- Nadal as Student
- Takenori Goto as Iwata
- Mikie Hara as Teacher
- Yoshifumi Sakai as Teacher
- Yoshiyuki Morishita

== Episodes ==
=== Season 1 ===
No	Title	Contestants (first appearances only)	Drama cast (first appearances only)	Guest observer
1	So We Meet Again	Daigo (Chidori), Gekidan Hitori, Kazuki Iio (Zun), Minami Minegishi, Takemasa Tsukaji (Drunk Dragon), Toshiyuki Itakura (Impulse), Takushi Tanaka (Ungirls)	Shotaro Mamiya Hikaru Takahashi Takenori Gotō	Karen Takizawa
2	An Unforeseen Future		Shotaro Mamiya Hikaru Takahashi Takenori Gotō	Karen Takizawa
3	We Can Make It Right		Shotaro Mamiya Hikaru Takahashi Takenori Gotō	Karen Takizawa
4	Restart	Kendo Kobayashi, Yuki Iwai (Haraichi), Kei Mukai (Panther), Tetsuya Morita (Saraba Seishun no Hikari), Takashi Yoshimura (Heisei Nobushi Kobushi), Eiko Kano	Masahiro Higashide Hiroaki Okada Yuki Morinaga	Shiori Sato
5	Youthful Days are Gone Forever	Hiccorohee, Takashi Watanabe (Nishikigoi), Tonikaku Akarui Yasumura, Hironobu Komiya (Sanshiro), Iwakura (Kaerutei), Ahn Mika, Shunsuke Ito (Ozwald), Sāya (Lalande)	Masahiro Higashide Hiroaki Okada Yuki Morinaga	Shiori Sato
6	Escape from a Labyrinth	Toshiaki Kasuga (Audrey)		Reina Triendl
7	Repeat Mistakes	Haruna Kondō (Harisenbon)		Reina Triendl
8	The End, and The Beginning			Karen Takizawa

== See also ==
- Murderville
