= Non Style =

Japanese comedy duo

- NON STYLE (ノンスタイル, Non Sutairu)
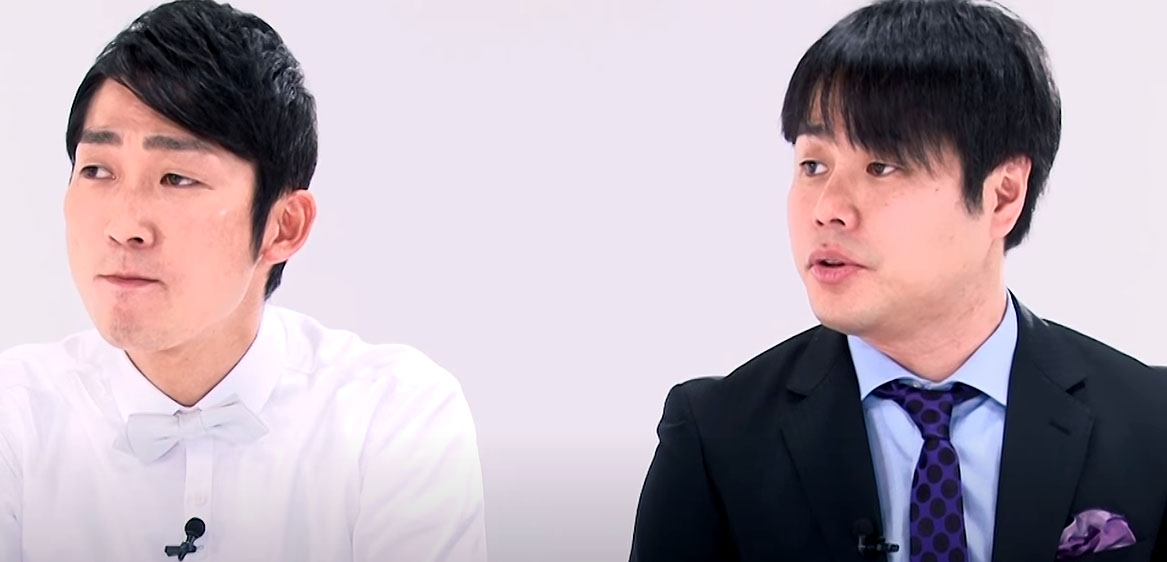
- Employer: Yoshimoto Kogyo

Comedy career
- Years active: 2000–
- Members: Yūsuke Inoue (tsukkomi); Akira Ishida (boke)

Notes
- Same year/generation as: Heisei Nobushi Kobushi; Peace; King Kong; Daian; Ryota Yamasato

Non Style (ノンスタイル; stylized as NON STYLE) is a Japanese owarai duo of Akira Ishida (石田 明, Ishida Akira) as boke and Yūsuke Inoue (井上 裕介, Inoue Yūsuke) as tsukkomi, formed in 2000. The duo has won the championship title in the M-1 Grand Prix 2008 competition. Ishida has since acted as a judge on the competition in 2015 and 2024. The duo belongs to the management company Yoshimoto Kogyo.

== Members ==
Akira Ishida (石田 明, Ishida Akira)
Born February 20, 1980 in Osaka. Plays the boke.
Yūsuke Inoue (井上 裕介, Inoue Yūsuke)
Born March 1, 1980 in Osaka. Plays the tsukkomi.

== Filmography ==
=== Anime ===
List of voice performances in anime
Year	Title	Role	Notes	Source
2020	Maesetsu!	Non Style (Yūsuke Inoue and Akira Ishida)		

== See also ==
- Owarai
- Manzai
