= Kamaitachi (comedy duo) =

Japanese comic duo

- かまいたち
- Employer: Yoshimoto Kogyo

Comedy career
- Years active: 2004–present
- Genres: comic skits, impersonation, manzai comedy
- Members: Kenji Yamauchi, Ryūichi Hamaie
- Website: Official Website

Kamaitachi (かまいたち) is a Japanese comedy duo consisting of Kenji Yamauchi and Ryūichi Hamaie. The duo has been operated by Yoshimoto Kogyo entertainment group since May 2004. The Chinese characters for this duo, originally written as 鎌鼬, were switched into hiragana from April 28, 2009.

== Members ==
Kenji Yamauchi (山内健司), not to be confused with a playwright and film maker sharing the same name, was born in Honjo, Matsue City, Shimane prefecture on January 17, 1981. He graduated from Shimane Prefectural Matsue Higashi High School in 1999 and the Nara University of Education in 2003. He holds a junior high school teacher's license in social studies. His hobbies include shogi and horse racing and also has an Instagram and YouTube channel dedicated to domestic cats. In February 2017 he married and in June of the following year his first son was born. In 2021 he served as a judge in the TBS Television "King of Conte" contest and his second child was born that same year.

Ryūichi Hamaie (濱家隆一) was born in Osaka on November 6, 1983, and attended Osaka Prefectural Ibaraki Higashi High School. In junior high school, he was unruly and repeatedly disciplined. In high school he dyed his hair and neglected to wear his school uniform at times. During his early years as a comedian, he changed partners five times. However, he met Kenji Yamauchi in 2002 and has been with him for over a decade. His hobbies include magic and cooking. Magic is incorporated into some of his performances and his talent has been acknowledged by some professional magicians. According to SakuSaku, since 2009 he has been active in the Sōka Gakkai organization. Hamaie married in 2017 and in 2019, his first daughter was born.

== History ==
Both Yamauchi and Hamaie joined the Osaka NSC entertainment school in the 26th class session in 2002 along with other entertainers such as Wagyu, Fujisaki Market, and Tenjiku Nezumi. Yamauchi used to show off new material every class, but he was in the lowest class. By contrast, Hamaie was at the top class at first yet later demoted to its bottom. He met Yamauchi soon after entering that class and the two exchanged phone numbers.

After graduating from the NSC in 2004, Hamaie broke up with his fifth partner. He then saw Kenji Yamauchi perform well as a single comedian in an audition. Hamaie contacted Yamauchi and they agreed to become a comic duo. The partnership has been rewarding for both of them. They made a lot of TV recordings together in which other famous talents such as Chidori and Gin-Shari have also appeared. In 2012 they won the 33rd ABC Owarai Grand Prix contest sponsored by Asahi TV. In 2017, they won first place in the King of Conte Comedy Tournament. In 2018, they appeared regularly in seven TV shows in the Osaka area. Finally, they moved to Tokyo. In 2019, they entered the M-1 Grand Prix entertainment championship and earned second place. Until 2020, Kamaitachi was the only team to get first place in the "King of Conte" contest and second place in the M-1 Grand Prix contest.

In February 2020, they made a YouTube account named "Neo-Milk-Boy DX." Shortly after that, they changed the name of that account to the "Kamaitachi Channel." As of February 2022, that channel had about 1.59 million subscribers. Around the same time, they decided to create separate YouTube accounts, which became known as the "Hamaitachi Channel" and "Kouchi-san's House of Nyan-Tuber" respectively. In April 2020, their first regular main TV program, dubbed Kamaitachi’s Castle of Pie in the Sky (かまいたちの机上の空論城) hit the airwaves.

== Acting Style ==
This comic duo mainly performs manzai, with some conte now and then. Their most common style follows the standard shabekuri manzai convention of separating roles into a boke and a tsukkomi foil. Yamauchi generally plays the role of boke, often a quarrelsome crazy man, and Hamaie rebuffs him.

Since 2010, they have done many comic performances. During their conte performances, stories frequently blur, and there are many slapstick incidents. At one point during their performances, Yamauchi dressed as a Chinese man and struck a gong while screaming.

Both Yamauchi and Hamaie have been fans of the Japanese rock bank Radwimps for some time and they used their music in their appearances. Later, an exchange on Twitter led to a friendship with lead vocalist Yojiro Noda, and a joint event was held in 2019.
