= M-1 Grand Prix =

Japanese comedy competition

M-1 Grand Prix M-1グランプリ
- Genre: Manzai competition
- Frequency: Annually in December
- Country: Japan
- Years active: 24–25
- Inaugurated: 2001
- Participants: Comedians
- Major events: Manzai, stand-up comedy
- Organiser: Asahi Broadcasting Corporation Television
- Website: m-1gp.com

The M-1 Grand Prix (M-1 グランプリ, Emu-wan Granpuri), formerly known as the Autobacs M-1 Grand Prix (オートバックス 〜M-1グランプリ〜, Ōtobakkusu Emu-wan Guranpuri), is an annual Manzai competition planned by Shinsuke Shimada and run by Yoshimoto Kogyo. The supporter Asahi Broadcasting Corporation broadcasts live throughout Japan via All-Nippon News Network.

As of 2024 it is the most prevalent manzai competition in Japan. The grand prix ended in 2010 and was brought back in 2015 with sponsors including Cygames, Nissin Foods, FamilyMart, Suntory and Uniqlo.

== Entry requirements ==
Before 2010, to qualify as a contestant, the unit must have a career age of 10 years or under. When the competition was brought back in 2015, this limit was changed to 15 years or under. Other than this condition, anyone can enter the competition and reach the televised semifinals and finals if they pass through.

Contestants must go through five rounds of elimination before moving to the televised finals, where only eight units are selected from the semifinals to become finalists. The second chance round was introduced in the 2nd Grand Prix and allows for semi finalists to compete in an additional round competing for an addition spot as the second chance winners in the finals. From 2017 and onward, the total number of finalists increased to nine, plus an additional second chance winner.

The finalists do a lottery draw to determine the entrance order, and are given points out of 100 by each of the judges. After all contestants have performed and points are given, the top three units with the highest points advanced to perform a second time at the grand finals. The judges then do a final vote to crown the winner.

== Locations ==
- Preliminary (Round 1, Round 2, Round 3, Quarterfinal, Semifinal)

from August or September until December
- Round 1 (2001): Sapporo, Sendai, Tokyo, Hamamatsu, Nagoya, Osaka, Takamatsu, Hiroshima, Fukuoka
- Round 1 (2002): Sapporo, Sendai, Tokyo, Yokohama, Nagoya, Osaka, Hiroshima, Fukuoka
- Round 1 (2003-2009): Sapporo, Sendai, Tokyo, Nagoya, Osaka, Hiroshima, Fukuoka
- Round 1 (2010, 2015-): Sapporo, Sendai, Tokyo, Niigata, Nagoya, Osaka, Hiroshima, Matsuyama, Fukuoka
- Round 1 (2015-2021): Sapporo, Sendai, Tokyo, Nagoya, Osaka, Hiroshima, Fukuoka, Naha
- Round 1 (2022, 2024): Sapporo, Sendai, Tokyo, Saitama, Chiba, Nagoya, Osaka, Hiroshima, Fukuoka, Naha
- Round 1 (2023): Sapporo, Sendai, Tokyo, Saitama, Chiba, Shizuoka, Nagoya, Osaka, Hiroshima, Fukuoka, Naha
- Round 1 (2025): Sapporo, Sendai, Tokyo, Saitama, Chiba, Shizuoka, Nagoya, Osaka, Hiroshima, Ehime, Fukuoka, Naha
- Round 2, Round 3, Semifinal (-2009), Quarterfinal (2010, 2015-): Tokyo, Osaka
- Semifinal (2010, 2015-): Tokyo
  - Ryōgoku Kokugikan (2010)
  - EX THEATER ROPPONGI (2015)
  - Yomiuri Hall (2016)
  - NEW PIER HALL (2017-)

- Second Chance Consolation (2002–2010, 2015-)

from noon until 5 p.m. on the day of the finals
aired on Sky A Sports Plus, a satellite broadcasting company owned by ABC (2004-2010)
aired on All-Nippon News Network (2015-)
The winner of the Second Chance Consolation gets a second chance as the final contestant at the M-1 finals
- 2002-2004: special floor in front of Panasonic Center Tokyo
- 2005: Meiji Jingu Stadium
- 2006: Ariake Coliseum
- 2007-2010: Ohi Racecourse
- 2015-2022: Roppongi Hills Arena
- 2023-2024: Shinjuku Sumitomo Building Sankaku Hiroba
- 2025-: EX THEATER ROPPONGI

- Finals

live on TV (All-Nippon News Network, cast nation-wide)
- 2001: Lemon Studio
- 2002-2004: Panasonic Center Ariake Studio
- 2005-2010, 2015-: TV Asahi Headquarters Studio 1

== Winners ==
Year	Winner	Final Votes	Unit Formed	Agency	Total # of Entrants
2001	Nakagawake	6	1992	Yoshimoto Kogyo	1603
2002	Masuda Okada	5	1993	Shochiku Geino	1756
2003	Football Hour	4	1999	Yoshimoto Kogyo	1906
2004	Untouchable	6	1994	Production Jinrikisha	2617
2005	Black Mayonnaise	4	1998	Yoshimoto Kogyo	3378
2006	Tutorial	**7**	1998	Yoshimoto Kogyo	3922
2007	Sandwich Man	4	1998	Flatfive	4239
2008	Non Style	5	2000	Yoshimoto Kogyo	4489
2009	Punk Boo Boo	**7**	2001	Yoshimoto Kogyo	4629
2010	Warai Meshi	4	2000	Yoshimoto Kogyo	4835
2015	Trendy Angel	6	2004	Yoshimoto Kogyo	3472
2016	Ginshari	3	2005	Yoshimoto Kogyo	3503
2017	Toro Salmon	4	2002	Yoshimoto Kogyo	4094
2018	Shimofuri Myōjō	4	2013	Yoshimoto Kogyo	4640
2019	Milk Boy	6	2007	Yoshimoto Kogyo	5040
2020	Magical Lovely	3	2007	Yoshimoto Kogyo	5081
2021	Nishikigoi	5	2012	SMA, Manzai Association	6017
2022	Westland	6	2008	Titan	7261
2023	Reiwa Roman	4	2018	Yoshimoto Kogyo	8540
2024	Reiwa Roman	5	2018	Yoshimoto Kogyo	10330
2025	Takurou	8	2016	Yoshimoto Kogyo	11521

- Under Final Votes, **bold** means it was a unanimous victory, all seven judges voted for that unit as the winner.

== Winner's prize ==
- Winner's prize ¥10,000,000
- Winner's trophy
- Additional prizes Until 2010

- Gift certificates of Car supplies courtesy of Autobacs Seven
- The right to appear CM of Autobacs Seven

- Additional prizes for 2015

- Vacation to Palau courtesy of Cygames
- Champion jacket and commercial deal courtesy of Uniqlo
- Ten years worth of Donbei cup noodles courtesy of Nissin Foods
- 1000 pieces of Family Mart Premium fried chicken courtesy of FamilyMart

- Additional prizes for 2016

- Vacation to Hawaii courtesy of Cygames
- Commercial deal for M-1 no don courtesy of Nissin Foods
- 100 kg of FamilyMart Premium fried chicken courtesy of FamilyMart
- One year worth of The Premium Malts beer courtesy of Suntory

- Additional prizes for 2017

- Luxury vacation to Hawaii courtesy of Cygames
- T Point Card with points to redeem 1 year worth of Donbei cup noodles and FamilyMart Premium fried chicken courtesy of Nissin Foods and FamilyMart
- One year worth of Strong Zero alcoholic beverage courtesy of Suntory

- Additional prizes for 2018

- Tickets for Serie A match with Juventus FC in Turin, Italy courtesy of Cygames
- 100 kg of FamilyMart Premium fried chicken courtesy of FamilyMart
- One year worth of Strong Zero alcoholic beverage courtesy of Suntory
- Chianina beef from Italy with one meal worth of Donbei cup noodles courtesy of Nissin Foods

- Additional prizes for 2019

- Journey to Dubai courtesy of Cygames
- One year worth of Strong Zero alcoholic beverage courtesy of Suntory
- Considering the same amount of money as the other three companies from Nissin Foods → five years worth of NISSIN FOODS products
- One year worth of FamilyMart Premium fried chicken courtesy of FamilyMart

- Additional prizes for 2020

- One head saga beef worth courtesy of Cygames
- One year worth of New Strong Zero Etc. chu-hi alcoholic beverage courtesy of Suntory
- Victory Memorial Statue courtesy of Nissin Foods
- One year worth of FamilyMart Premium fried chicken and Teriyaki roast chicken leg courtesy of FamilyMart

- Additional prizes for 2021

- One head saga beef worth courtesy of Cygames
- One year worth of Strong Zero Etc. chu-hi alcoholic beverage courtesy of Suntory
- One year worth of Gold series four-piece set (Golden hamburg steak, golden shrimp with chili sauce, Golden beef curry, Golden beef stew) courtesy of 7-Eleven
- Leading role for Festive sale &1 year worth of Donbei cup noodles courtesy of Nissin Foods

- Additional prizes for 2022

- One head saga beef worth courtesy of Cygames
- Great mug for party courtesy of Suntory
- The same number of points earned by the new champion in the finals worth of Gold series courtesy of 7-Eleven
- The right to use a helicopter only once between Tokyo and Osaka &1 year worth of Donbei cup noodles courtesy of Nissin Foods

- Additional prizes for 2023
  - 1 year worth chicken of Drive-In Tori and invitation to Saga courtesy of Cygames
  - Japanese headpieces courtesy of Suntory
  - 100 sets of Gold five-piece series (Golden hamburg steak, Golden shrimp with chili sauce, Golden beef curry, golden beef stew, Golden stewed diced pork) courtesy of 7-Eleven
  - 100 year worth Donbei cup noodles for New Year's Eve courtesy of Nissin Foods
- Additional prizes for 2024
  - 1 year worth chicken of Drive-In Tori and invitation to Saga courtesy of Cygames
  - "196" awesome beer mugs for after party courtesy of Suntory
  - Gold five-piece series (Golden hamburg steak, Golden shrimp with chili sauce, Golden beef curry, golden beef stew, Golden stewed diced pork) with the same number of points as the final courtesy of 7-Eleven
  - Donbei All-you-can-eat for one year without charge courtesy of Nissin Foods
- Additional prizes for 2025
  - 1 year worth chicken of Drive-In Tori and invitation to Saga courtesy of Cygames
  - Beer mugs for after party courtesy of Suntory
  - 1500 sets of 15th Anniversary Gold series courtesy of 7-Eleven
  - All new products to be sold next year courtesy of Nissin Foods

== Historic Results ==
- The affiliated agency listed is the unit's agency at the time of the competition

=== 1st M-1 Grand Prix (2001) ===
- The seven judges are: Shinsuke Shimada, Hitoshi Matsumoto, Shoji Kokami, LaSalle Ishii, Koasa Shunpūtei, Yukio Aoshima, Kiyoshi Nishikawa
- The three audience judges are from the cities of: Sapporo, Osaka, Fukuoka

Place	Unit Name Affiliated Agency	Program Subtitle	Entrance Order	Points
Winner	Nakagawake; Yoshimoto (Osaka)	The DNA of Comedy	1st / 1st	829 / 6 Votes
Runners-up	Harigane Rock; Yoshimoto (Osaka)	Martial Artists	10th / 2nd	809 / 1 Vote
3rd	America Zarigani; Shochiku Geino	The 3 Octave Shock	4th	796
4th	Masuda Okada; Shochiku Geino	Ability-ism	8th	770
5th	Kirin; Yoshimoto (Osaka)	Unmarked	7th	741
6th	Football Hour; Yoshimoto (Osaka)	The Miraculous Face	2nd	726
7th	King Kong; Yoshimoto (Osaka)	Astonishing Rookie	6th	707
8th	Tutorial; Yoshimoto (Osaka)	The Onmyoji of Comedy	3rd	637
9th	DonDokoDon; Yoshimoto (Tokyo)	The Uncrowned Kings	9th	614
10th	Ogi Yahagi; Production Jinrikisha	The Star of Tokyo	5th	540

Notes

- Matsumoto gave King Kong a score of 55 while Nishikawa gave them a score of 95, causing a 40-point difference, which is the largest point difference for a single participant
- Nakagawake are the only winners with the first entrance order
- Four of the finalists this year are winners or would go on to become winners in later years, the most ever (Nakagawake, Masuda Okada, Football Hour and Tutorial)

=== 2nd M-1 Grand Prix (2002) ===
- The seven judges are: Shinsuke Shimada, Hitoshi Matsumoto, Makoto Otake, LaSalle Ishii, Yōshichi Shimada, Kausu Nakada, Danshi Tatekawa

Place	Unit Name Affiliated Agency	Finals Appearances	Program Subtitle	Entrance Order	Points
Winner	Masuda Okada; Shochiku Geino	2nd consecutive year	Reaching the Finals with the intention to defeat Yoshimoto	2nd / 3rd	612 / 5 Votes
Runners-up	Football Hour; Yoshimoto (Osaka)	2nd consecutive year	The talented unit that won the newcomer Manzai award	5th / 1st	621 / 2 Votes
3rd	Waraimeshi; Yoshimoto (Osaka)	1st appearance (Unseeded)	The unseeded new stars of M-1	6th / 2nd	567 / 0 Votes
4th	Ogi Yahagi; Production Jinrikisha	2nd consecutive year	The only unit from Tokyo from the last Grand Prix	7th	561
5th	Harigane Rock; Yoshimoto (Tokyo)	2nd consecutive year	The runners-up of last year with burning passion for vengeance	1st	545
6th	Tetsu and Tomo; Nichien Productions	1st appearance (Unseeded)	The new wave of modern music Manzai at M-1	4th	539
7th	Speed Wagon; M2 Company	1st appearance (Unseeded)	(Second Chance Winners)	9th	535
8th	Dienoji; Yoshimoto (Tokyo)	1st appearance	The emotional and heavyweight unit from Oita Prefecture	3rd	534
9th	America Zarigani; Shochiku Geino	2nd consecutive year	Last year's 3rd place that gained traction	8th	525

Notes

- The Second Chance or Consolation Round was introduced this year
- The only year where there were more finalists who are not affiliated with Yoshimoto than those who are (5 to 4)
- All three units in the grand finals became winners in future years

=== 3rd M-1 Grand Prix (2003) ===
- The seven judges are: Shinsuke Shimada, Hitoshi Matsumoto, Kiyotaka Nanbara, Yōshichi Shimada, LaSalle Ishii, Makoto Otake, Kausu Nakada

Place	Unit Name Affiliated Agency	Finals Appearances	Program Subtitle	Entrance Order	Points
Winner	Football Hour; Yoshimoto (Osaka)	3rd consecutive year	Earnest Wish	7th / 3rd	663 / 4 Votes
Runners-up	Waraimeshi; Yoshimoto (Osaka)	2nd consecutive year	∞ (Infinity)	4th / 1st	656 / 3 Votes
3rd	Untouchable; Production Jinrikisha	1st appearance (Unseeded)	(Second Chance Winners)	9th / 2nd	616 / 0 Votes
4th	2Chokenju; Yoshimoto (Tokyo)	1st appearance	The Last Chance	5th	608
5th	Real Kids; Yoshimoto (Osaka)	1st appearance	The Youngest	8th	601
6th	Speed Wagon; Horipro	2nd consecutive year	Straight-on Breakthrough	3rd	572
7th	America Zarigani; Shochiku Geino	3rd consecutive year	The 3rd Time Honesty	6th	564
8th	Kirin; Yoshimoto (Osaka)	2nd appearance	The Second Bloom	2nd	554
9th	Chidori; Yoshimoto (Osaka)	1st appearance	Unmarked	1st	552

Notes

- The restrictions for participation changed from less than 10 years since formation to less than or equals to 10 years since formation
- From this year and forward, judge points became more consistent in the range of the 70s as low and 90s are high
- All three units in the grand finals became winners in future years
- Koji Imada was appointed the MC from this year and onward

=== 4th M-1 Grand Prix (2004) ===
- The seven judges are: Kiyoshi Nishikawa, Kiyotaka Nanbara, Makoto Otake, Yoshichi Shimada, Koasa Shunpūtei, LaSalle Ishii, Kausu Nakada

Place	Unit Name Affiliated Agency	Finals Appearances	Program Subtitle	Entrance Order	Points
Winner	Untouchable; Production Jinrikisha	2nd consecutive year	The Hope of a Breakthrough	8th / 1st	673 / 6 Votes
Runners-up	Nankai Candies; Yoshimoto (Osaka)	1st appearance	There's a First for Everything	5th / 3rd	639 / 1 Vote
3rd	Kirin; Yoshimoto (Osaka)	3rd appearance (2nd consecutive year)	(Second Chance Winners)	9th / 2nd	634 / 0 Votes
4th	Taka and Toshi; Yoshimoto (Tokyo)	1st appearance	Straight Forward Battle	2nd	615
5th	Waraimeshi; Yoshimoto (Osaka)	3rd consecutive year	Unpredictable	7th	615
6th	Poison Girl Band; Yoshimoto (Tokyo)	1st appearance	The Dysfunctional Artists	6th	603
7th	Total Ten Bosch; Yoshimoto (Tokyo)	1st appearance	The Shibuya-kei	4th	587
8th	Tokyo Dynamite; Office Kitano	1st appearance (Unseeded)	The Genes of "Beat"	3rd	583
9th	Chidori; Yoshimoto (Osaka)	2nd consecutive year	Revenge	1st	582

Notes

- Untouchable holds the record for the single highest points attained with 673 points, all judges had given more than 95 points
- The point difference between the 1st place and 2nd place between Untouchable and Nankai Candies are the largest ever at 34 points
- Although Taka and Toshi and Waraimeshi scored the same number of points, the judges determined that Taka and Toshi was better and placed above Waraimeshi

=== 5th M-1 Grand Prix (2005) ===
- The seven judges are: Shinsuke Shimada, Hitoshi Matsumoto, Masayuki Watanabe, Makoto Otake, Yoshichi Shimada, LaSalle Ishii, Kausu Nakada

Place	Unit Name Affiliated Agency	Finals Appearances	Program Subtitle	Entrance Order	Points
Winner	Black Mayonnaise; Yoshimoto (Osaka)	1st appearance	The Counterattack of the Unpopular Men	5th / 3rd	659 / 4 Votes
Runners-up	Waraimeshi; Yoshimoto (Osaka)	4th consecutive year	The Unpredictable Double Boke	1st / 2nd	633 / 3 Votes
3rd	Kirin; Yoshimoto (Osaka)	4th appearance (3rd consecutive year)	The Children of M-1	8th / 1st	646 / 0 Votes
4th	Shinagawa Shoji; Yoshimoto (Tokyo)	1st appearance	The Unwavering Hot Streak	6th	626
5th	Tutorial; Yoshimoto (Osaka)	2nd appearance	The Handsome Manzai Gone Berserk	4th	622
6th	Chidori; Yoshimoto (Osaka)	3rd consecutive year	(Second Chance Winners)	9th	607
7th	Time Machine 3go Upfront Agency	1st appearance	Charismatic Talents from Akihabara	7th	571
8th	Asian; Yoshimoto (Osaka)	1st appearance	Meat and Bone Harmony	2nd	564
9th	Nankai Candies; Yoshimoto (Osaka)	2nd consecutive year	More than Partners, Less than Lovers	3rd	552

Notes

- The finals location was moved to TV Asahi headquarters in Roppongi Hills from this year onward

=== 6th M-1 Grand Prix (2006) ===
- The seven judges are: Shinsuke Shimada, Hitoshi Matsumoto, Kiyotaka Nanbara, Masayuki Watanabe, Yoshichi Otake, Kausu Nakada

Place	Unit Name Affiliated Agency	Finals Appearances	Program Subtitle	Entrance Order	Points
Winner	Tutorial; Yoshimoto (Osaka)	3rd appearance (2nd consecutive year)	The Splendid Idealist	6th / 3rd	664 / 7 Votes
Runners-up	Football Hour; Yoshimoto (Tokyo)	4th appearance	The Returning Champions	2nd / 2nd	640 / 0 Votes
3rd	Kirin; Yoshimoto (Osaka)	5th appearance (4th consecutive year)	The Hungry Fantasistas	4th / 1st	627 / 0 Votes
4th	Waraimeshi; Yoshimoto (Osaka)	5th consecutive year	The Unpredictable Double Boke	8th	626
5th	Total Ten Bosch; Yoshimoto (Tokyo)	2nd appearance	Impressive Shibuya-kei Manzai	5th	613
6th	License; Yoshimoto (Tokyo)	1st appearance	(Second Chance Winners)	9th	609
7th	The Plan 9 Yoshimoto (Osaka)	1st appearance	Revolutionary 5 man Manzai	3rd	597
8th	Henho Chouchou; No agency (Amateur)	1st appearance	Strongest Amateurs of All Time	7th	576
9th	Poison Girl Band; Yoshimoto (Tokyo)	2nd appearance	The Sub-dimensional Manzai Gone Berserk	1st	570

Notes

- For the first and only time ever, amateurs (not signed with any agency or in the industry) made it to the finals (Henho Chouchou)
- For the first and only time ever, a unit of 5 people rather than the traditionally duo Manzai unit made it to the finals (The Plan 9)
- The only year where all finalists were affiliated with Yoshimoto, with the exception of Henho Chouchou who have no agency
- Tutorial are the first winners to win with unanimous votes, the other unanimous winner is Punk Boo Boo in 2009

=== 7th M-1 Grand Prix (2007) ===
- The seven judges are: Shinsuke Shimada, Hitoshi Matsumoto, Emiko Kaminuma, LaSalle Ishii, All Kyojin, Makoto Otake, Kausu Nakada

Place	Unit Name Affiliated Agency	Finals Appearances	Program Subtitle	Entrance Order	Points
Winner	Sandwichman; Flat Five	1st appearance	(Second Chance Winners)	9th / 3rd	651 / 4 Votes
Runners-up	Total Ten Bosch; Yoshimoto (Tokyo)	3rd appearance (2nd consecutive year)	The Impressive Last Chance	5th / 1st	646 / 2 Votes
3rd	King Kong; Yoshimoto (Tokyo)	2nd appearance (Unseeded)	The Returning Super Rookie	6th / 2nd	650 / 1 Vote
4th	Harisenbon; Yoshimoto (Tokyo)	1st appearance (Unseeded)	(Fatty + Skinny) x Ugly = Laugh Out Loud	7th	608
5th	Waraimeshi; Yoshimoto (Osaka)	6th consecutive year	The Unpredictable Double Boke	1st	604
6th	Xabungle; Watanabe Entertainment	1st appearance	The Miraculous Face	3rd	597
7th	Daian; Yoshimoto (Osaka)	1st appearance	The Evening Primrose of Comedy	8th	593
8th	Chidori; Yoshimoto (Osaka)	4th appearance	Manzai of My Way	4th	580
9th	Poison Girl Band; Yoshimoto (Tokyo)	3rd appearance (2nd consecutive year)	The Escape from Humiliation	2nd	577

Notes

- Sandwichman are the first winners to come from the second chance round, the other winner is Trendy Angel in 2015

=== 8th M-1 Grand Prix (2008) ===
- The seven judges are: Shinsuke Shimada, Hitoshi Matsumoto, Emiko Kaminuma, Masayuki Watanabe, All Kyojin, Makoto Otake, Kaausu Nakada

Place	Unit Name Affiliated Agency	Finals Appearances	Program Subtitle	Entrance Order	Points
Winner	NON STYLE; Yoshimoto (Tokyo)	1st appearance	Street Style Manzai	7th / 2nd	644 / 5 Votes
Runners-up	Audrey; K Dash Stage	1st appearance	(Second Chance Winners)	9th / 3rd	649 / 2 Votes
3rd	Knights; Maseki Geinosha	1st appearance	The Star of Asakusa	4th / 1st	640 / 0 Votes
4th	Waraimeshi; Yoshimoto (Osaka)	7th consecutive year	The Lone Double Boke	2nd	637
5th	Uji Koji; Ammy Park	1st appearance	I ♥ Tochigi	5th	623
6th	Daian; Yoshimoto (Osaka)	2nd consecutive year	The Evening Primrose of Comedy	1st	619
7th	Monster Engine; Yoshimoto (Osaka)	1st appearance	Surreal and High-power Manzai	3rd	614
8th	King Kong; Yoshimoto (Tokyo)	3rd appearance (2nd consecutive year)	The Counterattack of the Super Rookies	8th	612
9th	The Punchi; Yoshimoto (Tokyo)	1st appearance	The Last Chatcha Chance	6th	591

Notes

- The only year where all 3 grand finalists had appeared for the 1st time ever as a finalist
- NON STYLE are the first winners that was formed post 2000
- Aya Ueto was appointed as the assistant MC from this year onward

=== 9th M-1 Grand Prix (2009) ===
- The seven judges are: Shinsuke Shimada, Hitoshi Matsumoto, Emiko Kaminuma, Hideo Higashikokubaru, All Kyojin, Masayuki Watanabe, Kausu Nakada

Place	Unit Name Affiliated Agency	Finals Appearances	Program Subtitle	Entrance Order	Points
Winner	Punk Boo Boo; Yoshimoto (Tokyo)	1st appearance	The Earnest 9th Year	8th / 2nd	651 / 7 Votes
Runners-up	Waraimeshi; Yoshimoto (Osaka)	8th consecutive year	The Lone Double Boke	5th / 3rd	668 / 0 Votes
3rd	NON STYLE; Yoshimoto (Tokyo)	2nd consecutive year	(Second Chance Winners)	9th / 1st	641 / 0 Votes
4th	Knights; Maseki Geinosha	2nd consecutive year	The Star of Asakusa	2nd	634
5th	Haraichi; Watanabe Entertainment	1st appearance	Born in Haraichi, Raised in M-1	5th	628
6th	Tokyo Dynamite; Yoshimoto (Tokyo)	2nd appearance	The Counterattack of the Odd-ones Out	1st	614
7th	Monster Engine; Yoshimoto (Osaka)	2nd consecutive year	The Precision Machine of Comedy	3rd	610
8th	Nankai Candies; Yoshimoto (Tokyo)	2nd appearance	The Red Thread in the name of Manzai	8th	607
9th	Harisenbon; Yoshimoto (Tokyo)	2nd appearance	Manzai Comedians in Love	6th	595

Notes

- Punk Boo Boo became the second unanimous winner after Tutorial in 2006
- Punk Boo Boo won The Manzai 2011, just two years later as the only unit to win both competitions
- Waraimeshi received the highest points by a single judge ever with 100 points from Shinsuke Shimada

=== 10th M-1 Grand Prix (2010) ===
- The seven judges are: Shinsuke Shimada, Hitoshi Matsumoto, Kiyotaka Nanbara, Kazuki Otake, Masayuki Watanabe, Hiroyuki Miyasako, Kausu Nakada

Place	Unit Name Affiliated Agency	Finals Appearances	Program Subtitle	Entrance Order	Points
Winner	Waraimeshi; Yoshimoto (Tokyo)	9th consecutive year	The Lone Double Boke	6th / 2nd	668 / 4 Votes
Runners-up	Slim Club; Yoshimoto (Tokyo)	1st appearance	Unmarked Islanders	3rd / 1st	644 / 3 Votes
3rd	Punk Boo Boo; Yoshimoto (Tokyo)	2nd consecutive year	(Second Chance Winners)	9th / 3rd	668 / 0 Votes
4th	Peace; Yoshimoto (Tokyo)	1st appearance (Unseeded)	Artisans of Comedy	8th	629
5th	Ginshari; Yoshimoto (Osaka)	1st appearance	The New Generation that Embraces Showa	4th	627
6th	Knights; Maseki Geinosha	3rd consecutive year	The Star of Asakusa	5th	626
7th	Haraichi; Watanabe Entertainment	2nd consecutive year	Evolved and Unreasonable Manzai	7th	620
8th	Jaru Jaru; Yoshimoto (Osaka)	1st appearance	Super Rookie	2nd	606
9th	Canaria; Yoshimoto (Tokyo)	1st appearance	Fly! Last Chance	1st	592

Notes

- Waraimeshi has been a finalist every single year since 2002, marking 9 consecutive years as the finalists and the most finals appearances ever
- This was the final M-1 Grand Prix before the 5-year hiatus

=== 11th M-1 Grand Prix (2015) ===
- This is the first M-1 Grand Prix in 5 years since 2010
- The 9 judges are all past winners of every M-1 Grand Prix except 2004:
  - Reiji (Nakagawake), Hidehiko Masuda (Masuda Okada), Nozomu Iwao (Football Hour), Takashi Yoshida (Black Mayonnaise), Yoshimi Tokui (Tutorial), Takeshi Tomizawa (Sandwichman), Akira Ishida (Non Style), Tetsuo Sato (Punk Boo Boo), Tetsuo (Waraimeshi)

Place	Unit Name Affiliated Agency	Finals Appearances	Program Subtitle	Entrance Order	Points
Winner	Trendy Angel; Yoshimoto (Tokyo)	1st appearance (Unseeded)	(Second Chance Winners)	9th / 2nd	825 / 6 Votes
Runners-up	Ginshari; Yoshimoto (Osaka)	2nd consecutive grand prix	The New Generation that Embraces Showa Once Again!	6th / 1st	818 / 2 Votes
3rd	Jaru Jaru; Yoshimoto (Osaka)	2nd consecutive grand prix	The Freestyle Doesn't Stop!	5th / 3rd	834 / 1 Vote
4th	Time Machine 3go Ohta Production	2nd appearance	Do You Like a Fatty with Proficiency	8th	816
5th	Super Maradona; Yoshimoto (Osaka)	1st appearance (Unseeded)	The Little Lamb Boke Rolls Out!	3rd	813
6th	Wagyu; Yoshimoto (Osaka)	1st appearance (Unseeded)	It Pains the Heart! The Distorted Love of the Boke	4th	806
7th	Maple Chogokin; Sun Music Productions	1st appearance (Unseeded)	The Ultra Dark Horse that No One Knows	1st	796
8th	Bakayo Anataha; Office Kitano	1st appearance (Unseeded)	Calm and Poison Tongue Manzai	2nd	791
9th	Haraichi; Watanabe Entertainment	3rd consecutive grand prix	Sawabe Will Stir It Up Today as Well	7th	788

Notes

- Revived after 5 years since 2010
- Restrictions changed from within 10 years formed to within 15 years formed
- There are 9 judges in total and each judge is the past winner of every M-1 Grand Prix except 2004 (Untouchable)
- Trendy Angel are the second winners to come from the second chance round after Sandwichman in 2007
- All units at least received a 90 or above from a single judge

=== 12th M-1 Grand Prix (2016) ===
- The 5 judges are: Emiko Kaminuma, Hitoshi Matsumoto, Daikichi Hakata, Reiji (Nakagawake), All Kyojin

Place	Unit Name Affiliated Agency	Finals Appearances	Program Subtitle	Entrance Order	Points
Winner	Ginshari; Yoshimoto (Osaka)	3rd consecutive grand prix	Traditional Manzai	4th / 3rd	470 / 3 Votes
Runners-up	Wagyu; Yoshimoto (Osaka)	2nd consecutive grand prix	(Second Chance Winners)	9th / 2st	469 / 1 Vote
3rd	Super Maradona; Yoshimoto (Osaka)	2nd consecutive grand prix	Weakling x Strongest	7th / 1st	459 / 1 Vote
4th	Saraba Seishun no Hikari; The Morihigashi	1st appearance	Unpredictable	8th	448
5th	Akina; Yoshimoto (Osaka)	1st appearance (Unseeded)	Phantasmagoria	1st	446
6th	Haraichi; Watanabe Entertainment	4th consecutive grand prix	Shin・Haraichi	6th	446
7th	Kaminari; Grape Company	1st appearance (Unseeded)	Dark Horse	2nd	441
8th	Slim Club; Yoshimoto (Tokyo)	2nd appearance (Unseeded)	One Shot Kill	5th	441
9th	Aiseki Start; Yoshimoto (Tokyo)	1st appearance	Marriage Type Manzai	3rd	436

Notes

- Although units received the same number of points, their position is determined by the number of judges were higher points, for example Akina received higher points by 3 judges over Haraichi, which is the majority, marking them above Haraichi in placement
- The only time when the same unit entry number has made it to the finals in two consecutive years (Kaminari is entry number 73 this year, which was Wagyu's entry number last year)

=== 13th M-1 Grand Prix (2017) ===
- The seven judges are: Emiko Kaminuma, Hitoshi Matsumoto, Daikichi Hakata, Koasa Shunputei, Reiji (Nakagawake), Masayuki Watanabe, All Kyojin

Place	Unit Name Affiliated Agency	Finals Appearances	Program Subtitle	Entrance Order	Points
Winner	Toro Salmon; Yoshimoto (Tokyo)	1st appearance	It's Finally Here!	3rd / 1st	645 / 4 Votes
Runners-up	Wagyu; Yoshimoto (Osaka)	3rd consecutive grand prix	A Earnest 3rd Time	9th / 3rd	653 / 3 Votes
3rd	Miki; Yoshimoto (Osaka)	1st appearance	Brother Manzai	8th / 2nd	650 / 0 Votes
4th	Kamaitachi; Yoshimoto (Tokyo)	1st appearance	To Become the First Ever Dual Champions	5th	640
4th	Super Maradona; Yoshimoto (Osaka)	3rd consecutive grand prix	(Second Chance Winners)	4th	640
6th	Jaru Jaru; Yoshimoto (Tokyo)	3rd appearance	The Returning Freestyle	10th	636
7th	Sayaka; Yoshimoto (Osaka)	1st appearance (Unseeded)	Unmarked	7th	628
8th	Universe; Yoshimoto (Tokyo)	1st appearance	The Wild Woman x The Indoors Man	1st	626
9th	Kaminari; Grape Company	2nd consecutive grand prix	The Evolving Hard Hitting Manzai	2nd	618
10th	Magical Lovely Yoshimoto (Tokyo)	1st appearance	Profound and Mysterious	6th	607

Notes

- From this year onward, there are nine finalists and one second chance winner, for a total of ten finalists, one more than past years
- For the first time, a unit was runners-up in consecutive years (Wagyu)
- It was determined from this year onward, that units with the same points will have the same placement regardless of point details

=== 14th M-1 Grand Prix (2018) ===
- The seven judges are: Emiko Kaminuma, Hitoshi Matsumoto, Takeshi Tomizawa (Sandwich Man), Shiraku Tatekawa, Nobuyuki Hanawa (Knights), Reiji (Nakagawake), All Kyojin

Place	Unit Name Affiliated Agency	Finals Appearances	Program Subtitle	Entrance Order	Points
Winner	Shimofuri Myojo; Yoshimoto (Osaka)	1st appearance	The Endless Freedom	9th / 3rd	662 / 4 Votes
Runners-up	Wagyu; Yoshimoto (Tokyo)	4th consecutive grand prix	The 4th Form	10th / 2nd	656 / 3 Votes
3rd	Jaru Jaru; Yoshimoto (Tokyo)	4th appearance (2nd consecutive year)	Freestyle Returns Again	4th / 1st	648 / 0 Votes
4th	Miki; Yoshimoto (Osaka)	2nd consecutive grand prix	(Second Chance Winners)	7th	638
4th	Kamaitachi; Yoshimoto (Osaka)	2nd consecutive grand prix	To Become the First Ever Dual Champions	3rd	636
6th	Tom Brown; K Dash Stage	1st appearance (Unseeded)	No Rules	8th	633
7th	Super Maradona; Yoshimoto (Osaka)	4th consecutive grand prix	The Final Comeback	2nd	617
8th	Gallop; Yoshimoto (Osaka)	1st appearance (Unseeded)	Shine! Ibushi Silver	5th	614
9th	Mitorizu; Yoshimoto (Osaka)	1st appearance	The High Pitched Dark Horse	1st	606
10th	Universe; Yoshimoto (Tokyo)	2nd consecutive grand prix	This Year is also "Yeah!"	6th	594

Notes

- Shimofuri Myojo are the first winners that were born in the Heisei era and post 1990s, they were also the youngest winners ever at the age of 25 and 26
- Wagyu are the second unit to make it to top-3 in the finals three times in a row after Kirin, and are the only unit to be runners-up three times in a row

=== 15th M-1 Grand Prix (2019) ===
- The seven judges are: Emiko Kaminuma, Hitoshi Matsumoto, Takeshi Tomizawa, Shiraku Tatekawa, Nobuyuki Hanawa, Reiji (Nakagawake), All Kyojin

Place	Unit Name Affiliated Agency	Finals Appearances	Program Subtitle	Entrance Order	Points
Winner	Milk Boy; Yoshimoto (Osaka)	1st appearance (Unseeded)	Naniwa Spiral	7th / 3rd	681 / 6 Votes
Runners-up	Kamaitachi; Yoshimoto (Tokyo)	3rd consecutive grand prix	Possessive Manzai	2nd / 2nd	660 / 1 Vote
3rd	Pekopa; Sun Music Productions	1st appearance (Unseeded)	Revolutionary Tsukkomi	10th / 1st	654 / 0 Votes
4th	Wagyu; Yoshimoto (Tokyo)	5th consecutive grand prix	(Second Chance Winners)	3rd	652
5th	Mitorizu; Yoshimoto (Osaka)	2nd consecutive grand prix	Opposite Personalities	6th	649
6th	Karashi Renkon; Yoshimoto (Osaka)	1st appearance	Strength of the Fire Nation	5th	639
7th	Oswald; Yoshimoto (Tokyo)	1st appearance (Unseeded)	New Tokyo Style	8th	638
8th	Suehirogarizu; Yoshimoto (Tokyo)	1st appearance (Unseeded)	Traditional Technique of Reiwa	4th	637
9th	Indians; Yoshimoto (Tokyo)	1st appearance	Non-Stop	9th	632
10th	New York; Yoshimoto (Tokyo)	1st appearance (Unseeded)	Manzai Joker	1st	616

Notes

- This is the first M-1 Grand Prix to take place in the Reiwa period and the last of the decade of 2010s
- With a total number of entrants at 5040, this is the first time there have been over 5000 total participants in the Grand Prix
- For the first time, the judges are the same as last year
- For the first time since the 8th M-1 Grand Prix (2008), a Manzai duo that is not affiliated with Yoshimoto makes it into the top 3 finals
- The winner, Milk Boy's 681 points is the highest in the history of the Grand Prix, beating out Untouchable's previous record of 673

=== 16th M-1 Grand Prix (2020) ===
- The seven judges are: Emiko Kaminuma, Hitoshi Matsumoto, Takeshi Tomizawa, Shiraku Tatekawa, Nobuyuki Hanawa, Reiji (Nakagawake), All Kyojin

Place	Unit Name Affiliated Agency	Finals Appearances	Program Subtitle	Entrance Order	Points
Winner	Magical Lovely; Yoshimoto (Tokyo)	2nd appearance	Unique Style Berserk Mode	6th / 2nd	649 / 3 Votes
Runners-up	Oideyasu Koga; Yoshimoto (Tokyo)	1st appearance (Unseeded)	The Harmony of Technique and Personality	5th / 3rd	658 / 2 Vote
3rd	Mitorizu; Yoshimoto (Osaka)	3rd consecutive grand prix	The Talent of the Opposites III	4th / 1st	648 / 2 Votes
4th	Nishikigoi; SMA	1st appearance	Idiot Old Men	9th	643
5th	New York; Yoshimoto (Tokyo)	2nd consecutive grand prix	Revenge on the Dark	3rd	642
6th	Oswald; Yoshimoto (Tokyo)	2nd consecutive grand prix	Neo Tokyo Style	7th	642
7th	Indians; Yoshimoto (Tokyo)	2nd consecutive grand prix	(Second Chance Winners)	1st	625
8th	Akina; Yoshimoto (Osaka)	2nd appearance	The Awaken Fantasista	8th	622
9th	Westland; Titan	1st appearance	The Angry Howl of the Small Citizen	10th	622
10th	Tokyo Hoteison; Grape Company	1st appearance	Quiet Boke Strong Tsukkomi	2nd	617

Notes

- With a total number of entrants at 5081, this is the most entrants in the history of the grand prix
- The judges are the same for the third year in a row
- The first grand prix where a unit of two solo comedians made it to the finals (Oideyasu Koga, unit of Oideyasu Oda and Kogaken)
- The winner, Magical Lovely, placed last in the 2017 M-1 Grand Prix finals and won in their second appearance in three years, going from last to first

=== 17th M-1 Grand Prix (2021) ===
- The seven judges are: Emiko Kaminuma, Hitoshi Matsumoto, Takeshi Tomizawa, Shiraku Tatekawa, Nobuyuki Hanawa, Reiji (Nakagawake), All Kyojin

Place	Unit Name Affiliated Agency	Finals Appearances	Program Subtitle	Entrance Order	Points
Winner	Nishikigoi; SMA	2nd appearance	50years old idiot's big adventure	8th / 2nd	655 / 4 Votes
Runners-up	Oswald; Yoshimoto (Tokyo)	2nd appearance	Shin・Tokyo style	6th / 3rd	665 / 1 Vote
3rd	Indians; Yoshimoto (Osaka)	3rd consecutive grand prix	Rapid Boke express	9th / 1st	655 / 1 Votes
4th	Long Coat Daddy; Yoshimoto (Osaka)	1st appearance	Soft Hard	7th	649
5th	Momo; Yoshimoto (Osaka)	1st appearance (Unseeded)	Naniwa New Face	10th	645
6th	Shinku Jessica; Production Jinrikisha	1st appearance (Unseeded)	Refraction Elite	5th	638
7th	Universe; Yoshimoto (Tokyo)	3rd consecutive	NO M-1, NO LIFE.	3rd	638
8th	Mogurider; Maseki Geinosha	1st appearance (Unseeded)	Naughty and Clumsy	1st	637
9th	Haraichi; Watanabe Entertainment	5th appearance	(Second Chance Winners)	4th	636
10th	Ranjatai; Grape Company	1st appearance	Extreme Of Bizarre	2nd	628

Notes

- From this year, the sponsor has changed from FamilyMart to 7-eleven
- With a total number of entrants at 6017, this is the most entrants in the history of the grand prix
- The judges are the same for the fourth year in a row
- For the first time since the 7th M-1 Grand Prix (2007), a Manzai duo that is not affiliated with Yoshimoto makes it win

=== 18th M-1 Grand Prix (2022) ===
- The seven judges are: Hitoshi Matsumoto, Reiji (Nakagawake), Shiraku Tatekawa, Takeshi Tomizawa, Nobuyuki Hanawa, Daikichi Hakata, Kuniko Yamada

Place	Unit Name Affiliated Agency	Finals Appearances	Program Subtitle	Entrance Order	Points
Winner	Westland; Titan	2nd appearance (Unseeded)	The Angry Howl of the Small Citizen	10th / 1st	659 / 6 Votes
Runners-up	Sayaka; Yoshimoto (Osaka)	2nd appearance	Hot Blooded revenge	5th / 3rd	667 / 1 Vote
3rd	Long Coat Daddy; Yoshimoto (Osaka)	2nd appearance	Gently Hybrid	4th / 2nd	660 / 0 Votes
4th	Dansei Buranko; Yoshimoto (Tokyo)	1st appearance	Dangerous Sober Man	6th	650
5th	Shinku Jessica; Production Jinrikisha	2nd appearance	Uncontrollable	2nd	647
6th	Yoneda 2000; Yoshimoto (Tokyo)	1st appearance	Good Friends Fantastic	8th	638
7th	Oswald; Yoshimoto (Tokyo)	4th consecutive	(Second Chance Winners)	3rd	639
8th	Kabe Poster; Yoshimoto (Osaka)	1st appearance	Passive Logic	1st	634
9th	Q Titan	1st appearance	No Real	9th	620
10th	Diamond; Yoshimoto (Tokyo)	1st appearance (Unseeded)	Crazy Sparkle	7th	616

Notes

- With a total number of entrants at 7261, this is the most entrants in the history of the grand prix
- For the first time, a Manzai duo that is not affiliated with Yoshimoto makes it win for the 2nd year in a row

=== 19th M-1 Grand Prix (2023) ===
- The seven judges are: Hitoshi Matsumoto, Reiji (Nakagawake), Tomoko Unabara, Takeshi Tomizawa, Nobuyuki Hanawa, Daikichi Hakata, Kuniko Yamada

Place	Unit Name Affiliated Agency	Finals Appearances	Program Subtitle	Entrance Order	Points
Winner	Reiwa Roman; Yoshimoto (Tokyo)	1st appearance	Eccentric Rookie	1st / 1st	648 / 4 Votes
Runners-up	Yarlens; K Dash Stage	1st appearance	Non-stop annoyance	6th / 2nd	656 / 3 Votes
3rd	Sayaka; Yoshimoto (Osaka)	3rd appearance (2nd consecutive)	Passionate Revenge	3rd / 3rd	659 / 0 Votes
4th	Mayurika; Yoshimoto (Tokyo)	1st appearance	Weird Friends Forever	5th	645
5th	Shinku Jessica; Production Jinrikisha	3rd consecutive	Uncontrollable III	7th	643
6th	Kabe Poster; Yoshimoto (Osaka)	2nd consecutive	Passive Logical Monster	4th	635
7th	Mogurider; Maseki Geinosha	2nd appearance	Major Useless	10th	632
8th	Danviramucho; Yoshimoto (Tokyo)	1st appearance	M-Pop	8th	631
9th	Shishigashira; Yoshimoto (Tokyo)	1st appearance	(Second Chance Winners)	2nd	627
10th	Kurage; Yoshimoto (Tokyo)	1st appearance	Pure Y-shirt and Aloha shirt	9th	620

Notes

- With a total number of entrants at 8540, this is the most entrants in the history of the grand prix

=== 20th M-1 Grand Prix (2024) ===
- The nine judges are: Reiji (Nakagawake), Tomoko Unabara, Hidetsugu Shibata (Untouchable), Kenji Yamauchi (Kamaitachi), Akira Ishida (Non Style), Masayasu Wakabayashi (Audrey), Tetsuo (Waraimeshi), Nobuyuki Hanawa (Knights), Daikichi Hakata

Place	Unit Name Affiliated Agency	Finals Appearances	Program Subtitle	Entrance Order	Points
Winner	Reiwa Roman; Yoshimoto (Tokyo)	2nd consecutive	Champion	1st / 2nd	850 / 5 Votes
Runners-up	Batteries; Yoshimoto (Osaka)	1st appearance	Naniwa's Straight-ahead	7th / 3rd	861 / 3 Votes
3rd	Shinku Jessica; Jinrikisha	4th consecutive	Uncontrollable IV	3rd / 1st	849 / 1 Votes
4th	Evers; Yoshimoto (Tokyo)	1st appearance	Chatting Fantasista	9th	848
5th	Yarlens; K Dash Stage	2nd consecutive	Revenge Non-stop annoyance	2nd	825
6th	Tom Brown; K Dash Stage	2nd appearance	Last No Rules	10th	823
7th	Daitaku; Yoshimoto (Tokyo)	1st appearance	Only One Twins	5th	820
7th	Mayurika; Yoshimoto (Tokyo)	2nd consecutive	(Second Chance Winners)	4th	820
9th	Jock Rock; Yoshimoto (Osaka)	1st appearance	Roaring Dark Horse	6th	819
10th	Mamatarte; Sun Music	1st appearance	Extremely Huge	8th	812

Notes

- For the first time in history, Reiwa Roman won the grand prix for the second consecutive year
- With a total number of entrants at 10330, this is the most entrants in the history of the grand prix

=== 21st M-1 Grand Prix (2025) ===
- The nine judges are: Reiji (Nakagawake), Tomoko Unabara, Hidetsugu Shibata (Untouchable), Tetsuo (Waraimeshi), Terumoto Goto (Football Hour), Kenji Yamauchi (Kamaitachi), Nobuyuki Hanawa (Knights), Takashi Komaba (Milk Boy), Daikichi Hakata

Place	Unit Name Affiliated Agency	Finals Appearances	Program Subtitle	Entrance Order	Points
Winner	Takurou; Yoshimoto (Osaka)	1st appearance	Weak Star	7th / 3rd	861 / 8 Votes
Runners-up	Don Décolleté; Yoshimoto (Tokyo)	1st appearance	Claims of Forty	8th / 1st	845 / 1 Votes
3rd	Evers; Yoshimoto (Tokyo)	2nd consecutive	Chatting Fantasista	4th / 2nd	870 / 0 Votes
4th	Shinku Jessica; Jinrikisha	5th appearance	Uncontrollable V	5th	844
5th	Yarlens; K Dash Stage	3rd consecutive	Endless annoyance	1st	843
6th	Gokai Captain; Yoshimoto (Osaka)	1st appearance	Preaching Gorilla Attacks	9th	839
7th	Kaname Stone; Maseki Geinosha	1st appearance	(Second Chance Winners)	3rd	830
8th	Yoneda 2000; Yoshimoto (Tokyo)	2nd consecutive	Welcome back, fantastic	6th	826
9th	Mamatarte; Sun Music	2nd consecutive	Well then, you should gain weight	10th	823
10th	Maison; Yoshimoto (Tokyo)	1st appearance	Passion Full Throttle	2nd	820

Notes

- With a total number of entrants at 11521, this is the most entrants in the history of the grand prix

== Masters of ceremony ==
GP	MC and Assistant MC(s)	Others
1	Shinsuke Shimada, Yasuhiko Akasaka, Rei Kikukawa	
2	Kiyoshi Nishikawa, Kōichi Yamadera, Emiri Nakayama	Interviewer: Yuichi Kimura
3	Koji Imada, Kiyoshi Nishikawa, Eiko Koike	Interviewer: Yuichi Kimura
4	Koji Imada, Waka Inoue	Interviewer: Yuichi Kimura; Lottery Draft Special Guest: Saori Yoshida
5	Koji Imada, Eiko Koike	Interviewer: Yuichi Kimura
6	Koji Imada, Kaori Manabe	Interviewer: Yuichi Kimura
7	Koji Imada, Eiko Koike	Interviewer: Yuichi Kimura
8	Koji Imada, Aya Ueto	Interviewer: Yuichi Kimura
9	Koji Imada, Aya Ueto	Interviewer: Yuichi Kimura
10	Koji Imada, Aya Ueto	Interviewer: Yuichi Kimura
11	Koji Imada, Aya Ueto	Second Chance Round Reporter: Ayumi Hirodo (Asahi Broadcasting Corporation announcer); Second Chance Round MC: Tomonori Jinnai
12	Koji Imada, Aya Ueto	Second Chance Round Reporter: Ayumi Hirodo (Asahi Broadcasting Corporation announcer); Second Chance Round MC: Tomonori Jinnai
13	Koji Imada, Aya Ueto	Second Chance Round Reporter: Ayumi Hirodo (Asahi Broadcasting Corporation announcer); Second Chance Round MC: Tomonori Jinnai
14	Koji Imada, Aya Ueto	Second Chance Round Voting Reporter: Ayumi Hirodo (Asahi Broadcasting Corporation announcer); Waiting Room Reporter: Trendy Angel; Second Chance Round MC: Tomonori Jinnai, Chiaki Horan
15	Koji Imada, Aya Ueto	M-1 Reporter: Akira Kawashima (Kirin) Waiting Room Reporter: Ayumi Hirodo, Riho Tsuda (Both Asahi Broadcasting Corporation announcers) Second Chance Round MC: Tomonori Jinnai, Yua Shinkawa
16	Koji Imada, Aya Ueto	M-1 Report: Ayumi Hirodo (Asahi Broadcasting Corporation announcer) Waiting Room Reporter: Riho Tsuda, Yuji Nakamura (Both Asahi Broadcasting Corporation announcers) Second Chance Round MC: Tomonori Jinnai, Marie Iitoyo
17	Koji Imada, Aya Ueto	M-1 Report: Ayumi Hirodo (Asahi Broadcasting Corporation announcer) Waiting Room Reporter: Riho Tsuda (Asahi Broadcasting Corporation announcers) Second Chance Round MC: Tomonori Jinnai, Nanase Nishino
18	Koji Imada, Aya Ueto	M-1 Report: Ayumi Hirodo (Asahi Broadcasting Corporation announcer) Second Chance Round Reporter: Chihiro Washio (Asahi Broadcasting Corporation announcers) Second Chance Round MC: Tomonori Jinnai, Ayumi Hirodo (Asahi Broadcasting Corporation announcer)
19	Koji Imada, Aya Ueto	M-1 Report: Mami Saito (Asahi Broadcasting Corporation announcer) Second Chance Round Reporters: Saori Masuda (Asahi Broadcasting Corporation announcers), Oideyasu Oda Second Chance Round MC: Tomonori Jinnai, Nanase Nishino Second Chance Round Judges: Hidetsugu Shibata (Untouchable), Crystal Noda (Magical Lovely), Takashi Watanabe (Nishikigoi), Kenji Yamauchi (Kamaitachi), Akira Ishida (Non Style)
20	Koji Imada, Aya Ueto	M-1 Report: Misaki Onita (Asahi Broadcasting Corporation announcer) Second Chance Round Reporters: Oideyasu Oda Second Chance Round MC: Tomonori Jinnai, Asuka Saito Second Chance Round Judges: Hiroyuki Iguchi (Westland), Kazunobu Kubota (Toro Salmon), Tsukasa Saito (Trendy Angel), Crystal Noda (Magical Lovely), Takashi Watanabe (Nishikigoi)
21	Koji Imada, Aya Ueto	M-1 Report: Misaki Onita (Asahi Broadcasting Corporation announcer) Second Chance Round Reporters: Oideyasu Oda Second Chance Round MC: Tomonori Jinnai, Kyoko Saito Second Chance Round Judges: Hiroyuki Iguchi (Westland), Kazunobu Kubota (Toro Salmon), yusuke (daian), Crystal Noda (Magical Lovely), Takashi Watanabe (Nishikigoi)

== Event hiatus ==
On December 12, 2010, Yoshimoto Kogyo and ABC announced that "M-1 Grand Prix" would end in the year and they will start the project to succeed the event.

The event restarted in 2015 with different sponsors and is no longer officially titled "Autobacs M-1 Grand Prix", but simply ''M-1 Grand Prix''.
