= Shimofuri Myojo =

Japanese comedy duo

- Shimofuri Myōjō (霜降り明星)
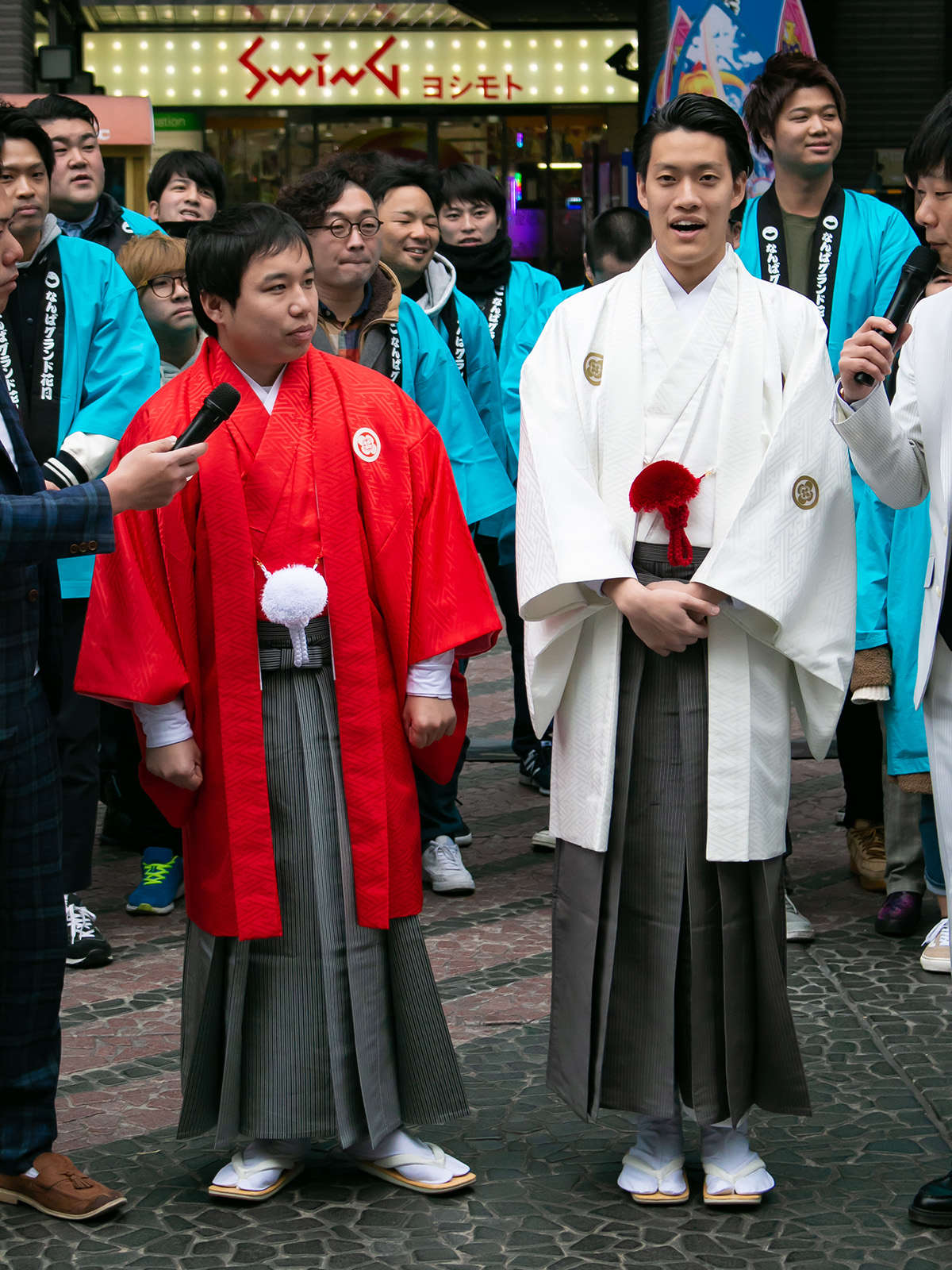
- Seiya and Soshina, 2018
- Employer: Yoshimoto Kogyo

Comedy career
- Years active: 2013–present
- Genre: Manzai
- Members: Seiya (Boke); Soshina (Tsukkomi)

Notes
- Same year/generation as: Colocolo Chikichiki Peppers; Kaminari; Hanako; Universe; Ike Nwala

Shimofuri Myojo (霜降り明星, Shimofuri Myōjō) is a Japanese comedy duo (kombi) consisting of Seiya (せいや) and Soshina (粗品). They are employed by Yoshimoto Kogyo, and are mainly active in Tokyo and Osaka. Although they did not attend Yoshimoto NSC, their debut coincides with the 33rd generation class from Osaka. They are the winners of the 14th M-1 Grand Prix in 2018.

Shimofuri Myojo are the youngest ever to win the M-1 Grand Prix, the duo rose to popularity in Tokyo after becoming champions and are currently active on television and theater. Alongside groups such as Hanako and Yonsen Toshin, Shimofuri Myojo is considered one of the leading comic teams of the 7th Generation of Owarai.

== Members ==
- Seiya (せいや), real name Seiya Ishikawa (石川 晟也) Born September 13, 1992 in Higashiōsaka, Osaka. Plays the boke. He is a graduate of Kindai University with a degree in literature.
- Soshina (粗品), real name Naoto Sasaki (佐々木 直人) Born January 7, 1993 in Chūō-ku, Osaka. Plays the tsukkomi. He attended Doshisha University but dropped out to focus on his career in comedy. Soshina is the first person to win both the M-1 Grand Prix and R-1 Grand Prix in 2018 and 2019 respectively.

== Life and career ==
Both Seiya and Soshina have had prior experience in the comedy industry before they officially debuted as a comedy duo. Seiya performed manzai on television in elementary school and also had appearances on television when he was considered as an amateur comedian in middle school. Soshina competed in R-1 Grand Prix in 2010 as a high school student using the name Soshina, making it to the second round. Around that same time, he also administered an oogiri website.

=== High School Manzai ===
Before meeting Seiya, Soshina formed an amateur comedy duo in 2009 with his high school friend called Spade. They entered High School Manzai 2009 and succeeded in reaching the finals as the representatives for the Kansai region. The duo rose to popularity among high school students in Osaka, and Soshina became known to Seiya, who was attending another high school and had no connection to Soshina at the time. The popularity of Spade inspired Seiya to enter High School Manzai 2010, with the goal of defeating Spade.

Seiya and Soshina met each other in person for the first time on August 11, 2010, at the High School Manzai 2010 Kansai region preliminary held at the Aeon Mall Takanohara. Seiya formed a duo called Tori, and performed well, gaining recognition at the competition. However, both Spade and Tori did not make it past the semi-finals. The representative and finalist for the Kansai region that year was Stand Box, with Naoto Ikeda, who later formed the comedy duo Rainbow and became a member of Yoshimotozaka46.

In the final year of their high school, both of their units were dissolved and both Seiya and Soshina entered the All Japan High School Comedy- Owarai Inter-High 2011 competition as solo comedians. The two met each other once again after both of them made the finals. It was around this time that Soshina began to recognize Seiya's talents.

=== University and formation ===
Seiya went on to attend Kindai University and Soshina to Doshisha University. Soshina became active as an amateur comedian, appearing on and winning the 2012 All That's Manzai televised competition held by MBS TV as the youngest winner at age 19. He passed the audition to enter Yoshimoto Kogyo as an affiliated comedian in just the first year of university, which lead to his decision to drop out and focus on comedy.

Soshina continued activities as a solo comedian during that time while Seiya had aspirations to become a teacher. Although he had achieved some success solo, Soshina sought after a comedic partner and believed Seiya was the perfect candidate. Soshina actively invited and attempted to convince Seiya into forming a comedy duo with him. Although Seiya was uncertain for a while, he ended up accepting the invitation and the two formed the unit known as Shimofuri Myojo.

The name Shimofuri Myojo was thought up by both Seiya and Soshina, with Shimofuri by Seiya and Myojo by Soshina. Shimofuri (霜降り) translates literally to "marbled", as Seiya chose the word because he thinks it sounds good. Myojo (明星) translates literally as "bright star", chosen by Soshina. Initially, Soshina said Myojo was chosen because he wanted something that sounded bright, as the opposite of how his personality is (Soshina proclaims that he himself is rather gloomy and dark). However, it was later known that the main inspiration for the name comes from a character called Shiranui Akeno Myojo (不知火 明乃 明星) from the anime Seto no Hanayome, which Soshina was into at the time.

The duo was officially formed in January 2013.

=== Career as a duo ===
The duo won the 2017 ABC Comedy Grand Prix and became regulars on the variety show Atarashii Nami 24, which later became AI-TV produced and broadcast by Fuji TV.

In 2018, the duo made it as a finalist and were the winners of the 2018 M-1 Grand Prix, becoming nationally recognized and appearing in numerous television shows as regulars, including being given their own program.
