= Heisei Nobushi Kobushi =

Japanese comedy duo

- Heisei Nobushi Kobushi (平成ノブシコブシ)
- Other name: ex-name: Kobushi to Zangi (コブシトザンギ)
- Employer: Yoshimoto Kōgyō

Comedy career
- Years active: 2000–
- Genre: Manzai
- Members: Takashi Yoshimura (Boke); Kenta Tokui (Tsukkomi)

Notes
- Same year/generation as: Peace; King Kong; Non Style; Ryota Yamasato; Audrey

Heisei Nobushi Kobushi (平成ノブシコブシ, Heisei Nobushi Kobushi) is a Japanese comedy duo (kombi) consisting of Takashi Yoshimura (吉村崇) and Kenta Tokui (徳井健太) who have performed in a number of television shows. They are employed by Yoshimoto Kogyo and are mostly active in Tokyo.

== Members ==
- Takashi Yoshimura (吉村崇) Born September 16, 1980 in Nishi-ku, Sapporo, Hokkaido. Plays the boke. Graduated from Hokkaido Sapporo Teine High School. The main writer of the unit's material is Yoshimura for both manzai and conte.
- Kenta Tokui (徳井健太) Born July 9, 1980 in Chiba, raised in Betsukai, Nemuro, Hokkaido. Plays the tsukkomi. Graduated from Hokkaido Betsukai High School. After divorcing his previous wife, Shūkan Bunshun reported in June 2022 that Tokui married musician and model Ena Fujita earlier that spring.

== History ==
In the 5th generation class of Yoshimoto New Star Creation, Yoshimura and Tokui formed the kombi in 2000. Before their formation, Yoshimura had already been in 7 different units before and Tokui had been in 4, all of which were dissolved.

In 2005, Heisei Nobushi Kobushi formed an informal comedy group with Hiking Walking, Peace, and Ishibashi Hazama called La Golisters on the variety program Toryumon F. Activities of La Golisters were infrequent as the group has not been active since 2010.

Heisei Nobushi Kobushi had a breakthrough in 2006 in the TV program Yarisugi Koji hosted by Koji Imada and Koji Higashino. Yoshimura's armpit neta gag was a huge success and brought the unit to popularity. In July of the same year, their personal live show at the LUMINE the Yoshimoto theater sold out in the first 5 minutes (around 500 tickets), the fastest in the theater's history.

Yoshimura in particular rose to popularity and is one of the most active comedians in television as of 2019. Tokui did not gain the same amount of traction as Yoshimura, and the unit gets more work as separate talents than together.
