= Jichō Kachō =

Japanese comedy duo

- Jichō Kachō (次長課長)
- Employer: Yoshimoto Kogyo

Comedy career
- Years active: 1994–
- Members: Satoshi Inoue (Tsukkomi); Junichi Kōmoto (Boke)

Notes
- Same year/generation as: Black Mayonnaise; Yoshimi Tokui (Tutorial); Shampoo Hat

Jichō Kachō (次長課長) is a Japanese comedy unit (kombi) consisting of two comedians (お笑い芸人, owarai geinin), Jun'ichi Kōmoto (河本準一) and Satoshi Inoue (井上聡). Sometimes also known as Jikachō (次課長), they are one of the most popular owarai kombi coming from Yoshimoto Kōgyō in Tokyo. Their name literally means "Vice manager, Section manager", and is a reference to the titles of two visitors at the bar in which they were working part-time before they were discovered by Yoshimoto. They were originally a three-man group with the name Jichō Kachō Shachō (次長課長社長), or "Vice Manager, Section Manager, President", but after the third member of the group left, the name was reduced to its current version.

Kōmoto is the boke of the duo, and the much quieter Inoue is the tsukkomi. Both comedians are natives of Okayama. Inoue has a reputation among owarai geinin for being handsome, and he has scored high on Yoshimoto's "handsomest geinin ranking" for the last five years. Kōmoto is most famous for his strange faces and high-pitched character voices, although he is also a very talented singer, and is well respected by other owarai geinin for his skills. He is often heard squealing the line "From me you get no tanmen!" (お前に食わせるタンメンはねぇ!, Omae ni kuwaseru tanmen wa nee!). In March 2003, Kōmoto married Naomi Shigemoto (former Osaka Performance Doll member), and they now have a son.

Kōmoto appeared in the NTV drama, 14-year-old Mother, playing the uncle of the 14-year-old pregnant girl. He is currently active in the idol group Yoshimotozaka46.
