= Wagyu (comedy duo) =

Japanese comedy duo

- 和牛 (Wagyū)
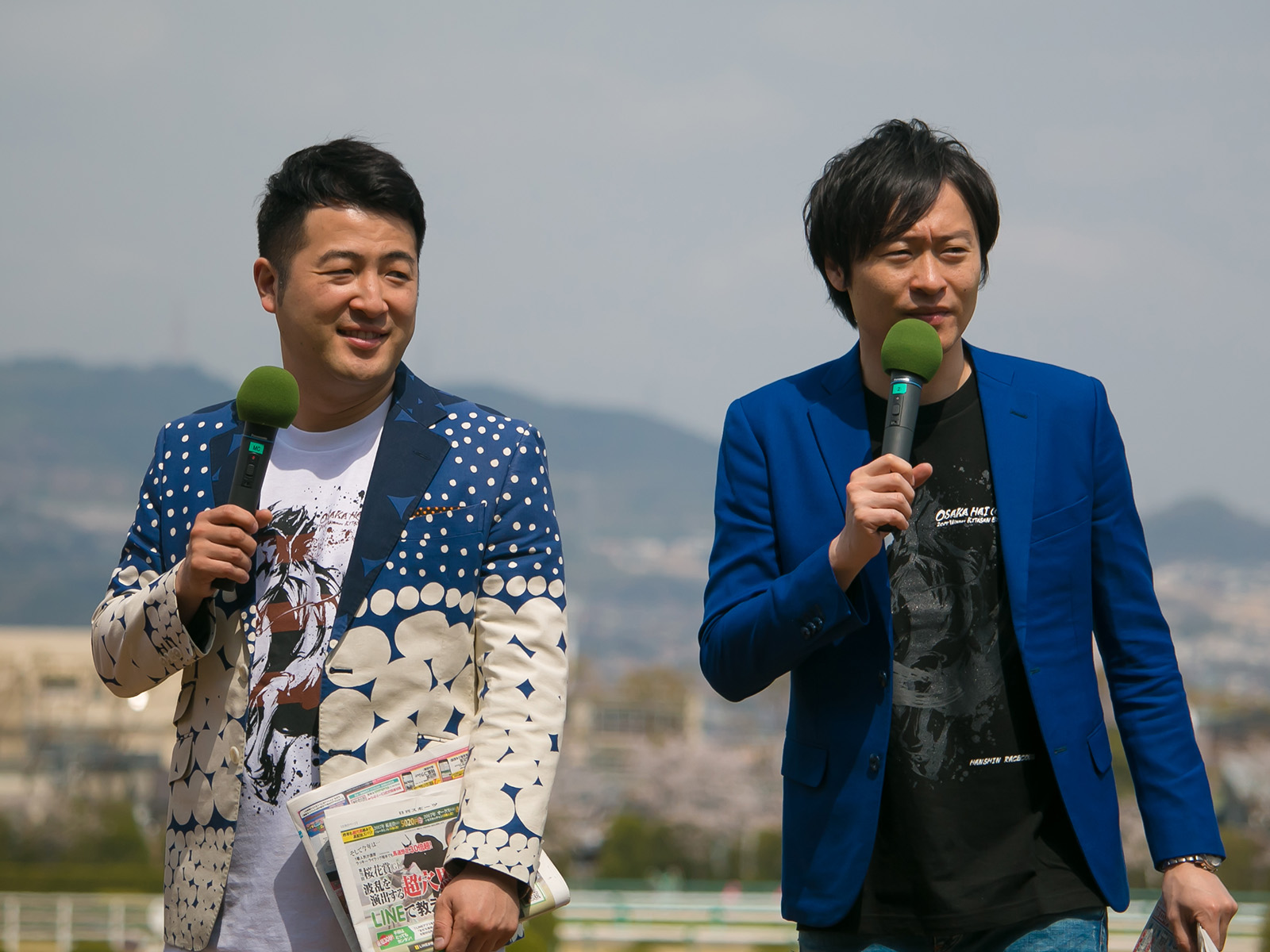
- Employer: Yoshimoto Kogyo

Comedy career
- Years active: 2006–2024
- Genres: Manzai; Conte
- Members: Shinji Mizuta (Boke); Kenshiro Kawanishi (Tsukkomi)

Notes
- Same year/generation as: Kamaitachi; Tenjiku Nezumi; Fujisaki Market; Akina; Einstein; Bike Kawasaki Bike

Wagyu named after the Japanese beef cattle with the same name (和牛, Wagyū) was a Japanese comedy duo (konbi) consisting of Shinji Mizuta (水田信二) and Kenshirō Kawanishi (川西賢志郎). They are employed by Yoshimoto Kogyo, and are mainly active in Tokyo. They were the runners-up of the M-1 Grand Prix for three years in a row from 2016 to 2018.

They disbanded on March 31, 2024.

== Members ==
- Shinji Mizuta (水田 信二), Born April 15, 1980 in Iyo, Ehime. Plays the boke. Mizuta worked as a chef for 7 seven years in Osaka and Kobe before becoming a comedian. He was appointed as the sightseeing ambassador of his hometown Iyo, Ehime in 2018.
- Kenshirō Kawanishi (川西 賢志郎), Born January 29, 1984 in Higashiōsaka, Osaka. Plays the tsukkomi. Kawanishi played rugby throughout middle school and university in the fly-half (stand-off) position.

== Life and career ==
Both Mizuta and Kawanishi were graduates of the Yoshimoto NSC Osaka's 26th generation class. They formed Wagyu in 2006 and spent the first year and a half struggling for performance opportunities in live theatres.

From 2008 to 2012, Wagyu gained popularity through various manzai and comedy competitions, making it to the semi-finals in the M-1 Grand Prix 2009 and King of Conte 2010. In 2013, Wagyu became regulars on various variety programs and were known mainly for their manzai, which got them to the finals of The Manzai in 2014 and M-1 Grand Prix in 2015.

Wagyu's popularity increased in 2016 after again making it to the finals of M-1 Grand Prix by winning the Second Chance competition. They were the fastest selling young comedians of Yoshimoto with live tickets often sold out instantly. They then moved to Tokyo to further their career in 2017, and held live tours across the country. They were finalists in M-1 Grand Prix in 2017 and 2018, marking 4 consecutive years as a finalist and 3 consecutive runners-up from 2016 to 2018.

On December 12, 2023, they announced that they would disband at the end of March 2024, citing a disparity in enthusiasm for comedy. Mizuta cited personal struggles with performance demands and unresolved creative differences with Kawanishi. Kawanishi noted issues of trust, triggered by Mizuta’s repeated tardiness, and their diverging visions for manzai (Japanese stand-up) performances.
