= Taka and Toshi =

Japanese manzai (stand-up) comedy duo

- Taka ando Toshi (タカアンドトシ)
- Other names: Taka, Toshi (タカ・トシ)
- Employer: Yoshimoto Kōgyō

Comedy career
- Years active: 1995– (formed in Sapporo)
- Members: Toshikazu Miura (Tsukkomi); Takahiro Suzuki (Boke)

Taka and Toshi (タカアンドトシ, Taka ando Toshi) is a Japanese manzai (stand-up) comedy duo (konbi) from Sapporo consisting of Takahiro Suzuki (鈴木 崇大; 4/3/1976-) a.k.a. "Taka" as boke and Toshikazu Miura (三浦 敏和; 7/17/1976-) a.k.a. "Toshi" as tsukkomi. They are under contract to the entertainment agency, Yoshimoto Kogyo. Formed in 1994, they are best known for their stand-up acts and as TV tarentos in variety shows.

== Sketch comedy ==
As the boke, Taka is prone to silly comments, while Toshi is the more reasonable of the two, often criticizing Taka's remarks, shooting tsukkomi saying "such-and-such ka!" (i.e. "Ōbei ka!"), and hitting Taka on the head for his silly response.

"Ōbei ka!" (pronounced "oh-bay-ka!") is their most known tsukkomi gag. It is a sarcastic way of saying, “Are you Western?"

One example of their skits has the following lines:
Toshi: Let's have a drink. I'll have a beer.
Taka: Then I'll have a Diet Coke.
Toshi: You're not an American! Have a beer! And what would you like to eat?
Taka: I'll have a cherry pie.
Toshi: You're not an American!
Taka: A meat pie.
Toshi: You're not an American!
Taka: A chocolate bar.
Toshi: You're not an American!
Taka: Sushi and tempura! (with an American accent).
Toshi: You're not an American!

== Manzai ==
Taka and Toshi also perform manzai stand-up comedy, implementing similar routines and gags into their stand-up material, often resembling their sketch material and gags. In 2004, they reached the final of the M-1 Grand Prix and finished in 4th place.

== Biography ==
The comedians first met in 1990 at Nishioka-kita Junior High in Sapporo when they were both in the 8th grade. In 1994, they passed an audition held by Yoshimoto Kogyo. Initially working in Sapporo, the two moved to Tokyo in 2002 to work nationwide.

== Members ==
Takahiro "Taka" Suzuki (鈴木 崇大 / タカ, Suzuki Takahiro / Taka)

- Date of Birth: April 3, 1976
- Birthplace: Sapporo, Hokkaido
- Manzai Role: Boke

Toshikazu "Toshi" Miura (三浦 敏和 / トシ, Miura Toshikazu / Toshi)

- Date of Birth: July 17, 1976
- Birthplace: Asahikawa, Hokkaido
- Manzai Role: Tsukkomi

== Awards ==
- Nationwide Yoshimoto Young Manzai-shi Awards presented by Television Shizuoka (テレビ静岡主催 全国吉本若手漫才) 1st place (1997)
- The 10th Warai no Kin-medal - Neta Battle (笑いの金メダル - ネタバトル) Gold medal (2004)
- M-1 Grand Prix (M-1グランプリ) 4th place (2004)
- The 7th Bakushō On-air Battle Championship (爆笑オンエアバトルチャンピオン大会) 1st place (2005)
- The 8th Bakushō On-air Battle Championship (爆笑オンエアバトルチャンピオン大会) 1st place (2005)
- The 45th Golden Arrow Awards, Broadcasting Award (Variety Section) (2008)
- The 8th Beat Takeshi's Entertainment Awards, Japan Show Biz Award (2008)

== Media ==
=== TV ===
Regular

- Monday
  - Otameshika! (お試しかっ!) -- TV Asahi
  - Hoko Tate (ほこ×たて) -- Fuji TV
- Tuesday
  - Waratte Iitomo! (森田一義アワー 笑っていいとも!) -- Fuji TV
  - Jimoto Ōen Variety Konohen!! Traveler (地元応援バラエティ このへん!!トラベラー) -- HTB
  - Gyōten Quiz! Chin Rule Show (仰天クイズ! 珍ルールSHOW) -- TV Tokyo
- Wednesday
  - Futtonda (フットンダ) -- Chūkyō TV
- Thursday
  - Iknari! Ōgon Densetsu. (いきなり!黄金伝説。) -- TV Asahi
- Friday
  - Game & Quiz Variety Peke Pon (ゲーム&クイズバラエティ ペケ×ポン) -- Fuji TV
  - Gekkan Soccer Earth -- Nippon TV *Every 4th Friday
- Saturday
  - Tensai! Shimura Dōbutsuen (天才!志村どうぶつ園) -- Nippon TV
- Sunday
  - Waratte Iitomo! Zōkan-gō (笑っていいとも!増刊号) -- Fuji TV
  - Dōda! Presents Taka Toshi Bokujō (どぉーだ! Presents タカトシ牧場) -- Hokkaido Cultural Broadcasting

Semi Regular

- SmaStation—TV Asahi *Saturday
- SMAP×SMAP -- Kansai TV, Fuji TV *Monday
- Tunnels no Mina-san no Okage Deshita (とんねるずのみなさんのおかげでした) -- Fuji TV *Thursday

Irregular

- Taka Toshi & Nukumizu ga Iku Chiisana Tabi Series (タカトシ&温水が行く小さな旅シリーズ) -- Fuji TV
- Special Program Bakushō Sokkuri Monomane Kōhaku Utagassen Special (爆笑そっくりものまね紅白歌合戦スペシャル) -- Fuji TV
