= Tutorial (comedy duo) =

Japanese comedy duo

- Chūtoriaru (チュートリアル)
- Employer: Yoshimoto Kogyo

Comedy career
- Years active: 1998–
- Genres: Manzai, conte
- Members: Yoshimi Tokui (Boke); Mitsunori Fukuda (Tsukkomi)

Notes
- Same year/generation as: Kirin; Sandwich Man; Total Ten Bosch

Tutorial (Japanese: チュートリアル, Hepburn: Chūtoriaru) is a Japanese comedy duo consisting of Yoshimi Tokui (徳井義実) and Mitsunori Fukuda (福田充徳). They are employed by Yoshimoto Kogyo and are currently active in Tokyo. Tutorial is the winner of the 2006 M-1 Grand Prix and have been prominent comedians making frequent appearances on TV ever since.

The unit name "Tutorial" comes from the tutorial sessions Tokui and Fukuda attended when they enrolled in a cram school after failing their university entrance exams. Tokui writes all of the group's material.

== Members ==
- Yoshimi Tokui (徳井義実) Born April 16, 1975. Plays the boke. Studied at Hanazono University, but dropped out and joined Yoshimoto Kogyo's New Star Creation school of comedy. Tokui is also an actor. Beginning with season 3 of Terrace House: Boys × Girls Next Door on April 12, 2013, Tokui became a studio commentator on the reality TV series Terrace House. He continued this role on each installment of the franchise until episode 25 of Terrace House: Tokyo 2019–2020. His absence is due to the revelation in October 2019 that he did not report around ¥118 million that he earned between 2016 and 2018 on his income taxes.
- Mitsunori Fukuda (福田充徳) Born August 11, 1975. Plays the tsukkomi. The younger son of his family, his parents worked as civil servants. Fukuda graduated from Osaka Gakuin University with an economics major.

== History ==
Both were born in 1975 and grew up in Sakyō-ku, Kyoto. The two met each other at the age of 5 in kindergarten, and have been friends since. They went to the same kindergarten, elementary school, middle school and high school. Both of them took a year off after failing their university entrance exams and enrolled at the same cram school. The year after, Tokui entered Hanazono University and Fukuda entered Osaka Gakuin University.

In 1995, Tokui dropped out of Hanazono University and joined Yoshimoto Kogyo's NSC comedy academy in Osaka at the invitation of a friend. They formed the comedy unit "Tutorial", but before their graduation as the 13th generation class, Tokui's friend dropped out and decided not to pursue a career in comedy, leading to the unit's disbandment with Tokui going back to university. During this time, Tokui was also working as a model as a part-time job.

After hearing about the disbandment of Tokui's unit, Fukuda promptly invited Tokui to form their own comedy duo. Although Tokui had accepted the invitation, the two of them did not officially form and begin activities until March, 1998. Their unit name would still be "Tutorial". During this time, Fukuda was able to successfully graduate with a university degree while Tokui dropped out once again due to poor grades and the fact that they would be pursuing their careers as comedians either way.

The kombi's first stage performance was in May of 1998 at Shinsaibashisuji Nichome Theater at a special event held for rookies. The unit found steady success with multiple regular TV appearances and their first gig as MCs in Tokyo in 2004.

Tutorial won the 2006 M-1 Grand Prix as the first winners with unanimous votes. They saw huge success and flourished in Tokyo because of this, and both of them moved to Tokyo in the latter half of 2007, where their careers continued to grow. As of 2019, they continue to hold many regular TV spots, appearances and gigs and are prominent figures in the industry.

Tokui was sidelined in October 2019 after revelations he failed to report $1 million in income generated by his company over three years. In a public apology, he said he never intended to conceal his earnings. He said he wished to remain in the entertainment industry. However, in a statement, Yoshimoto Kogyo said Tokui would indefinitely refrain from performing.

== Achievements ==
- The 21st ABC Newcomer Comedian Grand Prix (2000) - Newcomer Excellence Award
- The 1st M-1 Grand Prix (2001) - Finalist, 8th place
- The 31st Kamigata Comedy Grand Prix (2002) - Newcomer Award
- The 33rd NHK Kamigata Manzai Contest (2003) - Excellence Award
- The 32nd Kamigata Comedy Grand Prix (2003) - Newcomer Award
- The 39th Kamigata Manzai Grand Prix (2004) - Newcomer Award
- The 5th M-1 Grand Prix (2005) - Finalist, 5th place
- The 6th M-1 Grand Prix (2006) - Finalist, Winner
