= Harisenbon =

Female Japanese comedy duo

- Harisenbon (ハリセンボン)
- Employer: Yoshimoto Kogyo (- 2023)→GATE (2024 - Present)

Comedy career
- Years active: 2004–
- Genres: Manzai; Conte
- Members: Haruna Kondo (Tsukkomi); Haruka Minowa (Boke)

Notes
- Same year/generation as: Eiko Kano; Shizzle; Ryotaro Kan (Panther)

Harisenbon (ハリセンボン, Harisenbon) is a female Japanese comedy duo (kombi) consisting of Haruna Kondo (近藤春菜) and Haruka Minowa (箕輪はるか) who have featured in a number of television shows. They are employed by Yoshimoto Kogyo, and are mainly active in Tokyo. They graduated from Yoshimoto NSC's 9th generation class and are referred to as Harisen for short.

== Members ==
- Haruna Kondo (近藤 春菜), Born February 23, 1983, in Komae, Tokyo. Plays the tsukkomi (sometimes boke). She is a graduate of Toho Gakuen College of Drama and Music with a specialization in Japanese culture studies.
- Haruka Minowa (箕輪 はるか), Born January 1, 1980, in Fuchū, Tokyo. Plays the boke (sometimes tsukkomi). She is a graduate of Waseda University, Faculty of Letters, Arts and Sciences with a specialization in humanities.

== Life and career ==
The duo met each other in the Yoshimoto NSC academy and formed the unit in 2003, debuting the next year in 2004. In 2005, the group joined a theatre unit for Yoshimoto called Gekidan Guts with other newcomer comedians. Later that same year, the unit saw major success through appearances on various variety and comedian audition television programs.

In 2007 and 2009, Harisenbon made it as a finalist at M-1 Grand Prix.

In the following years, Harisenbon became one of the most popular female comedy duos, with numerous appearances per year on television. On December 27, 2023, they left Yoshimoto Kogyo and signed with GATE on January 1, 2024.

== Media ==
This list consists of only media appearances made by the duo when they appear together as Harisenbon.

=== Television ===
==== Current regular programs ====
- Ningen Kansatsu Variety - Monitoring (ニンゲン観察バラエティ モニタリング) (TBS TV) (2013–Present)
- Tensai! Shimura Doubutsuen (天才!志村どうぶつ園) (Nippon TV)
- Shiawase! Bonbīgāru (幸せ!ボンビーガール) (Nippon TV)
- Bakushou Mondai no Shinkai WANTED (爆笑問題の深海WANTED) (TV Shizuoka)
- Nichiyou Chaplin (にちようチャップリン) (TV Tokyo) (2017–Present)

==== Dramas ====
- Lion-Maru G (ライオン丸G) (TV Tokyo) (2006) as Haruna and Haruka
- Marumaru Chibi Maruko-chan (まるまるちびまる子ちゃん) (Fuji TV) (2007)
- 24jikan Atatamemasuka? ~Shippuudotō Konbiniden~ (24時間あたためますか?〜疾風怒涛コンビニ伝〜) (Nippon TV) (2008)
- Kamen Rider OOO (仮面ライダーオーズ/OOO) (TV Asahi) (2011)

=== Commercials ===
- Cream Genmai Bran (Asahi Foods, 2009)
- Meiko Gijuku - Narration
- Hotto Motto - alongside Katsura Bunshi VI
- Kyushu Shinkansen (Kyushu Railway Company, 2012) - alongside Morisanchu
- Leopalace21 (2012) - alongside Maki Horikita
- Yomeishu Seizo Company (2013)
- Round One Entertainment (2014)
- Manulife Life Insurance (Manulife, 2014)
- Big Hero 6 (Disney, 2015)
- Gyu-Kaku (2017)
- Daito Trust Construction (2017) - alongside Hinako Sakurai
