= Harisen =

Large paper fan

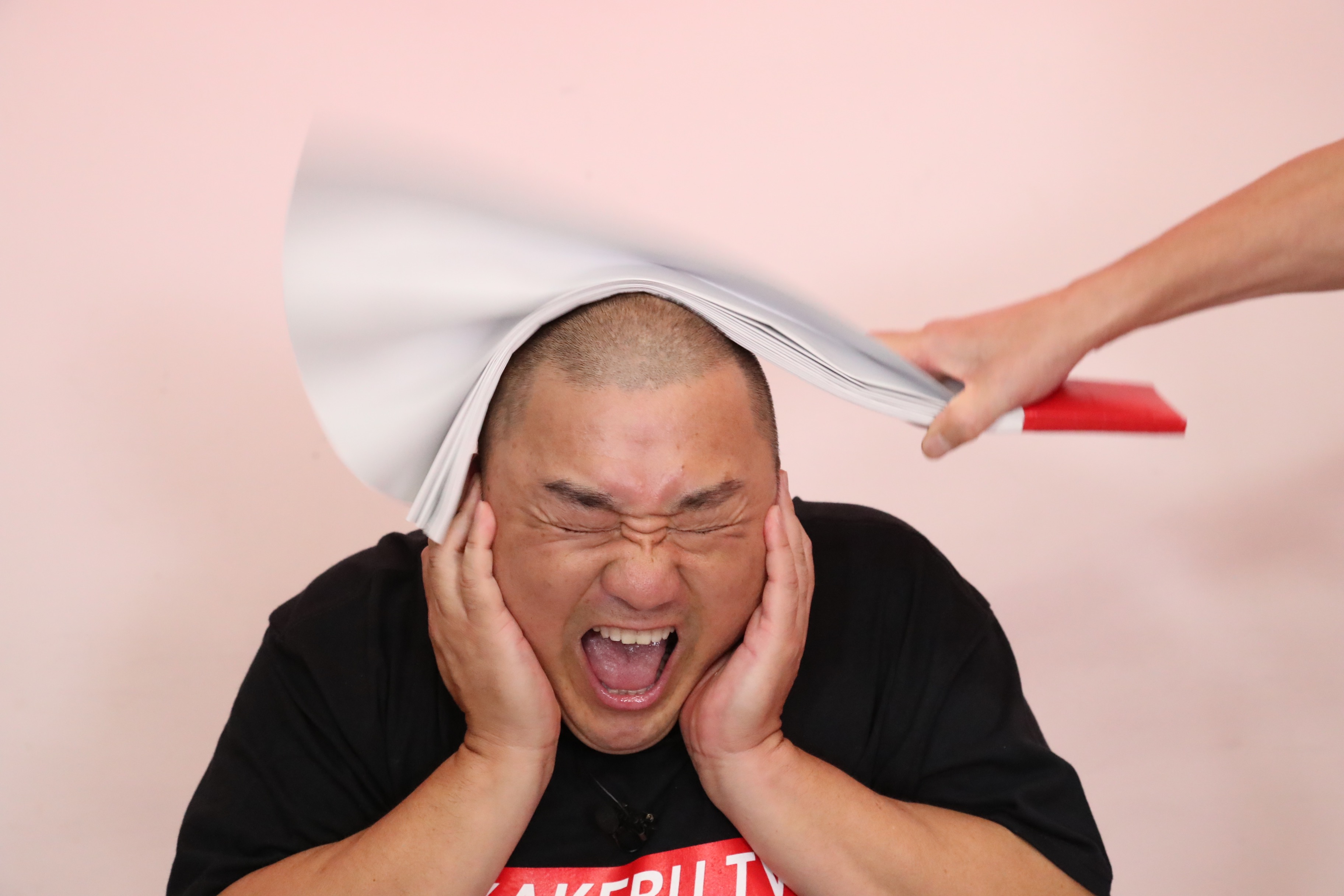
Keiichi Yamamoto of Gokuraku Tombo being hit with a harisen

The harisen (ハリセン/張り扇, meaning "slapping fan") is a giant paper fan, usually made in a closed fashion. It is most traditionally used as part of a manzai act, in which the straight man (tsukkomi) smacks the funny man (boke) in response to their jokes or idiocy.

== In popular culture ==
- The Japanese version of the video game Banjo-Tooie localizes Banjo & Kazooie's collective "Breegull Bash" attack (in which Banjo pulls Kazooie out of his backpack and slams her like a club) as "Harisen Kazooie".
- The character Kazuo Kiriyama is given a harisen in the movie Battle Royale.
- Kaname Chidori of the anime Full Metal Panic! uses a harisen that she seems to pull out from hammerspace to stop Sousuke Sagara from doing anything that could injure or kill a civilian in Tokyo; at one point, her harisen is seen to be extendable and takes up as much space as a matchbox.
- In the manga Negima!, character Asuna Kagurazaka wields a giant sword-sized harisen that later transforms into an enormous single-edged sword.
- The character Dr. Eto in the series Nodame Cantabile is known by the nickname "Harisen" because he uses one to punish his students.
- In the video game Persona 5, the characters can use an ability called "Harisen Recovery", in which they use a giant harisen to heal status effects inflicted on fellow party members.
- In the video game series Super Smash Bros. up until Super Smash Bros. Brawl, a large fan (called "Harisen" in the Japanese version, but simply "Fan" in the English version) is a usable item. Characters can wield it as a very fast weapon, causing minimal but repeated and nigh-unstoppable damage to enemy characters. The item's trophy in Brawl mentions its origin as a manzai prop. Additionally, in Super Smash Bros. Ultimate, Banjo & Kazooie's aforementioned "Breegull Bash" attack returns as a part of their moveset, with director Masahiro Sakurai making a remark during a September 2019 presentation for Banjo & Kazooie about the move's Japanese name being "Harisen Kazooie" while also mentioning its original English name.
- In the video game Rhapsody: A Musical Adventure, the characters Kururu and Cornet have a manzai-like dynamic, wherein Kururu will sometimes smack Cornet with a harisen for comedic effect.
