= Kaze, Slow Down =

- DVD cover
- Directed by: Shinsuke Shimada
- Starring: Yasushi Ishida; Izumi Igarashi; Seiki Nagahara; Tadashi Nishikawa
- Release date: November 23, 1991 (Japan)
- Running time: 107 minutes
- Country: Japan
- Language: Japanese

Kaze, Slow Down (Japanese: 風、スローダウン) is a 1991 Japanese film directed by Shinsuke Shimada.

== Cast ==
- Yasushi Ishida
- Izumi Igarashi
- Seiki Nagahara
- Tadashi Nishikawa

== Reception ==
It was chosen as the 7th Best Film at the 13th Yokohama Film Festival.
