= Shinsuke Shimada =

Japanese comedian and television presenter

- Born: Kimihiko Hasegawa; March 24, 1956 (age 70); Kyoto, Kyoto Prefecture, Japan
- Occupations: Comedian, television presenter
- Years active: 1974-2011

Shinsuke Shimada (島田紳助, Shimada Shinsuke) is a Japanese comedian and television presenter. He first became popular as part of a manzai duo formed with his on-stage partner Matsumoto Ryusuke. The duo was active between 1976 and 1985.

In 1991 he directed the film Kaze, Slow Down.

Shimada played an important role for keeping the popularity for contemporary manzai alive - for many years he was the driving force behind the popular manzai competition M-1 Grand Prix.

On August 23, 2011, Shinsuke Shimada announced his retirement after admitting to extensive ties to the yakuza, Japan's organized crime. The yakuza's dominance in the entertainment industry was a subject that has long been a taboo.

== See also ==
- The Deal (Japanese game show)
