= Nininbaori =

Nininbaori (二人羽織) is a Japanese comedic party trick where two people wear the same large coat (haori) and pretend to be one (hunchbacked) person. One person is the "face" and the other is the "arms". Humor arises from the arms never being coordinated with the face.

This type of skit is considered a staple of Japanese comedy and is commonly used as a part of comedy shows; live stage performances, owarai (television comedy), and rakugo.

The basic concept of nininbaori-type humour is seen in the comedy of many cultures. The English comedy show Whose Line Is It Anyway? has a similar act called "Helping Hands".
