= Tomonori Jinnai =

Japanese actor, tarento and presenter (born 1974)

- 陣内 智則
- Born: February 22, 1974 (age 52); Kakogawa, Hyōgo, Japan
- Other names: Jin (陣); Jin-san (陣さん); Jin-kun (陣くん)
- Education: Kakogawa Municipal Beppu Junior High School; Hyogo Takasago South High School
- Occupations: Comedian, tarento, presenter
- Years active: 1993–present
- Agent: Yoshimoto Creative Agency
- Height: 1.68 m (5 ft 6 in)
- Spouse(s): Norika Fujiwara (m. 2007–2009) Mio Matsumura (m. 2017)

Tomonori Jinnai (陣内 智則, Jinnai Tomonori; born 22 February 1974, in Kakogawa, Hyōgo, Japan) is a Japanese actor, tarento and presenter.

== Filmography ==
=== TV series ===
Regular appearances

Year	Title	Network	Notes
2015	EiEiGo!	NHK E	
2015	Non Stop!	Fuji TV	Biweekly Wednesday regular
2015	Hirunandesu!	NTV	Friday regular
2016	Honne De Japan	BS-TBS	
2016	Chō Hamaru! Bakushō Chara Parade	Fuji TV	MC

Quasi-regular appearances

Title	Network	Notes
Akko ni Omakase	TBS	
Nakai no Mado	NTV	Guest MC
Tsūkai TV: Sukatto Japan	Fuji TV	
Chin Shumoku No. 1 wa Dareda!? Pyramid Derby	TBS	Guest solver

Single-occasional appearances

Year	Title	Network	Notes
2012	Enta no Kamisama	NTV	Irregular appearances
2012	Yoshimoto Kogane Retsuden	YTV	Irregular appearances
	Geinin Documentary: Sagari Agari	Fuji TV	Irregular appearances
	Engei Grand Slam	Fuji TV	

Specials

Year	Title	Network
2004	All-Star Thanksgiving	TBS

=== Former appearances ===
==== Radio ====
Title	Network
Onsuto	Yes-fm
Midnight Yoshimoto Getsuyōbi	FM Danvo
AM808. Majissuyo!	MBS Radio
B Getsuyōbi	MBS Radio
B Friday Special: Jinnai Ken Koba 45 Radio	MBS Radio
Tomonori Jinnai no Hitori Banchoo	TBS Radio
Go Go Monkeys	MBS Radio
Go J!	MBS Radio

==== TV series ====
Regular appearances

Year	Title	Network	Notes
	Fujii Jinnai no The Legend	ABC	
	Bakushō On-air Battle	NHK TV	
1999	Chichin Puipui	MBS	Monday regular
2003	Momotaro Dentetsu	MBS	
2003	All That's Manzai	MBS	Presenter
	Shūkan Purachike!	KTV	Presenter
2004	NaruTomo!	YTV	Presenter
2004	Kaiun Comedy: Kyō mo Daikichi! Panpanpan	ABC	Host
2004	Naniwa Ninjō Comedy: Yokochō e Yōkocho!	ABC	Host
	Kuwangaku	MBS	
	?Majissuka!	MBS	Presenter
	O-sa-mu	MBS	
	Sunge! Best 10	ABC	
	Ōsaka-hatsu Genki Dash! Doyah	NHK BS-2	
	Utawara Hot Hit 10	NTV	
	Hyakuman Bariki	ABC	
2005	Jalker Maxon	MBS	
	The 1 Oku-bu no 8	MBS	Quasi-regular appearances
2006	Tomonori Jinnai no Ikemen 5	ABC	
	Docking 48	KTV	
2007	Ganbaru Hito Ōen Variety: Taiiku no Jikan	TV Asahi	Presenter
2007	Bakushō Mondai no Kensaku-chan	TV Asahi	Quasi-regular appearances
2007	Spo Kaji	TV Asahi	Presenter
2008	Attaka Ninjō Comedy: Yukemuri Paradise!	ABC	Host
2009	Bakushō! Fureai Comedy: Kochira ka Kiku ke Kōenmae	ABC	
	Shinsuke Shachou no Produce Dai Sakusen	TBS	
	M-1 Grand Prix	ABC	Presenter
	Motemote Ninety-nine	TBS	
	Night which is noisy together with Uchimura.	TBS	
	Zenin Seikai Atarimae! Quiz	TBS	
	"Sorette Donna Hito?" Sōsa Variety: G-Men 99	TBS	

Guest appearances

Year	Title	Network	Notes
2003	54th NHK Kōhaku Uta Gassen	NHK TV	
2007	Osaka-hatsu Shissō Stage: West Wind	NHK BS-2	
2007	Junior Chihara no Suberanai Hanashi	Fuji TV 721	
2007	Matsumoto Hitoshi no Suberanai Hanashi	Fuji TV	
2007	58th NHK Kōhaku Uta Gassen	NHK TV	
2007	Shinkon-san Irasshai	ABC	Special guest
2008	Kansai Tokushū	NHK TV	Presenter
2008	Otimo!	KTV	Presenter
2009	Super Morning	TV Asahi	Presenter
2009	Kendo Kobayashi no Suberanai Hanashi	Fuji TV 721	
	London Hearts	TV Asahi	
2010	Geinōjin Kakuzuke Check	ABC	
2010	Futtonda	CTV	
2010	Bakushō Red Carpet	Fuji TV	
2015	Hero	Fuji TV	

==== Dramas ====
Year	Title	Role	Network	Notes
	10 Oku-en no Ryōshū-sho	Tomonori	TBS	
	Karuta Queen	Hiroshi Todo	NHK TV	
2003	Mito Kōmon		TBS	
	Koissuka!? Go! Go!		MBS	
	59-banme no Propose	Seigo Hasegawa	NTV	
2009	Hissatsu Shigoto Hito 2009	Ugly man 1	TV Asahi	Episode 1
2009	Reset	Toshihide Nagasaka	YTV	Episode 8
2010	Natsu no Koi wa Nijiiro ni Kagayaku	Person	Fuji TV	Episode 1
2014	Cinderella Date	Kengo Nishimura	THK	

==== Films ====
Year	Title	Role	Notes
2005	Beat Kids	College student D	
2007	Kamen Rider Den-O: I'm Born!	Sanada Yukimura	
2012	Sora Kara Jessica	Takeshi Miyamoto	Lead role

==== Advertisements ====
Year	Title
	Hudson Soft Momotaro Dentetsu
Namba Walk
ECC Computer Senmon Gakkō
2007	Japan Agricultural Cooperatives Fukui Prefecture Keizairen Fukui US Promotional Campaign
	Tiger Corporation "Donabe Kama Kuro"
2010	Gem Kelly
2012	S & B Foods "Koi Stew"

==== Other ====
Title	Notes
NEC Valuestar	PR video
au	Pamphlet
Toyota	Internet advert

==== Internet series ====
Year	Title	Website
2009	Toriaezu Namachū	Niconico Live
2009	Natsuda! Matsurida! Komentoda! Niconico Douga 12-jikan Buttoushi Namahousou	Niconico Live
2014	Listener by Matsumoto	YouTube

=== DVD ===
Year	Title
2004	Shūkan Tora Tora Tigers Tokubetsu-gō 2004: Vol. 2 2004 Hanshin Tigers Gekitō no Ashiato! –Gekitō! Kanemoto Gekisō! Akahoshi Arigatō Hachiboku–
2005	Men B
2005	Umeda Kagetsu 2 Shūnenkinen DVD: Towa Hozon-ban
2006	Matsumoto Hitoshi no Suberanai Hanashi: The Golden
2007	Jalker Maxon: Dai 1-kai Jalker Photo Academy-shō
2007	NaruTomo! Messenger Kuroda Tomonori Jinnai no Chottoetchina (Hi) Iki mo no Daizukan
2008	Kamen Rider Den-O: I'm Born!
2008	Cinnamoroll
2009	Niketsu!! 2

=== CD ===
Year	Title
2008	Utagassen: Momotaro Dentetsu 20-shūnenkinen Album

=== Voice acting ===
Year	Title	Role
2004	Inuyasha the Movie: Fire on the Mystic Island	Seiten
2005	Black Jack: Futari no Kuroi Isha	Emergency personnel
2007	Cinnamoroll	Chowder, bread dough ghosts, castle ghosts, false chowder, huge chowder

=== Stage ===
Year	Title	Role	Notes
2010	Kiseki no Melody: Hamako Watanabe Monogatari	Nobuyoshi Ueki	
2011	The Winds of God: Ikiru Yūki o Tsutaetai	Kinta Fukuro, Takashi Fukumoto	
2012	Yoshimoto Hyakunen Monogatari: Taishō to Goryōn-san Futari no Yume	Kichibe Yoshimoto	Lead role

=== Live ===
Year	Title
2000	Tomonori Jinnai Vs Hagane Rock
2005	Umeda Premier: Tomonori Jinnai & Bla Mayo Udauda u Shaberimasu
