= Manzai =

Traditional Japanese style of comedy

A pair of manzai performers at a New Year celebration; the tsukkomi at front, the boke behind him (artist unknown, 19th-century Japanese painting)

Manzai (漫才) is a traditional style of comedy in Japanese culture comparable to double act comedy.

Manzai usually involves two performers (manzaishi)—a straight man (tsukkomi) and a funny man (boke)—trading jokes at great speed. Most of the jokes revolve around mutual misunderstandings, double-talk, puns and other verbal gags.

In 1933, Yoshimoto Kogyo, a large entertainment conglomerate based in Osaka, introduced Osaka-style manzai to Tokyo audiences and coined the term "漫才" (one of several ways of writing the word manzai in Japanese);). In recent times, manzai has often been associated with the Osaka region, and manzai comedians often speak in the Kansai dialect during their acts.

== History ==
Originally based around a festival to welcome the New Year, manzai traces its origins back to the Heian period. The two manzai performers came with messages from the kami and this was worked into a standup routine, with one performer showing some sort of opposition to the word of the other. This pattern still exists in the roles of the boke and the tsukkomi.

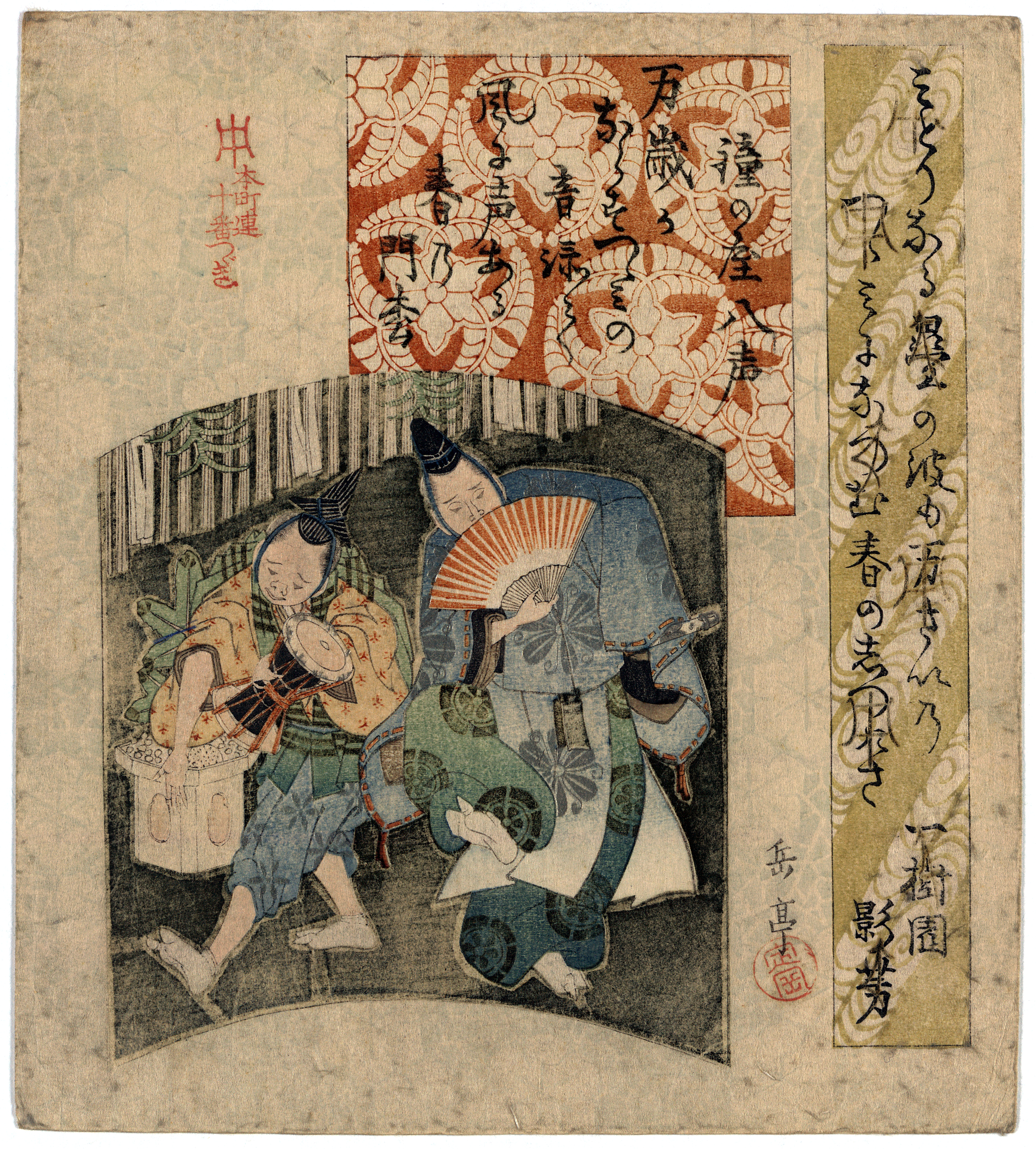
Print depicting two manzai comedic actors, also in a New Year setting; c. 1825

Continuing into the Edo period, the style focused increasingly on the humor aspects of stand-up, and various regions of Japan developed their own unique styles of manzai, such as Owari manzai (尾張万歳), Mikawa manzai (三河万歳), and Yamato manzai (大和万歳). With the arrival of the Meiji period, Osaka manzai (大阪万才) began to implement changes that would see it surpass in popularity the styles of the former period, although at the time rakugo was still considered the more popular form of entertainment.

With the end of the Taishō period, Yoshimoto Kōgyō—which itself was founded at the beginning of the era, in 1912—introduced a new style of manzai lacking much of the celebration that had accompanied it in the past. This new style proved successful and spread all over Japan, including Tokyo. Riding on the waves of new communication technology, manzai quickly spread through the mediums of stage, radio, and eventually, television, and video games.

== Etymology ==
The kanji for manzai have been written in various ways throughout the ages. It was originally written as lit. "ten thousand years" or banzai, meaning something like "long life" (萬歳), using 萬 rather than the alternative form of the character, 万, and the simpler form 才 for 歳 (which also can be used to write a word meaning "talent, ability"). The arrival of Osaka manzai brought another character change, this time changing the first character to 漫.

== Boke and tsukkomi ==
Similar in execution to the concepts of "funny man" and "straight man" in double act comedy (e.g. Abbott and Costello; Martin and Lewis), these roles are a very important characteristic of manzai. Boke (ボケ) comes from the verb bokeru (惚ける/呆ける) which carries the meaning of "senility" or "air headed-ness" and is reflected in the boke's tendency for misinterpretation and forgetfulness. The word tsukkomi (突っ込み) refers to the role the second comedian plays in "butting in" and correcting the boke's errors. In performances it is common for the tsukkomi to berate the boke and hit them on the head with a swift smack; one traditional manzai prop often used for this purpose is a pleated paper fan called a harisen (張り扇). Another traditional manzai prop is a small drum, usually carried (and used) by the boke. A Japanese bamboo and paper umbrella is another common prop. These props are usually used only during non-serious manzai routines as traditional manzai requires there to be no props in terms of routine and in competitions. The use of props would put the comedy act closer to a conte rather than manzai.

The tradition of tsukkomi and boke is often used in other Japanese comedy, although it may not be as obviously portrayed as it usually is in manzai.

== Notable manzai acts ==
=== Winners of M-1 Grand Prix ===
The M-1 Grand Prix is an annual manzai competition planned by Shinsuke Shimada and run by Yoshimoto Kogyo. As of 2024 it is the most prevalent manzai competition in Japan.

=== Asahi Shimbun web survey 2012 ===
The funniest manzai duos, according to a web survey by The Asahi Shimbun in 2012 (excerpt):

- Number 1: Yokoyama Yasushi and Nishikawa Kiyoshi
- 2: All Hanshin-Kyojin
- 3: Yumeji Itoshi and Kimi Koishi
- 4: Bakushō Mondai
- 5: Miyagawa Daisuke and Hanako
- 6: Two Beat: One of them, Takeshi Kitano became a Japanese film director and television host.
- 7: Nakagawake
- 8: Shishi Tenya and Seto Wanya
- 9: Downtown
- 10: Ima Ikuyo and Kuruyo
- 14: Taka and Toshi
- 16: Ninety-nine
- 22: Shinsuke Shimada and Ryusuke Matsumoto
- 26: Summers
- 28: Tunnels
- 29: Yokoyama Entatsu and Hanabishi Achako
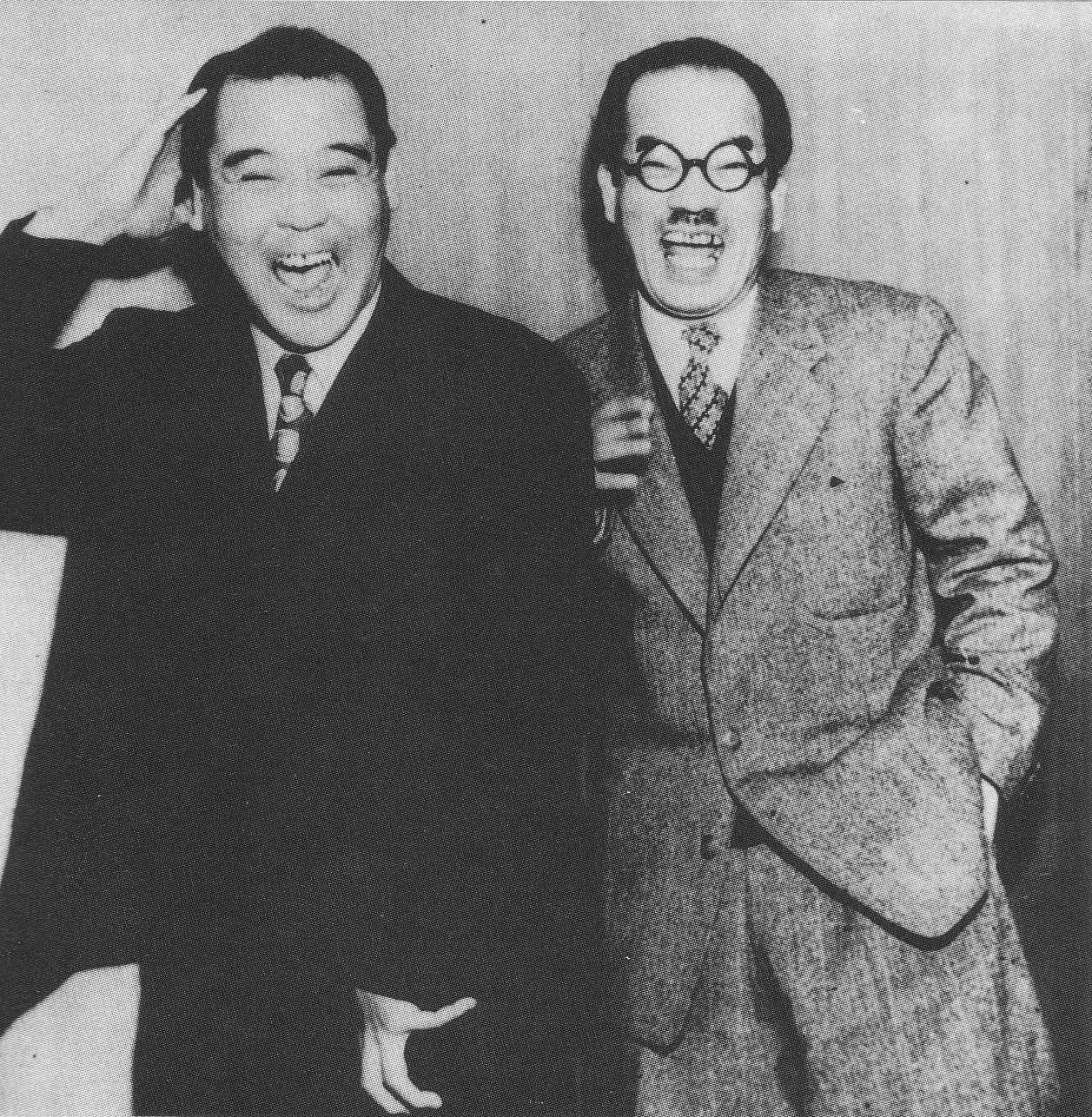
Yokoyama Entatsu and Hanabishi Achako established the talk show-centered manzai style. They were active since 1919.

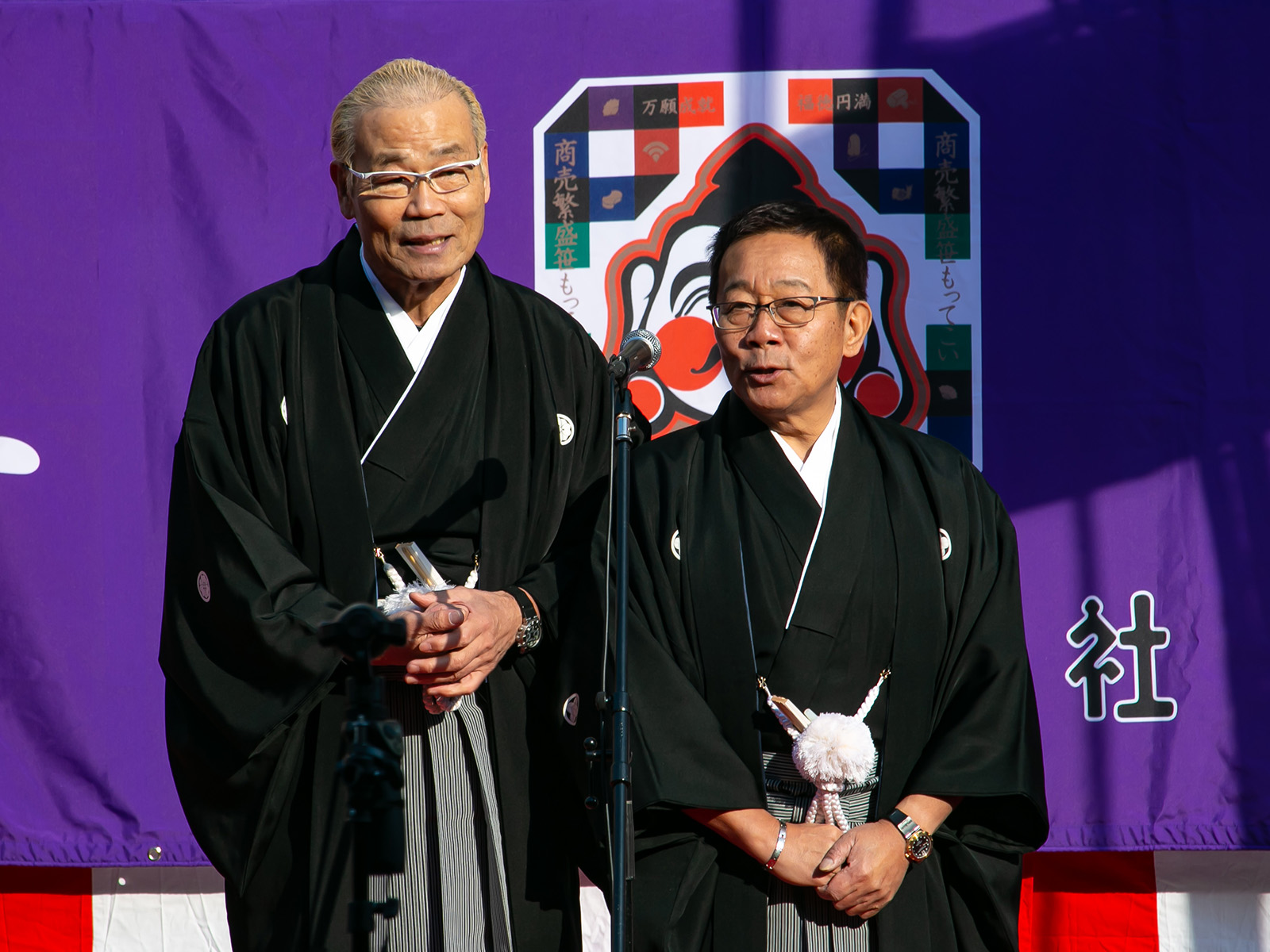
All Hanshin-Kyojin, active since 1975.

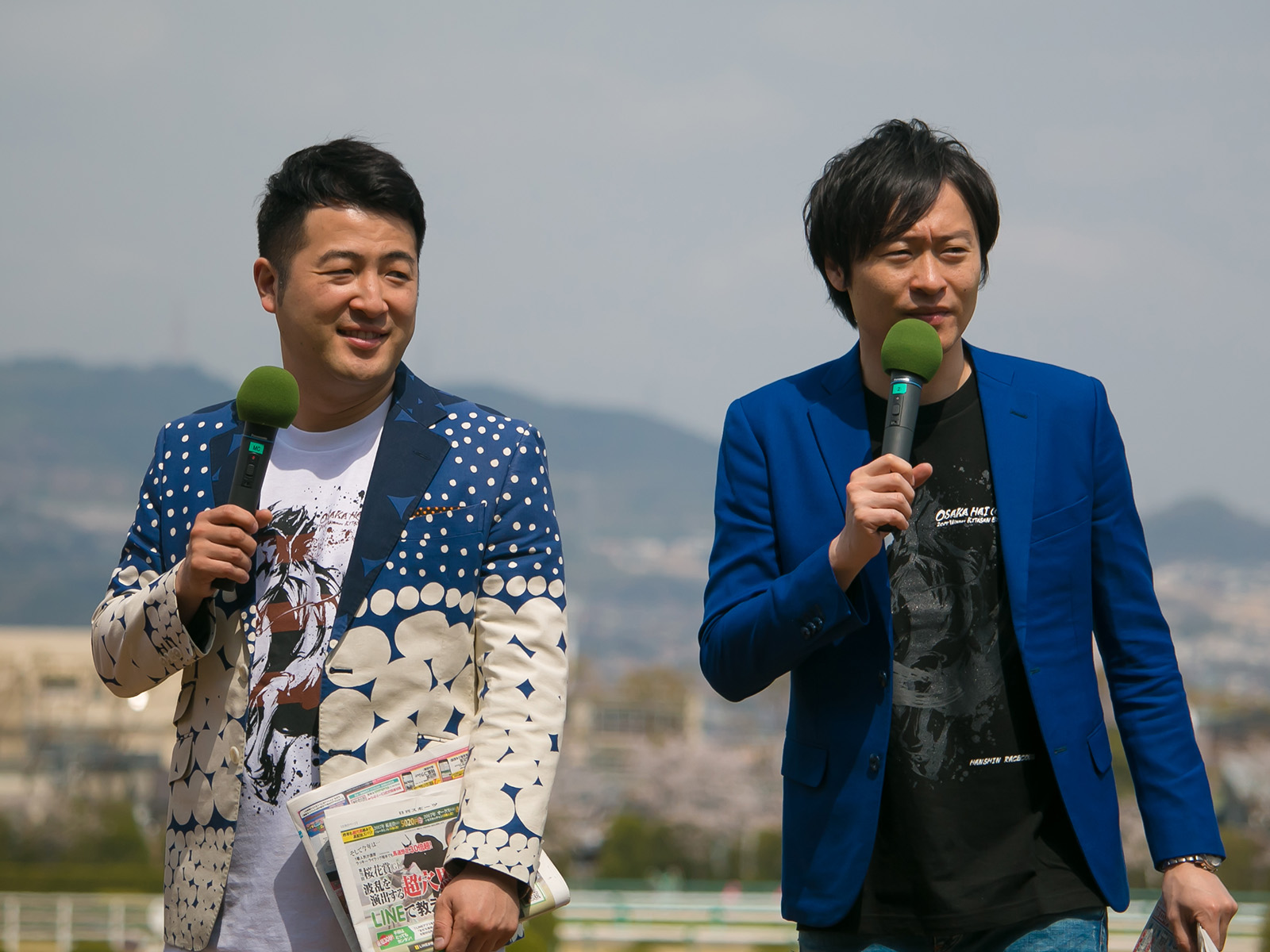
Wagyu, regular finalist in M-1 Grand Prix. Active from 2006 to 2024.

=== Others ===
Gen Takagi is a famous manzai comedian who brought manzai comedy to Finland and even had his own competition.

== Literary associations ==
- Kikaku wrote with affectionate mockery a haiku on the manzai dancers: "The New Year Dancers / Never miss a single gate – / Millet for the crane".
- Buson more positively wrote: "Yes, New Year's dancers – / Pounding good and properly, / The dirt in Kyoto".
- Naoki Matayoshi's novel Spark (火花, Hibana) is set in the world of manzai comedians and deals with the main characters artistic struggles. The novel was awarded the prestigious Akutagawa Prize in 2015.

== See also ==
- The Manzai Comics – manga series about a young manzai duo
- Nininbaori
- Kyōgen
- Rakugo
- Owarai
- Xiangsheng – the Chinese analogue to manzai
