= Glossary of owarai terms =

The following glossary of words and terms (generally of Japanese origin) are related to owarai (Japanese comedy). Many of these terms may be used in areas of Japanese culture beyond comedy, including television and radio, music. Some have been incorporated into normal Japanese speech.

== Glossary ==
=== bangumi ===
番組 (bangumi). The Japanese word for television show or television program.

=== boke ===
ボケ (boke [boke]). From the verb bokeru 惚ける or 呆ける, which carries the meaning of "senility" or "air headed-ness," and is reflected in a performer's tendency for misinterpretation and forgetfulness. The boke is the "simple-minded" member of an owarai kombi ("tsukkomi and boke", or vice versa) that receives most of the verbal and physical abuse from the "smart" tsukkomi because of the boke's misunderstandings and slip-ups. The tsukkomi (突っ込み) refers to the role the second comedian plays in "butting in" and correcting the boke's errors. It is common for tsukkomi to berate boke and hit them on the head with a swift smack; traditionally, tsukkomi often carried a fan as a multi-purpose prop, one of the uses for which was to hit the boke with. Boke and tsukkomi are loosely equivalent to the roles of "funny man" or "comic" (boke) and "straight man" (tsukkomi) in the comedy duos of western culture. Outside of owarai, the term boke is sometimes used in common speech as an insult, similar to "idiot" in English, or baka in Japanese.
Boke also refers to when a comedian or tarento makes a joke or acts like a fool for comedic effect on television. Tsukkomi is also used in variety shows and regular television as a quick one-liner to address the situation or create comedic effects after someone does a boke.

=== conte ===
コント (konto). From the French word conte, konto refers to the style of manzai or owarai performance focusing on telling interesting tales, many of which, one must assume, are made up for the sake of humour. Also often called manzai konto (漫才コント). Short conte (ショートコント) are skits often less than 30 seconds long where the comedians act out some sort of odd encounter or conversation.

A conte usually uses props, backgrounds and settings such as costumes and location as opposed to Manzai. It is possible for any number of people to act in a conte while Manzai is traditionally done with two people, sometimes more than two but never by oneself.

=== corner ===
コーナー (kōnā). Rarely taking the literal English meaning of the word "corner" as in "street corner" or "corner of a shape", this word is usually used in Japanese to mean "segment", as in "television segment".

=== dajare ===
ダジャレ (dajare). A type of Japanese pun or word play in which the similarities in sound of two different words or phrases are used in a joke.

=== dokkiri ===
ドッキリ (dokkiri). Hidden camera shows, pioneered by the 1969 TV show Ganso Dokkiri Camera. Dokkiri geinin (ドッキリ芸人) are comedians that are known for their appearances on various dokkiri programs.

=== gag ===
ギャグ (gyagu). The same as the English word gag, gyagu are generally cheap jokes (though the word often refers to any joke) employed by a geinin in their act. Gyagu tend to be short, physical, and often predictable. American English speakers might say "a corny joke".

=== geinin ===
芸人 (geinin). Gei means "performance" or "accomplishment", and the word geinin is often translated as "artisan". Geinin nowadays refers exclusively to comedians. The un-abbreviated form of the word is 芸能人 (geinōjin), which means "performer" or "entertainer", used to refer to those in the entertainment industry as a whole and usually not for comedians. It can be used in a context similar to the English celebrity. Japanese comedians are called お笑い芸人 (owarai geinin, "comedy performers") or お笑いタレント (owarai tarento, "comedy talents") and talents that appear on television variety shows are usually called 芸能人タレント (geinōjin tarento, "performing talents") or sometimes 若手芸人 (wakate geinin, "young/newcomer talents") for newer additions to the talent pool. A ピン芸人 (pin geinin) is a solo stand-up performer.

=== ippatsu gag ===
一発ギャグ (ippatsu gyagu). Literally means "one-shot gag", it is a term used to represent gags that are usually quick and meant to generate laughter quickly. It can also be called "one-off gags" as they are at many times gimmicky, random and have little context. Ippatsu gags are often used repeated and are often signature gags for certain comedians who rose to fame through that gag, these comedians are often called ippatsuya (一発屋).

=== kire ===
キレ or 切れ (kire). A casual word for "anger" (similar to "pissed" or "ticked"), the キレ役 (kireyaku) is a role sometimes taken by owarai geinin who have very short tempers, or pretend to. Cunning's Takeyama is well known for his short temper; his kire is his defining feature. Also, 逆ギレ (gyaku gire) is the act of getting angry at someone/something in reverse. For example: A girl cheats on her boyfriend, but then gets angry at her boyfriend when he finds out, insisting that it was his fault; a man trips on a rock while walking and swears at the rock, throwing it into the woods. This is a very common role in owarai and manzai performances.

=== konbi ===
コンビ (konbi). An abbreviation of the English word "combination". Usually refers to the "combination" of two Japanese owarai talents to form a comedy unit. The English equivalent is a double act.

=== konto ===
コント (konto). See conte.

=== Lumine ===
ルミネ (rumine). Short for "Lumine the Yoshimoto" (ルミネtheよしもと), ルミネ is a stage (劇場, gekijō) in Shinjuku's LUMINE2 building, exclusively for owarai performances. It has considerable prestige as only the best performers in Japan ever get a chance to appear on this stage in front of a mere 500 live spectators.

=== mandan ===
漫談 (mandan). A form of comedy that consists of a single person telling a comedic story and/or performing comedy to an audience. An equivalent in the west is a one person stand-up comedy.

=== manzai ===
漫才 (manzai). A traditional style of Japanese comedy that consists of two people, or a kombi (comedy duo). The format usually consists of a boke and a tsukkomi.

=== monomane ===
モノマネ or 物真似 (monomane). Usually impressions of other famous Japanese people, monomane is very common in Japan and some talents have even made a career out of their monomane skills. Some geinin famous for their monomane are Korokke, Miracle Hikaru, Hori and Gu-ssan.

=== neta ===
ネタ (neta). Reverse spelling of the word tane (種), meaning "seed" or "pit". A neta is the background pretense of a konto skit, though it is sometimes used to refer to the contents of a segment of an owarai act, a variety show, or a news broadcast. Warai Meshi almost won the 2004 M-1 Grand Prix by doing several acts on a neta about the somewhat poorly built human models in the Asuka Historical Museum in Nara. The neta of variety shows hosted by London Boots Ichigo Nigo almost always have to do with cheating girlfriends and boyfriends. Neta can also be referred to as material, reference, routine, joke or gag depending on the context used. Essentially, a comedian's neta is their content which in most cases are meant to generate laughter. See also shimoneta.

=== ochi ===
オチ (ochi). An ochi is the final part or ending of a neta or story that is supposed to generate laughter. The English equivalent is called the punch line.

=== oogiri ===
大喜利 (oogiri or ōgiri). Oogiri is a form of comedy that focuses on improvisation by providing a funny answer on the spot for a question or thematic topic. Usually presented like a game show or quiz show format, the comedians are asked a simple question, to which they must try to come up with spontaneous witty and funny responses. The question can vary from simple questions to providing a photo of something random, and asking the participants to caption or dub that photo for comedic effects. A notable program that focuses on oogiri is Ippon Grand Prix, where veteran comedians compete against each other.

=== owarai ===
お笑い (owarai). A general term for modern Japanese comedy.

=== pin geinin ===
ピン芸人 (pin geinin). See geinin. A pin geinin is a solo comedian who is not currently in any duos, units or groups.

=== ponkotsu ===
ポンコツ (ponkotsu). Ponkotsu is an adjective that describe a useless and/or unreliable character. An individual could be a ponkotsu character, meaning that they often make mistakes and have embraced this characteristic as a part of their persona.

=== shimoneta ===
下ネタ (shimoneta). Shimoneta is the combination of the characters shimo, meaning "low" or "down", and neta. A shimoneta is a dirty joke, usually focusing on sexual or revolting topics. Some geinin are famous for their shimoneta. For example, Beat Takeshi with his Comaneci gag, where the hands are thrust diagonally like the bottoms of a gymnast's one-piece. Another equally well known comedian is Shimura Ken, who uses the character 'Henna Oji-san' to prowl amidst nubile girls.

=== suberu ===
すべる (suberu). Suberu literally means "to slip", which in comedy refers to when a comedian fails to generate laughter, bombs their act and/or created awkwardness. It essentially means that they have slipped up in their acts. The opposite of suberu is ukeru, which literally means "well received". Comedians try to avoid the act of suberu, but in rare occasions it has turned into a style for some. This is known as suberi-gei (すべり芸), which literally means "the art of slipping", a term used on comedians that often fails to generate laughter or often creates awkward atmospheres with their neta.

=== sur ===
シュール (shūru). From the French word surréalisme, sur (sometimes romanized shule) is comedy with no apparent reason or logic to it. Sur itself is not very common, or popular, though many Japanese comedians are known to try out sur on occasion in their acts. Sur exploits the natural, uncomfortable feeling that occurs when people are confused and do not know how they are supposed to react to a meaningless or unexpected joke or comment, and so they just laugh. Sur may be compared to some of the unusual humor of the late American comedian Andy Kaufman. Strictly sur kombi do exist, but it is extremely hard for sur performers to become popular.

=== tsukkomi ===
突っ込み (tsukkomi). From the verb tsukkomu (突っ込む), meaning something like "butt in", this is often the role of the partner to the boke in an owarai kombi. The tsukkomi is generally the smarter and more reasonable of the unit, and will criticize, verbally and physically abuse, and generally rail at the boke for their mistakes and exaggerations. A typical tsukkomi often slaps the boke on the back of the head, an action always accompanied by an intentionally cheesy slapping sound effect. It is common for tsukkomi in manzai to end an act with the phrase, "Let's quit!" (やめさしてもらいますわ！Yamesashite moraimasu wa!). The term is usually translated as "straight man".

=== ukeru ===
ウケる (ukeru). When something is funny or hilarious, and is a specialized word that originates from 受ける (ukeru), which translates to "well received". In the industry, it refers to when a comedian's act successfully generates laughter and does not bomb or create awkwardness. This is typically an antonym to suberu (すべる).

=== unchiku ===
うんちく or 蘊蓄 (unchiku). Literally a person's "stock of accumulated knowledge", unchiku usually refers to the act of complaining about something while teaching a lesson to an often uninterested audience. Cream Stew is known for unchiku.

=== ureteru ===
売れてる (ureteru). From the verb uru (売る), literally meaning "to sell", ureteru often refers to a performer's ability to sell their act (or themselves), and gives a little insight into the way many Japanese comedians think. An ureteru performer gets many more variety appearances, commercials, and pay from their agency than an uretenai (unable to sell) performer, and many performers determined to succeed will stop at almost nothing to promote themselves and get "selling". It may also refer to how popular a comedian has become (breaking out or making a name for themselves).

=== variety bangumi ===
バラエティ番組 (baraeti bangumi). Though similar to the concept of variety show in English, shows in Japan often venture far from the Western concept. Waratte Iitomo! and Gaki no Tsukai are among the longest running TV variety shows.

== See also ==
- Batsu game
- Nininbaori
