= List of Japanese comedians =

This is a list of Japanese comedians—known in Japanese as owarai geinin (お笑い芸人), owarai tarento (お笑いタレント), or simply geinin (芸人)—and their group names. This page uses the word "comedian" in its broadest possible sense. For more information on modern Japanese comedy, see owarai. Names on this page are listed in English alphabetical order according to family name or group name, where applicable.

For a list of Japanese comedians by their year of debut, see List of Japanese comedians by year of debut.

== !–9 ==
- $10 (テンダラー)
- 130R

- Itsuji Itao (板尾創路)
- Hon Kon (ほんこん)

- 2Chokenju

- Shuji Kawatani (川谷修士)
- Hiroyuki Kohori (小堀裕之)

== A ==
- Abareru-kun (あばれる君)
- Kōji Abe (あべこうじ)
- Aiseki Start (相席スタート)

- Kei Yamazaki (山﨑ケイ)
- Kan Yamaszoe (山添寛)

- Akai Plutonium (赤いプルトニウム)
- Sanma Akashiya (明石家さんま)
- Akina (アキナ)

- Kenta Akiyama (秋山賢太)
- Nobukazu Yamane (山名文和)

- Akira 100% (アキラ100%)
- Alco & Peace (アルコ&ピース)

- Yuki Hirako (平子祐希)
- Kenta Sakai (酒井健太)

- All Hanshin・Kyōjin (オール阪神・巨人)

- All Hanshin (オール阪神)
- All Kyōjin (オール巨人)

- Amakō Inter (尼神インター)

- Nagisa (渚)
- Seiko (誠子)

- Ameagari Kesshitai (雨上がり決死隊)

- Tōru Hotohara (蛍原徹)
- Hiroyuki Miyasako (宮迫博之)

- AMEMIYA
- Anzen Manzai (ANZEN漫才)

- Miyazon (みやぞん)
- Arapon (あらぽん)

- Sayaka Aoki (青木さやか)
- Hiroiki Ariyoshi (有吉弘行)
- Asian (アジアン)

- Miho Sumida (隅田美保)
- Azusa Babazono (馬場園梓)

- Atsugiri Jason (厚切りジェイソン)
- Kiyoshi Atsumi (渥美清)
- Audrey (オードリー)

- Masayasu Wakabayashi (若林正恭)
- Toshiaki Kasuga (春日俊彰)

- Kimimaro Ayanokōji (綾小路きみまろ)

== B ==
- B21 Special (B21スペシャル)

- Hiromi (ヒロミ)
- Mister Chin (ミスターちん)
- David Itō (デビット伊東)

- Bad Boys (バッドボーイズ)

- Masaki Sada (佐田正樹)
- Kiyoto Omizu (大溝清人)

- Bakarhythm (バカリズム)
- Bakusho Mondai (爆笑問題)

- Yuji Tanaka (田中裕二)
- Hikari Ota (太田光)

- Bananaman (バナナマン)

- Osamu Shitara (設楽統)
- Yūki Himura (日村勇紀)

- Beat Takeshi (ビートたけし)
- Bike Kawasaki Bike (バイク川崎バイク)
- Black Mayonnaise (ブラックマヨネーズ)

- Ryūichi Kosugi (小杉竜一)
- Takashi Yoshida (吉田敬)

- Chiemi Blouson (ブルゾンちえみ)

== C ==
- Chidori (千鳥)

- Daigo (大悟)
- Nobu (ノブ)

- Chihara Kyōdai (千原兄弟)

- Chihara Junior (千原ジュニア)
- Chihara Seiji (千原せいじ)

- Chocolate Planet (チョコレートプラネット)

- Shōhei Osada (長田庄平)
- Shun Matsuo (松尾駿)

- Chōshinjuku (超新塾)

- Eagle Mizokami (イーグル溝神)
- Tiger Fukuda (タイガー福田)
- Thank You Yasutomi (サンキュー安富)
- Boo Fujiwara (ブー藤原)
- Koala Koarashi (コアラ小嵐)
- Ike Nwala (アイクぬわら)

- Koriki Choshu (長州小力)
- Cocorico (ココリコ)

- Shōzō Endō (遠藤章造)
- Naoki Tanaka (田中直樹)

- Colocolo Chikichiki Peppers (コロコロチキチキペッパーズ)

- Sōto Nishino (西野創人)
- Nadal (ナダル)

- Conte Aka Shingō (コント赤信号)

- Takayasu Komiya (小宮孝泰)
- Lasa-R Ishii (ラサール石井)
- Masayuki Watanabe (渡辺正行)

- Conte Gojūgo Gō (コント55号)

- Jirō Sakagami (坂上二郎)
- Kinichi Hagimoto (萩本欽一)

- Cowcow

- Yoshi (善し)
- Kenji Tada (多田健二)

- Crazy Cats (クレージーキャッツ)

- Hajime Hana (ハナ肇)
- Kei Tani (谷啓)
- Hitoshi Ueki (植木等)
- Hiroshi Inuzuka (犬塚弘)
- Senri Sakurai (桜井センリ)
- Shin Yasuda (安田伸)

- Cream Stew (くりぃむしちゅー)

- Teppei Arita (有田哲平)
- Shinya Ueda (上田晋也)

- Cunning (カンニング)

- Takanori Takeyama (竹山隆範)
- Tadayuki Nakashima (中島忠幸)

== D ==
- Dachō Club (ダチョウ倶楽部)

- Ryuhei Ueshima (上島竜兵)
- Jimon Terakado (寺門ジモン)
- Katsuhiro Higo (肥後克広)

- Daian (ダイアン)

- Yūsuke Nishizawa (西澤裕介)
- Atsuhiro Tsuda (津田篤宏)

- Tetsurō Degawa (出川哲朗)
- Downtown (ダウンタウン)

- Hitoshi Matsumoto (松本人志)
- Masatoshi Hamada (浜田雅功)

- The Drifters (ザ・ドリフターズ)

- Chōsuke Ikariya (いかりや長介)
- Cha Katō (加藤 茶)
- Boo Takagi (高木ブー)
- Chū Arai (荒井注)
- Kōji Nakamoto (仲本工事)
- Ken Shimura (志村 けん)

- Drunk Dragon (ドランクドラゴン)

- Taku Suzuki (鈴木拓)
- Muga Tsukaji (塚地武雅)

== E ==
- Edo Harumi (エド・はるみ)
- Egashira 2:50 (江頭2:50)
- Kenichi Enomoto (榎本健一)
- EXIT

- Rintaro (りんたろー。)
- Daiki Kanechika (兼近大樹)

- Einstein (アインシュタイン)

- Naoki Inada (稲田直樹)
- Yuzuru Kawai (河井ゆずる)

== F ==
- Football Hour (フットボールアワー)

- Terumoto Gotō (後藤輝基)
- Nozomu Iwao (岩尾望)

- Fruit Punch (フルーツポンチ)

- Kenji Murakami (村上健志)
- Kentaro Watari (亘健太郎)

- Takashi Fujii (藤井隆)
- FUJIWARA

- Takayuki Haranishi (原西孝幸)
- Toshifumi Fujimoto (藤本敏史)

- Ryo Fukawa (ふかわりょう)
- Roppa Furukawa (古川ロッパ)

== G ==
- Ganbareruya (ガンバレルーヤ)

- Yoshiko (よしこ)
- Mahiro (まひる)

- Garage Sale (ガレッジセール)

- Hiroki Kawada (川田広樹)
- Gori (ゴリ)

- Hitori Gekidan (劇団ひとり)
- Ginshari (銀シャリ)

- Kazuhiro Unagi (鰻和弘)
- Nao Hashimoto (橋本直)

- Gokuraku Tombo (極楽とんぼ)

- Kōji Katō (加藤浩次)
- Kei'ichi Yamamoto (山本圭壱)

- Guitar Zamurai (ギター侍) (Yoku Hata (波田陽区))

== H ==
- Kinichi Hagimoto (萩本欽一)
- Hanamaru・Daikichi Hakata (博多華丸・大吉)

- Hanamaru Hakata (博多華丸)
- Daikichi Hakata (博多大吉)

- Hanako (ハナコ)

- Tatsuhiro Kikuta (菊田竜大)
- Hiroki Akiyama (秋山寛貴)
- Dai Okabe (岡部大)

- Hanawa (はなわ)
- Hajime Hana (ハナ肇)
- Hannya (はんにゃ)

- Satoshi Kaneda (金田哲)
- Akiyoshi Kawashima (川島章良)

- Akimasa Haraguchi (原口あきまさ)
- Haraichi (ハライチ)

- Yū Sawabe (澤部佑)
- Yūki Iwao (岩井勇気)

- Harisenbon (ハリセンボン)

- Haruka Chikuwa (箕輪はるか)
- Haruna Kondō (近藤春菜)

- Kikuo Hayashiya (林家喜久扇)
- Sanpei Hayashiya (林家三平)
- Shōzō Hayashiya (9th) (九代目 林家正蔵)
- Heisei Nobushi Kobushi (平成ノブシコブシ)

- Takashi Yoshimura (吉村崇)
- Kenta Tokui (徳井健太)

- Sonomanma Higashi (そのまんま東)
- Kōji Higashino (東野幸治)
- Nora Hirano (平野ノラ)
- Hiroshi (ヒロシ)
- Hiromi (ヒロミ)
- Masami Hisamoto (久本 雅美)
- Hoikenta (ほいけんた)
- Hollywood Zakoshishō (ハリウッドザコシショウ)
- Honjamaka (ホンジャマカ)

- Hidehiko Ishizuka (石塚英彦)
- Toshiaki Megumi (恵俊彰)

- Hori (ホリ)

== I ==
- Igō Shōgi (囲碁将棋)

- Daisuke Fumita (文田大介)
- Taichi Nedate (根建太一)

- Hikaru Ijūin (伊集院光)
- Chosuke Ikariya (いかりや長介)
- Kōji Imada (今田耕司)
- Ayako Imoto (イモトアヤコ)
- Impossible (インポッシブル)

- Eiji (えいじ)
- Hiru-chan (ひるちゃん)

- Impulse (インパルス)

- Toshiyuki Itakura (板倉俊之)
- Atsushi Tsutsumishita (堤下敦)

- Indians (インディアンス)

- Kimu (きむ)
- Akihiro Tabuchi (田渕章裕)

- Inu (いぬ)

- Ryūji Ōta (太田隆司)
- Tōru Arima (有馬徹)

- Asako Ito (いとうあさこ)
- Itsumo Kokokara (いつもここから)

- Kazunari Yamada (山田一成)
- Hidenori Kikuchi (菊地秀規)

== J ==
- Jaru Jaru (ジャルジャル)

- Junpei Gotō (後藤淳平)
- Shūsuke Fukutoku (福徳秀介)

- Jicho Kacho (次長課長)

- Jun'ichi Kōmoto (河本準一)
- Satoshi Inoue (井上聡)

- Tomonori Jinnai (陣内智則)
- Joyman (ジョイマン)

- Shinya Takagi (高木晋哉)
- Kazuyuki Iketani (池谷和志)

- Jungle Pocket (ジャングルポケット)

- Shinji Saitō (斉藤慎二)
- Hirohisa Ōta (太田博久)
- Otake (おたけ)

== K ==
- Kagaya (かが屋)

- Shō Kaga (加賀翔)
- Sōya Kaya (賀屋壮也)

- Kamaitachi (かまいたち)

- Ryuichi Hamaie (濱家隆一)
- Kenji Yamauchi (山内健司)

- Kaminari (カミナリ)

- Manabu Takeuchi (竹内まなぶ)
- Takumi Ishida (石田たくみ)

- Emiko Kaminuma (上沼恵美子)
- Kannazuki (神奈月)
- Eikō Kano (狩野英孝)
- Tsurutaro Kataoka (片岡鶴太郎)
- Kunikazu Katsumata (勝俣州和)
- Katsura Bunshi VI (六代 桂 文枝)
- Miku Kawamura (河邑ミク)
- Yūichi Kimura (木村祐一)
- King Kong (キングコング)

- Akihiro Nishino (西野亮廣)
- Yūta Kajiwara (梶原雄太)

- King of Comedy (キングオブコメディ)

- Ken'ichi Takahashi (高橋健一)
- Hiroki Konno (今野浩喜)

- Kintalo (キンタロー。)
- Kirin (麒麟)

- Akira Kawashima (川島明)
- Hiroshi Tamura (田村裕)

- Knights (ナイツ)

- Nobuyuki Hanawa (塙宣之)
- Nobuyuki Tsuchiya (土屋伸之)

- Kendo Kobayashi (ケンドーコバヤシ)
- Yoshio Kojima (小島よしお)
- Daimaou Kosaka (古坂大魔王)
- Kazuki Kosakai (小堺一機)
- Dayu Koume (小梅太夫)
- Kazutoyo Koyabu (小籔千豊)
- Kūki Kaidan (空気階段)

- Mogura Suzuki (鈴木 もぐら)
- Katamari Mizukawa (水川 かたまり)

- Masashi Kumada (くまだまさし)
- Nobuyoshi Kuwano (桑野信義)
- Kyaīn (キャイ～ン)

- Hiroyuki Amano (天野ひろゆき)
- Udo Suzuki (ウド鈴木)

== L ==
- Lalande (ラランド)

- Sāya (サーヤ)
- Nitsuda (ニシダ)

- London Boots Ichi-gō Ni-gō (ロンドンブーツ1号2号)

- Atsushi Tamura (田村淳)
- Ryō Tamura (田村亮)

- Lotti (ロッチ)

- Sōichi Nakaoka (中岡創一)
- Kentarō Kokado (コカドケンタロウ)

- License (ライセンス)

- Kazuhiro Fujiwara (藤原一裕)
- Takafumi Inomoto (井本貴史)

== M ==
- Ken Maeda (前田健)
- Shinji Maggy (マギー審司)
- Magical Lovely (マヂカルラブリー)

- Crystal Noda (野田クリスタル)
- Murakami (村上)

- Shinji Maki (牧伸二)
- Maple Chogōkin (メイプル超合金)

- Kazlaser (カズレーザー)
- Natsu Andō (安藤なつ)

- Masuda Okada (ますだおかだ)

- Hidehiko Masuda (増田英彦)
- Keisuke Okada (岡田圭右)

- Matazō Mimata (三又又三)
- Matenrō (マテンロウ)

- Anthony (アントニー)
- Ōtoni (大トニー)

- Kunihiro Matsumura (松村邦洋)
- Kenichi Mikawa (美川憲一)
- Miki (ミキ)

- Asei (亜生)
- Kōsei (昴生)

- Milk Boy (ミルクボーイ)

- Takashi Komaba (駒場孝)
- Takashi Utsumi (内海崇)

- Daisuke Miyagawa (宮川大輔)
- Miyashita Kusanagi (宮下草薙)

- Kōki Kusanagi (草薙航基)
- Kenshō Miyashita (宮下兼史鷹)

- Morisanchū (森三中)

- Kazuko Kurosawa (黒沢かずこ)
- Miyuki Ōshima (大島美幸)
- Tomoko Murakami (村上知子)

- Hisaya Morishige (森繁久彌)
- Kenji Moriwaki (森脇健児)
- Shōji Murakami (村上ショージ)

== N ==
- Nagareboshi (流れ星)

- Chūei (ちゅうえい)
- Shinichirō Takiue (瀧上伸一郎)

- Nagon (納言)

- Miyuki Susuki (薄幸)
- Yoshikatsu Abe (安部紀克)

- Nakagawake (中川家)

- Reiji (礼二)
- Tsuyoshi (剛)

- Hideyuki Nakayama (中山秀征)
- Nankai Candies (南海キャンディーズ)

- Ryōta Yamasato (山里亮太)
- Shizuyo Yamazaki (山崎静代)

- Neko Hiroshi (猫ひろし)
- Neptune (ネプチューン)

- Jun Nagura (名倉潤)
- Taizō Harada (原田泰造)
- Ken Horiuchi (堀内健)

- Ninety-Nine (ナインティナイン)

- Takashi Okamura (岡村隆史)
- Hiroyuki Yabe (矢部浩之)

- Kiyoshi Nishikawa (西川きよし)
- Nitche (ニッチェ)

- Keiko Enoue (江上敬子)
- Kumiko Kondō (近藤くみこ)

- NON STYLE (ノン・スタイル)

- Akira Ishida (石田明)
- Yūsuke Inoue (井上裕介)

- Naoko Nozawa (野沢 直子)
- Nyanko Star (にゃんこスター)

- Super Sansuke (スーパー3助)
- Angora Sonchō (アンゴラ村長)

== O ==
- Oasiz (オアシズ)

- Kayoko Okubo (大久保佳代子)
- Yasuko Mitsuura (光浦靖子)

- Obata no Onīsan (おばたのお兄さん)
- Ogi Yahagi (おぎやはぎ)

- Hiroaki Ogi (小木博明)
- Ken Yahagi (矢作兼)

- Ijiri Okada (イジリー岡田)
- Okazu Club (おかずクラブ)

- Ocarina (オカリナ)
- Yui P (ゆいP)

- Bibiru Ōki (ビビる大木)
- Jimmy Ōnishi (ジミー大西)
- Onishi Lion (大西ライオン)
- Oriental Radio (オリエンタルラジオ)

- Atsuhiko Nakata (中田敦彦)
- Shingo Fujimori (藤森慎吾)

- Othello (オセロ)

- Tomoko Nakajima (中島知子)
- Nahomi Matsushima (松嶋尚美)

- Ozwald (オズワルド)

- Yū Hatanaka (畠中悠)
- Shunsuke Itō (伊藤俊介)

== P ==
- Pa-kkun Ma-kkun (パックンマックン)

- Pakkun (パックン)
- Makkun (マックン)

- Panther (パンサー)

- Ryōtaro Kan (菅良太郎)
- Satoshi Mukai (向井慧)
- Takahiro Ogata (尾形貴弘)

- Par Par (パーパー)

- Hoshino Disco (ほしのディスコ)
- Ainapuu (あいなぷぅ)

- Peace (ピース)

- Naoki Matayoshi (又吉直樹)
- Yūji Ayabe (綾部祐二)

- Penalty (ペナルティ)

- Hide (ヒデ)
- Wakki (ワッキー)

- Plus Minus (プラス・マイナス)

- Yoshimasa Iwahashi (岩橋良昌)
- Takashi Kanemitsu (兼光タカシ)

- Punk Boo Boo (パンクブーブー)

- Tetsuo Sato (佐藤哲夫)
- Jun Kurose (黒瀬純)

== R ==
- Rahmens (ラーメンズ)

- Jin Katagiri (片桐仁)
- Kentarō Kobayashi (小林賢太郎)

- Razor Ramon (レイザーラモン)

- Hard Gay (HG, Masaki Sumitani) (レイザーラモンHG (住谷正樹))
- Real Gay (RG, Makoto Izubuchi) (レイザーラモンRG (出渕誠))

- R Fujimoto (R藤本)
- Robert (ロバート)

- Ryūji Akiyama (秋山竜次)
- Hiroshi Yamamoto (山本博)
- Hiroyuki Baba (馬場裕之)

- Rozan (ロザン)

- Hirofumi Suga (菅広文)
- Fuminori Ujihara (宇治原史規)

== S ==
- Frankie Sakai (フランキー堺)
- Masaaki Sakai (堺正章)
- Jirō Sakagami (坂上二郎)
- Dandy Sakano (ダンディ坂野)
- Sandwich Man (サンドウィッチマン)

- Mikio Date (伊達みきお)
- Takeshi Tomizawa (富澤たけし)

- Sanshirō (三四郎)

- Hironobu Komiya (小宮浩信)
- Shūji Aida (相田周二)

- Sanyutei Enraku V (5代目 三遊亭圓楽)
- Sanyutei Enraku VI (6代目 三遊亭円楽)
- Saraba Seishun no Hikari (さらば青春の光)

- Tetsuya Morita (森田哲矢)
- Bukuro Higashi (東ブクロ)

- Savanna (サバンナ)

- Shigeo Takahashi (高橋茂雄)
- Masumi Yagi (八木真澄)

- Tsutomu Sekine (関根勤)
- Shampoo Hat (シャンプーハット)

- Koi-san (恋さん)
- Tetsuji (てつじ)

- Rie Shibata (柴田理恵)
- Shinsuke Shimada (島田紳助)
- Shuhei Shimada (島田秀平)
- Shimofuri Myōjō (霜降り明星)

- Seiya (せいや)
- Soshina (粗品)

- Ken Shimura (志村けん)
- Shinagawa Shōji (品川庄司)

- Hiroshi Shinagawa (品川祐)
- Tomoharu Shōji (庄司智春)

- Tsurube Shōfukutei (笑福亭鶴瓶)
- Atom Shukugawa (夙川アトム)
- Sissonne (シソンヌ)

- Jirō (じろう)
- Shinobu Hasegawa (長谷川忍)

- Speed Wagon (スピードワゴン)

- Jun Itoda (井戸田潤)
- Kazuhiro Ozawa (小沢一敬)

- Sugi-chan (スギちゃん)
- Summers (さまぁ～ず)

- Kazuki Ōtake (大竹一樹)
- Masakazu Mimura (三村マサカズ)

- Sunshine Ikezaki (サンシャイン池崎)
- Super Maradona (スーパーマラドーナ)

- Kazuhiro Tanaka (田中一彦)
- Takechi (武智)

== T ==
- Taka and Toshi (タカアンドトシ)

- Taka (タカ)
- Toshi (トシ)

- Junji Takada (高田純次)
- Tamori (タモリ)
- Kenji Tamura (たむらけんじ)
- Kei Tani (谷啓)
- Masashi Tashiro (田代まさし)
- Tenjiku Nezumi (天竺鼠)

- Katsumi Kawahara (川原克己)
- Yutaka Seshita (瀬下豊)

- Tetsu and Tomo (テツandトモ)
- TIM

- Red Yoshida (レッド吉田)
- Golgo Matsumoto (ゴルゴ松本)

- TKO

- Takehiro Kimoto (木本武宏)
- Takayuki Kinoshita (木下隆行)

- George Tokoro (所ジョージ)
- Tokyo 03 (東京03)

- Satoshi Iizuka (飯塚悟志)
- Akihiro Kakuta (角田晃広)
- Akinaga Toyomoto (豊本明長)

- Tokyo Dynamite (東京ダイナマイト)

- Hachimitsu Jiro (ハチミツ二郎)
- Daisuke Matsuda (松田大輔)

- Tom Brown (トム・ブラウン)

- Hiroki Nunokawa (布川ひろき)
- Michio (みちお)

- Tomochika (友近)
- Tonikaku Akarui Yasumura (とにかく明るい安村)
- Minoru Torihada (鳥肌実)
- Toro Salmon (とろサーモン)

- Kazunobu Kubota (久保田かずのぶ)
- Hideaki Murata (村田秀亮)

- Trendy Angel (トレンディエンジェル)

- Tsukasa Saitō (斎藤司)
- Takashi (たかし)

- Oniyakko Tsubaki (椿鬼奴)
- Teruyuki Tsuchida (土田晃之)
- Hōsei Tsukitei (月亭方正)
- Tunnels (とんねるず)

- Takaaki Ishibashi (石橋貴明)
- Noritake Kinashi (木梨憲武)

- Tutorial (チュートリアル)

- Yoshimi Tokui (徳井義実)
- Mitsunori Fukuda (福田充徳)

- Two Beats (ツービート)

- Beat Kiyoshi (ビートキヨシ)
- Beat Takeshi (ビートたけし)

== U ==
- Hitoshi Ueki (植木等)
- UN-JASH (アンジャッシュ)

- Ken Watabe (渡部建)
- Kazuya Kojima (児嶋一哉)

- Ungirls (アンガールズ)

- Takushi Tanaka (田中卓志)
- Yoshiaki Yamane (山根良顕)

- Universe (ゆにばーす)

- Hara (はら)
- Meijin Kawase (川瀬名人)

- Untouchable (アンタッチャブル)

- Hidetsugu Shibata (柴田英嗣)
- Hironari Yamazaki (山崎弘也)

- Kan Usuki (臼杵寛)
- Ucchan Nanchan (ウッチャンナンチャン)

- Teruyoshi Uchimura (内村光良)
- Kiyotaka Nanbara (南原清隆)

== V ==
- Viking (バイきんぐ)

- Eiji Kotōge (小峠英二)
- Mizuki Nishimura (西村瑞樹)

== W ==
- Wagyū (和牛)

- Shinji Mizuta (水田信二)
- Kenshirō Kawanishi (川西賢志郎)

- Waraimeshi (笑い飯)

- Kōji Nishida (西田幸治)
- Tetsuo (哲夫)

- Wes-P (ウエスP)
- Woman Rush Hour (ウーマンラッシュアワー)

- Daisuke Muramoto (村本大輔)
- Paradise Nakagawa (中川パラダイス)

- Naomi Watanabe (渡辺直美)

== X ==
- X-GUN

- Masahiro Sagawa (さがね正裕)
- Hidetaka Nishio (西尾季隆)

== Y ==
- Tomomitsu Yamaguchi (山口智充)
- Passion Yara (パッション屋良)
- Yasei Bakudan (野性爆弾)

- Cookie (くっきー)
- Rossy (ロッシー)

- Yasuda Dai Circus (安田大サーカス)

- Yasuda Danchō (安田団長)
- Kuro-chan (クロちゃん)
- HIRO

- Yasu-Kiyo (やすきよ)

- Yasushi Yokoyama (横山やすし)
- Kiyoshi Nishikawa (西川きよし)

- Yoiko (よゐこ)

- Masaru Hamaguchi (濱口優)
- Shin'ya Arino (有野晋哉)

- Knock Yokoyama (横山ノック)
- Natsuko Yokosawa (横澤夏子)
- Yonsentōshin (四千頭身)

- Takumi Gotō (後藤拓実)
- Hiroki Tsuzuki (都築拓紀)
- Ryōdai Ishibashi (石橋遼大)

- Yuriyan Retriever (ゆりやんレトリィバァ)

== Z ==
- Zun (ずん)

- Yasu (やす)
- Kazuki Iio (飯尾和樹)

== See also ==
- List of Japanese celebrities
- List of Japanese people
- List of Japanese comedians by year of debut
