= List of Japanese comedians by year of debut =

This is a list of Japanese comedians—known in Japanese as owarai geinin (お笑い芸人), owarai tarento (お笑いタレント), or simply geinin (芸人)—and their group names. This page uses the word "comedian" in its broadest possible sense. For more information on modern Japanese comedy, see owarai. Names on this page are listed by the year of their debut or entrance into the entertainment industry. The list covers only notable comedians. Comedy groups that were formed years after the members debut will not be listed as the members will be listed individually.

For a list of Japanese comedians by alphabetical order, see List of Japanese comedians

== 1951 ==
- Masaaki Sakai (堺正章)

== 1952 ==
- Danshi Tatekawa (立川談志)

== 1954 ==
- Jirō Sakagami (坂上二郎)
- Chōsuke Ikariya (いかりや長介)

== 1962 ==
- Cha Katō (加藤茶)

== 1963 ==
- Kiyoshi Nishikawa (西川きよし)
- Toshio Sakata (坂田利夫)

== 1964 ==
- Kinichi Hagimoto (萩本欽一)
- Pe Hayashiya (林家ペー)

== 1965 ==
- Obon Kobon (おぼん・こぼん)

- Obon (おぼん)
- Kobon (こぼん)

== 1966 ==
- Katsura Bunshi VI (六代 桂文枝)

== 1968 ==
- Pakko Hayashiya (林家パー子)
- Kanpei Hazama (間寛平)

== 1971 ==
- Emiko Kaminuma (上沼恵美子)

== 1972 ==
- Beat Takeshi (ビートたけし)
- Tsurube Shōfukutei (笑福亭鶴瓶)
- Tsurube Shohei (笑福亭笑瓶)
- Ken Shimura (志村けん)
- Daisuke Miyagawa (宮川大助)

== 1973 ==
- Tsurutaro Kataoka (片岡鶴太郎)

== 1974 ==
- Sanma Akashiya (明石家さんま)
- Shinsuke Shimada (島田紳助)
- Tsutomu Sekine (関根勤)
- Hanako Miyagawa (宮川花子)

== 1975 ==
- Tamori (タモリ)
- All Hanshin・Kyōjin (オール阪神・巨人)

- All Hanshin (オール阪神)
- All Kyōjin (オール巨人)

== 1977 ==
- Kazuki Kosakai (小堺一機)
- George Tokoro (所ジョージ)
- Shoji Murakami (村上ショージ)
- LaSalle Ishii (ラサール石井)
- Masayuki Watanabe (渡辺正行)
- Junji Takada (高田純次)
- Lou Oshiba (ルー大柴)

== 1979 ==
- Kimimaro Ayanokōji (綾小路きみまろ)

== 1980 ==
- Tunnels (とんねるず)

- Takaaki Ishibashi (石橋貴明)
- Noritake Kinashi (木梨憲武)

- Corokke (コロッケ)

== 1981 ==
- Masami Hisamoto (久本雅美)

== 1982 ==
- Downtown (ダウンタウン)

- Hitoshi Matsumoto (松本人志)
- Masatoshi Hamada (浜田雅功)

- High Heel (ハイヒール)

- Momoko (モモコ)
- Ringo (リンゴ)

- Hideyuki Nakayama (中山秀征)
- Jimmy Ōnishi (ジミー大西)
- Hoikenta (ほいけんた)

== 1983 ==
- Hidehiko Ishizuka (石塚英彦)
- Naoko Nozawa (野沢直子)

== 1984 ==
- Hikaru Ijūin (伊集院光)
- Kenji Moriwaki (森脇健児)

== 1985 ==
- Kōji Imada (今田耕司)
- Kōji Higashino (東野幸治)
- Itsuji Itao (板尾創路) [Current - 130R]
- Hon Kon (ほんこん) [Current - 130R]
- Dachō Club (ダチョウ倶楽部)

- Ryuhei Ueshima (上島竜兵)
- Jimon Terakado (寺門ジモン)
- Katsuhiro Higo (肥後克広)

- Ucchan Nanchan (ウッチャンナンチャン)

- Teruyoshi Uchimura (内村光良)
- Kiyotaka Nanbara (南原清隆)

- Tetsurō Degawa (出川哲朗)

== 1986 ==
- Yūichi Kimura (木村祐一)
- Lytton Chosadan (リットン調査団)

- Mitsuhiro Fujiwara (藤原光博)
- Tooru Mizuno (水野透)

- Hiromi (ヒロミ)

== 1987 ==
- Toshiaki Megumi (恵俊彰)
- Kunikazu Katsumata (勝俣州和)
- Ijiri Okada (イジリー岡田)
- Kannazuki (神奈月)

== 1988 ==
- Hōsei Tsukitei (月亭方正)
- Tamayo Shimada (島田珠代)
- Hanako Yamada (山田花子)
- Bakusho Mondai (爆笑問題)

- Yuji Tanaka (田中裕二)
- Hikari Ota (太田光)

- Summers (さまぁ～ず)

- Kazuki Ōtake (大竹一樹)
- Masakazu Mimura (三村マサカズ)

- Takahiro Azuma (東貴博)
- Kunihiro Matsumura (松村邦洋)
- Egashira 2:50 (江頭2:50)
- Edo Harumi (エド・はるみ) [Actress debut, comedian debut is 2006]
- Matazō Mimata (三又又三)

== 1989 ==
=== First Gen ===
- Ameagari Kesshitai (雨上がり決死隊)

- Tōru Hotohara (蛍原徹)
- Hiroyuki Miyasako (宮迫博之)

- Gokuraku Tombo (極楽とんぼ)

- Kōji Katō (加藤浩次)
- Kei'ichi Yamamoto (山本圭壱)

- Jun Nagura (名倉潤) [Current - Neptune (ネプチューン)]

=== Second Gen ===
- FUJIWARA

- Takayuki Haranishi (原西孝幸)
- Toshifumi Fujimoto (藤本敏史)

- Chihara Kyōdai (千原兄弟)

- Chihara Junior (千原ジュニア)
- Chihara Seiji (千原せいじ)

- Buffalo Goro (バッファロー吾郎)

- Buffalo Goro A (バッファロー吾郎A)
- Motohiro Takewaka (竹若元博)

- Takeshi Nadagi (なだぎ武)
- Ken Horiuchi (堀内健) [Current - Neptune (ネプチューン)]

== 1990 ==
- Ninety-Nine (ナインティナイン)

- Takashi Okamura (岡村隆史)
- Hiroyuki Yabe (矢部浩之)

- Hanamaru・Daikichi Hakata (博多華丸・大吉)

- Hanamaru Hakata (博多華丸)
- Daikichi Hakata (博多大吉)

- Yoiko (よゐこ)

- Masaru Hamaguchi (濱口優)
- Shinya Arino (有野晋哉)

- TKO

- Takehiro Kimoto (木本武宏)
- Takayuki Kinoshita (木下隆行)

- Daisuke Miyagawa (宮川大輔)
- Hidetoshi Hoshida (星田英利)
- Yasushi Kawabata (川畑泰史)
- Taizō Harada (原田泰造) [Current - Neptune (ネプチューン)]
- Yūki Himura (日村勇紀) [Current - Bananaman (バナナマン)]
- Udo Suzuki (ウド鈴木) [Current - Kyaīn (キャイ～ン)]
- X-GUN

- Masahiro Sagawa (さがね正裕)
- Hidetaka Nishio (西尾季隆)

== 1991 ==
- Cream Stew (くりぃむしちゅー)

- Teppei Arita (有田哲平)
- Shinya Ueda (上田晋也)

- Teruyuki Tsuchida (土田晃之)
- Katsura Sando (桂三度)
- Hiroyuki Amano (天野ひろゆき) [Current - Kyaīn (キャイ～ン)]
- Daimaou Kosaka (古坂大魔王)
- Yasu (やす) [Current - Zun (ずん)]
- Kazuki Iio (飯尾和樹) [Current - Zun (ずん)]

== 1992 ==
- Hiroiki Ariyoshi (有吉弘行)
- Oasiz (オアシズ)

- Kayoko Okubo (大久保佳代子)
- Yasuko Mitsuura (光浦靖子)

- Hitori Gekidan (劇団ひとり)
- Cocorico (ココリコ)

- Shōzō Endō (遠藤章造)
- Naoki Tanaka (田中直樹)

- Kenji Tamura (たむらけんじ)
- Kendo Kobayashi (ケンドーコバヤシ)
- Takashi Fujii (藤井隆)
- Nakagawake (中川家)

- Reiji (礼二)
- Tsuyoshi (剛)

- Hollywood Zakoshishō (ハリウッドザコシショウ)
- Tomonori Jinnai (陣内智則)

== 1993 ==
- Kazutoyo Koyabu (小籔千豊)
- Kazuya Kojima (児嶋一哉) [Current - Unjash (アンジャッシュ)]
- Cowcow

- Yoshi (善し)
- Kenji Tada (多田健二)

- Othello (オセロ)

- Tomoko Nakajima (中島知子)
- Nahomi Matsushima (松嶋尚美)

- Masuda Okada (ますだおかだ)

- Hidehiko Masuda (増田英彦)
- Keisuke Okada (岡田圭右)

== 1994 ==
- London Boots Ichi-gō Ni-gō (ロンドンブーツ1号2号)

- Atsushi Tamura (田村淳)
- Ryō Tamura (田村亮)

- Tomomitsu Yamaguchi (山口智充)
- Osamu Shitara (設楽統) [Current - Bananaman (バナナマン)]
- Penalty (ペナルティ)

- Hide (ヒデ)
- Wakki (ワッキー)

- Ken Watabe (渡部建) [Current - Unjash (アンジャッシュ)]
- TIM

- Red Yoshida (レッド吉田)
- Golgo Matsumoto (ゴルゴ松本)

- America Zarigani (アメリカザリガニ)

- Tetsuya Yanagihara (柳原哲也)
- Yoshiyuki Hirai (平井善之)

- Untouchable (アンタッチャブル)

- Hidetsugu Shibata (柴田英嗣)
- Hironari Yamazaki (山崎弘也)

- Jicho Kacho (次長課長)

- Jun'ichi Kōmoto (河本準一)
- Satoshi Inoue (井上聡)

- Yoshimi Tokui (徳井義実) [Current - Tutorial (チュートリアル)]
- Shampoo Hat (シャンプーハット)

- Koide (こいで)
- Tetsuji (てつじ)

- Ryūichi Kosugi (小杉竜一) [Current - Black Mayonnaise (ブラックマヨネーズ)]
- Takashi Yoshida (吉田敬) [Current - Black Mayonnaise (ブラックマヨネーズ)]
- Yasei Bakudan (野性爆弾)

- Cookie (くっきー)
- Rossy (ロッシー)

- Ryo Fukawa (ふかわりょう)
- Savanna (サバンナ)

- Shigeo Takahashi (高橋茂雄)
- Masumi Yagi (八木真澄)

- Sugi-chan (スギちゃん)
- Koriki Choshu (長州小力)
- Shinji Maggy (マギー審司)
- Satoshi Iizuka (飯塚悟志) [Current - Tokyo 03 (東京03)]

== 1995 ==
- Bakarhythm (バカリズム)
- Ogi Yahagi (おぎやはぎ)

- Hiroaki Ogi (小木博明)
- Ken Yahagi (矢作兼)

- Garage Sale (ガレッジセール)

- Hiroki Kawada (川田広樹)
- Gorie (ゴリ)

- Terumoto Gotō (後藤輝基) [Current - Football Hour (フットボールアワー)]
- Nozomu Iwao (岩尾望) [Current - Football Hour (フットボールアワー)]
- Kentarō Kokado (コカドケンタロウ) [Current - Lotti (ロッチ)]
- Jun Itoda (井戸田潤) [Current - Speed Wagon (スピードワゴン)]
- Kazuhiro Ozawa (小沢一敬) [Current - Speed Wagon (スピードワゴン)]
- Taka and Toshi (タカアンドトシ)

- Taka (タカ)
- Toshi (トシ)

- Shinagawa Shōji (品川庄司)

- Hiroshi Shinagawa (品川祐)
- Tomoharu Shōji (庄司智春)

- Bibiru Ōki (ビビる大木)
- Akinaga Toyomoto (豊本明長) [Current - Tokyo 03 (東京03)]
- Akihiro Kakuta (角田晃広) [Current - Tokyo 03 (東京03)]
- Hiroshi (ヒロシ)
- Tetsuo Sato (佐藤哲夫) [Current - Punk Boo Boo (パンクブーブー)]
- Tokyo Dynamite (東京ダイナマイト)

- Hachimitsu Jiro (ハチミツ二郎)
- Daisuke Matsuda (松田大輔)

- Kōji Nishida (西田幸治) [Current - Waraimeshi (笑い飯)]
- Akimasa Haraguchi (原口あきまさ)
- Yasuda Danchō (安田団長) [Current - Yasuda Dai Circus (安田大サーカス)]

== 1996 ==
- Sayaka Aoki (青木さやか)
- Drunk Dragon (ドランクドラゴン)

- Taku Suzuki (鈴木拓)
- Muga Tsukaji (塚地武雅)

- Shuhei Shimada (島田秀平)
- Rahmens (ラーメンズ)

- Jin Katagiri (片桐仁)
- Kentarō Kobayashi (小林賢太郎)

- Hosei Hachimitsu (月亭八光)
- Dandy Sakano (ダンディ坂野)
- License (ライセンス)

- Kazuhiro Fujiwara (藤原一裕)
- Takafumi Inomoto (井本貴史)

- Viking (バイきんぐ)

- Eiji Kotōge (小峠英二)
- Mizuki Nishimura (西村瑞樹)

- Sōichi Nakaoka (中岡創一) [Current - Lotti (ロッチ)]
- Tetsuo (哲夫) [Current - Waraimeshi (笑い飯)]
- Rozan (ロザン)

- Hirofumi Suga (菅広文)
- Fuminori Ujihara (宇治原史規)

== 1997 ==
- AMEMIYA
- Yuki Hirako (平子祐希) [Current - Alco & Peace (アルコ&ピース)]
- Asako Ito (いとうあさこ)
- Pa-kkun Ma-kkun (パックンマックン)

- Pakkun (パックン)
- Makkun (マックン)

- Hanawa (はなわ)
- Bad Boys (バッドボーイズ)

- Masaki Sada (佐田正樹)
- Kiyoto Omizu (大溝清人)

- Jun Kurose (黒瀬純) [Current - Punk Boo Boo (パンクブーブー)]
- Razor Ramon (レイザーラモン)

- Hard Gay (HG, Masaki Sumitani) (レイザーラモンHG (住谷正樹))
- Real Gay (RG, Makoto Izubuchi) (レイザーラモンRG (出渕誠))

== 1998 ==
- Akira Kawashima (川島明) [Current - Kirin (麒麟)]
- Hiroshi Tamura (田村裕) [Current - Kirin (麒麟)]
- Hiroki Konno (今野浩喜)
- Masashi Kumada (くまだまさし)
- Sandwich Man (サンドウィッチマン)

- Mikio Date (伊達みきお)
- Takeshi Tomizawa (富澤たけし)

- Mitsunori Fukuda (福田充徳) [Current - Tutorial (チュートリアル)]
- Oniyakko Tsubaki (椿鬼奴)
- Tetsu and Tomo (テツandトモ)
- Impulse (インパルス)

- Toshiyuki Itakura (板倉俊之)
- Atsushi Tsutsumishita (堤下敦)

- Robert (ロバート)

- Ryūji Akiyama (秋山竜次)
- Hiroshi Yamamoto (山本博)
- Hiroyuki Baba (馬場裕之)

- Morisanchū (森三中)

- Kazuko Kurosawa (黒沢かずこ)
- Miyuki Ōshima (大島美幸)
- Tomoko Murakami (村上知子)

- Chūei (ちゅうえい) [Current - Nagareboshi (流れ星)]
- Shinichirō Takiue (瀧上伸一郎) [Current - Nagareboshi (流れ星)]

== See also ==
- List of Japanese celebrities
- List of Japanese people
- List of Japanese comedians
