= Kazutoyo Koyabu =

Japanese TV comedian

- 小籔 千豊
- Born: September 11, 1973 (age 53); Sumiyoshi-ku, Osaka, Japan
- Employer: Yoshimoto Kogyo

Comedy career
- Years active: 1993 – present
- Medium: Television; Theatre
- Genres: Owarai, Shinkigeki, mantan, conte
- Musical career
- Instruments: Drums
- Years active: 2017–present
- Member of: Genie High

Notes
- Same year/generation as: Cowcow; Hiroaki Hamamoto (10 Dollars)

Kazutoyo Koyabu (小籔 千豊, Koyabu Kazutoyo; born September 11, 1973 in Sumiyoshi-ku, Osaka) is a Japanese TV comedian, presenter, tarento, and musician, represented by Yoshimoto Kogyo. He was the chairman of the comedy troupe Yoshimoto Shinkigeki from 2006 to 2022 and drummer for the band Genie High.

Koyabu graduated as the 12th generation class from Yoshimoto NSC Osaka and speaks with an Osaka dialect.

== Media ==
=== Television ===
==== Current Programs ====
- Yoshimoto Shinkigeki (よしもと新喜劇) (MBS TV)
- Ima-chan no Jitsu wa (今ちゃんの「実は…」) (ABCTV) – Regular
- Asapara (あさパラ!) (Yomiuri TV) – Semi-regular
- BAZOOKA!!! (BS SKP, 2011–) – MC
- Non Stop! (ノンストップ!) (Fuji TV, 2012–) – Bi-weekly (Tuesdays)
- Koyabu Gachipin Shashin-kan (コヤブガチピン写真館) (Fuji TV ONE, 2013–) – MC
- Chichin Pui Pui (ちちんぷいぷい) (MBS TV) – Semi-regular (Fridays)
- Cream Quiz Miracle 9 (くりぃむクイズ ミラクル9) (TV Asahi) – Irregular
- Keiba Kettō Kenkyūjo (競馬血統研究所) (Fuji TV ONE, 2015–)
- Koyabu Daiseppō ~ Tabi to Gurume no Yonaoshi Seppō Variety ~ (小籔大説法〜旅とグルメの世直し説法バラエティ〜) (Fuji TV ONE, 2017–) – MC
- Koyaburu Sports (コヤぶるSPORTS) (Kansai TV, 2017–) – MC
- Tadaya (無料屋) (TV Asahi, 2019–) – MC
- Yabutsuru ~ Tsurube Koyabu no Ōsaka Yawa ~ (ヤブツル〜鶴瓶・小籔の大阪夜話〜) (NHK, 2015–)
- HINABINGO! (Nippon TV, 2019–) – MC
- Kyōkara Tomodachi ni Naremasuka? (今日から友達になれますか?) (Fuji TV, 2019–) – MC

=== Film ===
- Girl in the Sunny Place (2013), Sugihara
- A Man (2022)
- What If Shogun Ieyasu Tokugawa Was to Become the Prime Minister (2024), Tōru Shimakawa
- The Village of Eight Gravestones (2026), Detective Isokawa

=== Television drama ===
- Rikuoh (2017), Junji Sayama
- Awaiting Kirin (2020–21), Nijō Haruyoshi
- Strobe Edge (2025–26)
