= Ujihara =

Ujihara (written: 氏原 or 宇治原) is a Japanese surname. Notable people with the surname include:

- Fuminori Ujihara (宇治原 史規; born 1976), Japanese comedian
- Ryoji Ujihara (氏原 良二; born 1981), Japanese footballer
- Wataru Ujihara (氏原 亘; born 1977), Japanese musician
