= Panther (owarai) =

- Pansa (パンサー)
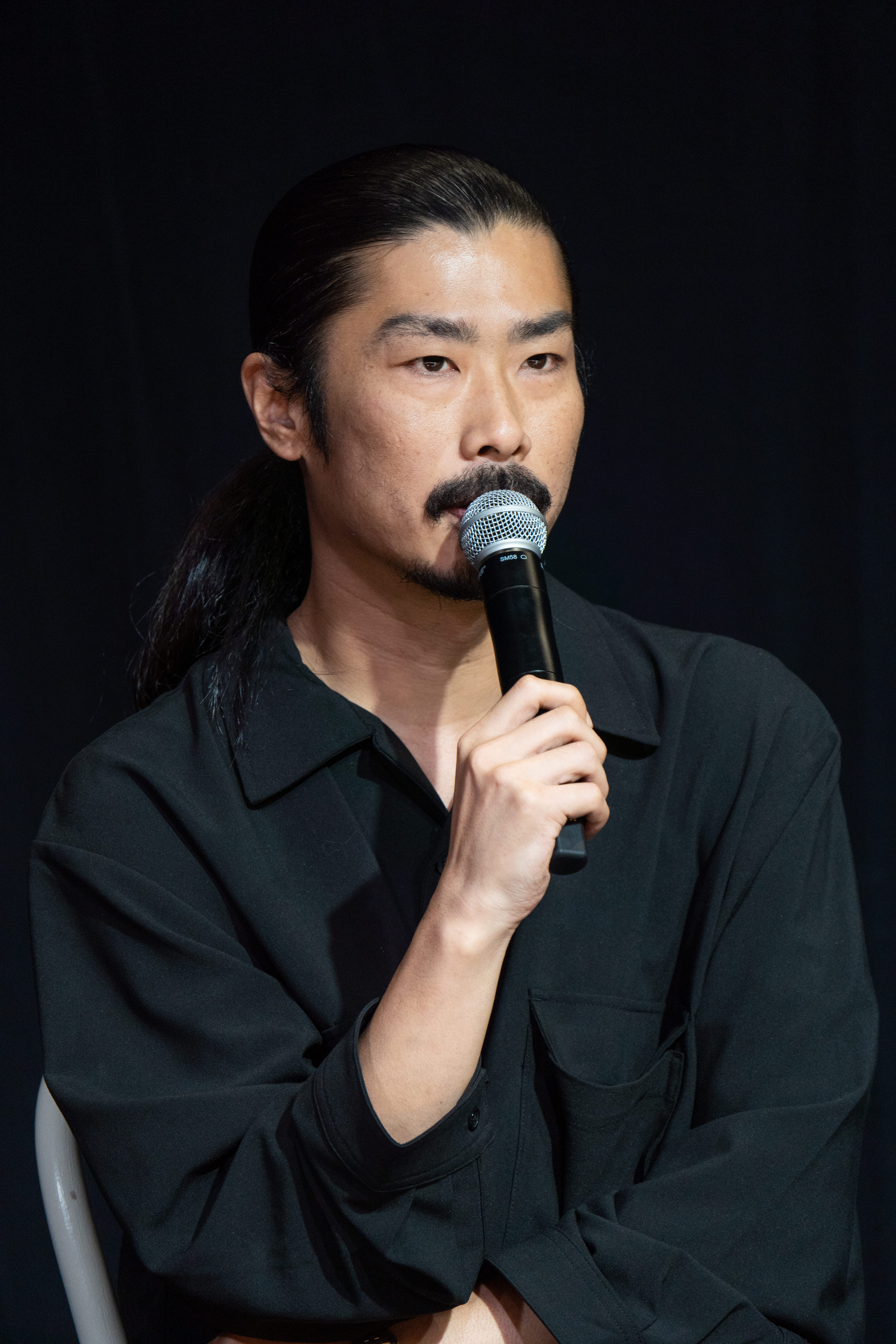
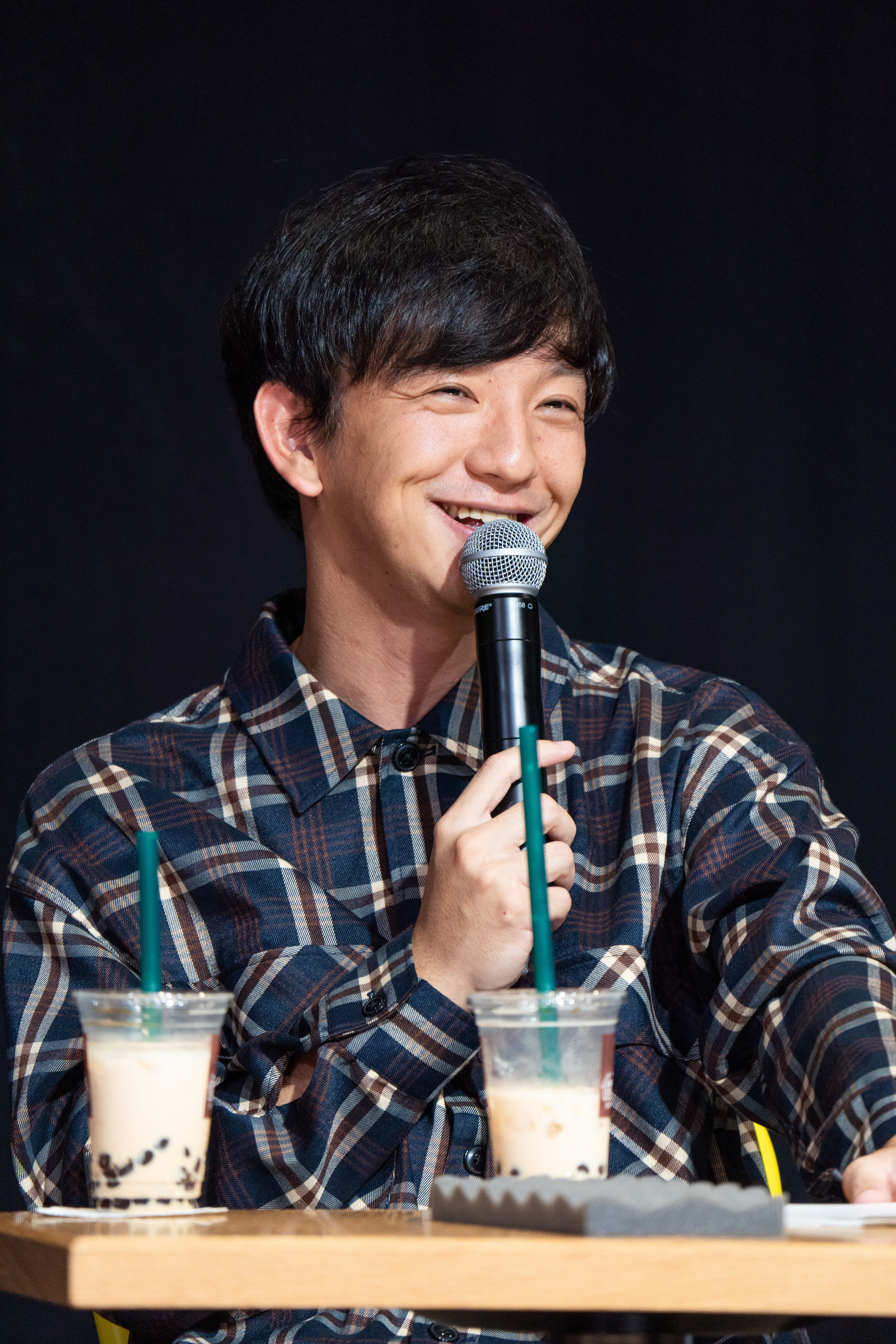
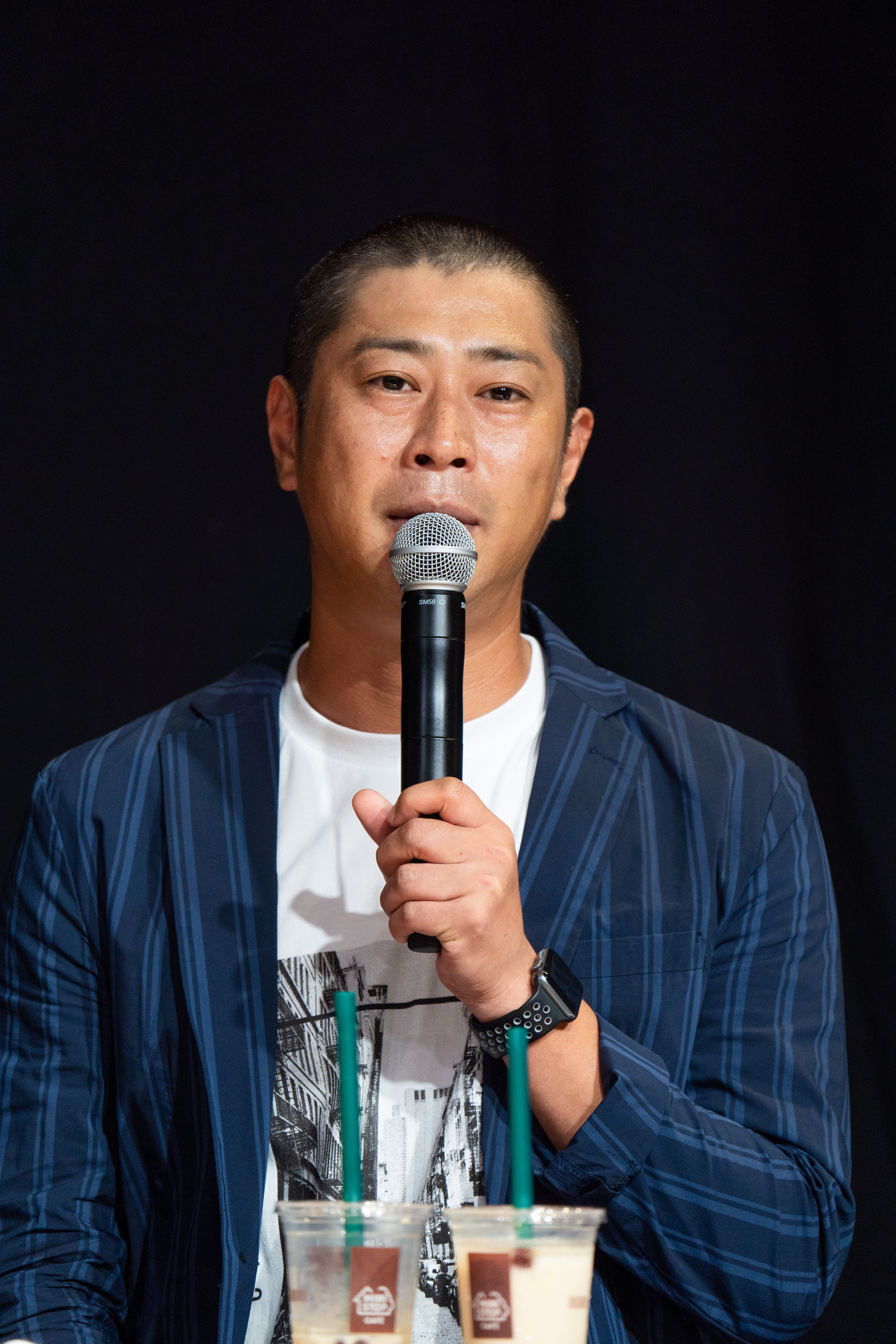
- Ryōtaro Kan Satoshi Mukai Takahiro Ogata
- Employer: Yoshimoto Kōgyō

Comedy career
- Years active: 2008–
- Genre: Conte
- Members: Ryōtaro Kan (Boke); Satoshi Mukai (Tsukkomi); Takahiro Ogata (Boke)

Notes
- Same year/generation as: Slim Club, Joyman (Ogata); Shizzle, Harisenbon (Kan); Edo Harumi, Haraichi (Mukai)

Panther (パンサー, Pansa) is a Japanese comedy trio consisting of Ryōtaro Kan (菅良太郎),Satoshi Mukai (向井慧) and Takahiro Ogata (尾形貴弘) that have featured in a number of Japanese television shows. They are employed by Yoshimoto Kogyo and are mostly active in Tokyo.

== Members ==
- Ryōtaro Kan (菅良太郎) Born April 7, 1982 in Nerima, Tokyo. Plays the boke. He is the main writer of all of the group's material and skits. Kan has been in the industry since 2004.
- Satoshi Mukai (向井慧) Born December 16, 1985 in Atsuta-ku, Nagoya, Aichi. Plays the tsukkomi. Mukai has been in the industry since 2006.
- Takahiro Ogata (尾形貴弘) Born April 27, 1977 in Higashimatsushima, Miyagi. Plays the energetic role, a form of boke. Ogata has been in the industry since 2003.

== History ==
All three members of the group have had previous experience in other comedy units that had dissolved before forming Panther. Additionally, Mukai's former unit was also a trio. Ogata's former partner was Chopper MASA and the comedy duo was called Great Horn. When they dissolved, Ogata went solo as Thank You Ogata, but had no success, almost prompting him to quit the industry and work at a local Ramen Jiro before he met Kan in Shinjuku. Kan's former partner was Shinjiro Hatanaka in the comedy duo High and Low. After dissolving, he was also active as a solo comedian for a short stint. Mukai was in the comedy trio Blue Standard alongside his former partners Yuki Kondo and Ryuji Kohama. Kondo was Mukai's childhood friend and their duo were known as Ajisai Park before forming Blue Standard, even appearing in Speed Wagon's variety show Osorakuteinzu Wagon Takagi Majiru.

In 2008, all three men were solo talents. Kan and Ogata met in Shinjuku and decided to partner up, at the time Mukai also considered partnering up with Kan, and decided to join the group to form the trio. The trio's name Panther was given by Naoki Matayoshi of Peace, the other potential name for the group was Super Cub

Panther are currently active as of 2019 on numerous variety and television programs.

== Media ==
=== Current regular programs ===
- 8Bang! : "Kano ☆ Pan" (8Bang!：「カノ☆パン」) -- Sendai Television (2013-)
- Ariyoshi no Kabe (有吉の壁) -- Nippon TV
- The God of Entertainment (エンタの神様) -- Nippon TV
- Wednesday's Downtown (水曜日のダウンタウン) -- Tokyo Broadcasting System Television
- All Japan Paripi Championships (全日本パリピ選手権) -- AbemaTV (2018-) MC
- Chant! (チャント!) -- CBC TV (2019-) Mukai
- Kano Oga Benrioki (かのおが便利軒) -- Sendai Television (2018-) Ogata
- AbemaPrime—AbemaTV (2017-) Mukai - Friday Regular
- Abema Midnight Keirin (Abemaミッドナイト競輪) -- AbemaTV (2019-) Mukai

=== Commercials ===
- Mattel (2013, 2014)
- Man of Steel (2013)
- Kirin Company (2013)
- Zoff's Disney Collection (2013)
- Eisai (2016) Ogata
