= Rozan (comedy duo) =

Japanese comedy duo

- Rozan (ロザン)
- Other names: Suga-chan and Ujy (菅ちゃん・うーじー)
- Employer: Yoshimoto Kōgyō

Comedy career
- Years active: 1996– (formed in Osaka)
- Members: Fuminori Ujihara (Tsukkomi); Hirofumi Suga (Boke)

Notes
- Same year/generation as: License; Hachimitsu Tsukitei; Dandy Sakano; Hanawa; Drunk Dragon; Koji Abe

Rozan (ロザン) is a Japanese comedy (manzai) duo (kombi) from Osaka consisting of Hirofumi Suga (菅 広文; 10/29/1976-) as boke and Fuminori Ujihara (宇治原 史規; 4/20/1976-) as tsukkomi under the entertainment agency, Yoshimoto Kogyo. Formed in 1996, they are best known for their stand-up acts and TV tarento activities in variety and quiz shows. Ujihara is known as one of the most competitive quiz show contestants.

Having attended highly ranked public universities, the two are broadly recognized as "highly educated comedians". However, Suga eventually dropped out of Osaka Prefecture University while Ujihara graduated from Kyoto University spending 9 years to earn satisfactory credits to graduate.

As the boke, Suga is prone to strange comments, while Ujihara is the more reasonable of the two, often criticizing Suga's remarks. As their talk material, they often use current affairs and items that Japanese students learn in high school and middle school. Suga writes almost all their material while Ujihara types them out since Suga cannot touch-type.

In Yoshimoto Kogyo's annual "Most Handsome Yoshimoto Kogyo Entertainer" awards, Suga won 7th place and Ujihara won 14th in 2009 (8th and 20th in 2008 respectively).

== Biography ==
The comedians first met through basketball club activities when they were students at Osaka Kyoiku University - Tennoji high school. Though never in the same class, they were always together at lunch and commuting time. As Suga wanted to be with Ujihara all through his life, he asked Ujihara to be his manzai partner. Suga also recommended Ujihara to take the entrance exam of Kyoto University, one of the top-tier universities in Japan, for the school name would be a help when they become comedians. Ujihara accepted the offer, and after both of them became university students, they formed Rozan in 1996. While attending university, they went to manzai auditions and failed 12 times in a row. After nearly a year and a half, they finally passed one and made their debut in February 1998 at a manzai live "WaChaCha LIVE Jr.".

== Members ==
Hirofumi Suga (菅 広文, Suga Hirofumi)

- Date of Birth: October 29, 1976 (age 49)
- Birthplace: Takaishi, Osaka
- Manzai Role: Boke

Fuminori Ujihara (宇治原 史規, Ujihara Fuminori)

- Date of Birth: April 20, 1976 (age 50)
- Birthplace: Shijonawate, Osaka
- Manzai Role: Tsukkomi

== Media ==
=== TV ===
Regular

- Quiz! Shinsuke-kun (クイズ!紳助くん)--Asahi Broadcasting Corp. (ABC TV) *Every other Monday
- Chichin-puipui (ちちんぷいぷい) -- Mainichi Broadcasting Sys., Inc. (MBS TV)
  - Every Tuesday, with the segment "Michiannai sho!", using Suga's limited English to guide foreign tourists to their destinations around Osaka Station
- Gokigen Life Style Yo-i-don! (ごきげんライフスタイル よ〜いドン!) -- Kansai TV *Every Friday

Semi Regular

- Asapara! (あさパラ!) -- Yomiuri TV

Irregular

- Ima-chan no "Jitsu-wa..." (今ちゃんの「実は…」) -- ABC TV
- Owarai Wide Show Marco Porori! (お笑いワイドショー マルコポロリ!) -- Kansai TV
- Nambo DE Nambo (ナンボDEなんぼ) -- Kansai TV
- Maki's Magic Restaurant (水野真紀の魔法のレストラン) -- MBS TV
- Bijo Saiban - Renai Saibanin Seido (美女裁判〜恋愛裁判員制度〜) -- ABC TV

=== Radio ===
- GAKU-Shock -- TBS Radio, ABC Radio
