= Shinji Maggy =

Japanese comedian and magician

- マギー 審司
- Born: Shin Miura; November 11, 1973 (age 52); Kesennuma, Miyagi, Japan
- Occupations: Comedian, magician
- Years active: 1994 -
- Agent: Maseki Geinosha
- Height: 1.74 m (5 ft 9 in)
- Spouse: Yuki Yoshida (m. 2006)
- Website: Official profile

Shin Miura (三浦 審, Miura Shin; born November 11, 1973, in Kesennuma, Miyagi, Japan), better known as Shinji Maggy (マギー 審司, Magī Shinji), is a Japanese comedian and magician.

Maggy learned from magician Shiro Maggy. He is the second of three brothers.

== Filmography ==
=== TV series ===
Year	Title	Network	Notes
	Tensai TV-kun	NHK E	
	Bakushō Oneabatoru	NHK G	
	Mecha-Mecha Iketeru!	Fuji TV	
2003	Taikan TV Glamorous	TBC	
2004	Timu Kami-sama no Shukudai	RCC	
2006	3-kagetsu Topic Eikaiwa	NHK E	
	Ta Kajin Mune-ippai	KTV	
	Aoi Sora ga Suki tsu!	YAB	
	Shōten	NTV	
2007	Jōhō Live Movin'	Sendai	
2008	Mezamashi TV Kōnin Wagamama! Kimama! Tabi Kibun	Sendai, BS Fuji	
2008	Sendai Television Matsuri	Sendai	
	Kasou Taishou	NTV	
2011	Suiensaa	NHK E	Guest
	Tōhoku Tamashī TV	BS Fuji	
2012	Bakushō Red Carpet	Fuji TV	
2014	Shinobu Sakagami no Seichō Man!!	TV Asahi	Guest
2015	Nobinobi City Saitama-shi	TV Saitama	Reporter

==== Miniseries ====
Title	Network	Notes
Shinji Maggy no Smile Magic	Kids Station	

=== Advertisements ===
Title	Notes
Lion	
JR East	
Aquaplus	
Shinmotsu no Daishin	

=== Websites ===
Year	Title	Notes
2014	Shinji Maggy no Chūnichi Shinbun	

=== Radio series ===
Title	Network	Notes
Nisshin Shokuhin Emi Up Station Shinji Maggy no Mimi Yori Radio	YBC	

=== Films ===
Year	Title	Notes
2006	Crusher Kazuyoshi	

=== Music videos ===
Title	Notes
FripSide "Only my railgun"	

=== Live ===
Title	Notes
Animelo Summer Live 2010: Evolution	co-starring with FripSide
