= Junji Takada =

Japanese actor and comedian (born 1947)

- 高田 純次
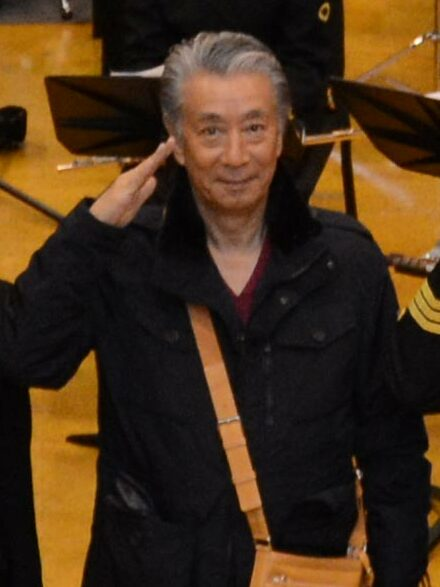
- 2019
- Born: 21 January 1947 (age 79); Chōfu, Tokyo, Japan
- Occupations: Actor and comedian
- Years active: 1977–present
- Agent(s): Take One Office Co., Ltd
- Height: 1.75 m (5 ft 9 in)

Junji Takada (高田純次, Takada Junji; born January 21, 1947), also known by the nicknames "Jun chan" (純ちゃん), "Uncle Jun" (純じい, Jun jī) and "TJ", is a Japanese actor and comedian.

Takada was born in Chōfu, Tokyo. He is known for the variety show Tensai, Takeshi no Genki ga Deru Terebi that was hosted by Takeshi Kitano and premiered on NTV from 1985 to 1996. On April 9, 2017, Takada began co-hosting a radio program with manga artist Naoki Urasawa. Junji and Naoki (純次と直樹) airs Sundays at 5pm on Nippon Cultural Broadcasting and features both men talking about their lives, professions, and favorite hobbies.

== Filmography ==
=== Film ===
- Mr.Jiren Man Shikijō Kurui (1979)
- Scrap Story: Aru Ai no Monogatari (1984)
- Leave My Girl Alone (1986)
- Moonlight Serenade (1997)
- Karaoke: Jinsei Kami Hitoe (2005) as Nikichi Endō
- Kisarazu Cats Eye World Series (2006) Mayor Kandori
- Pavilion Sanshōuo (2006) as Shirō Ninomiya
- Piano no Mori (2007)
- Clearness (2008)
- Flying☆Rabitts (2008) as Director Hayashi
- Homecoming (2011) as Kazuaki Tokita
- Stigmatized Properties (2020)

=== Television ===
- Minami-kun no Koibito (1994)
- Wagaya no Rekishi (2010)
- Kyotaro Nishimura Travel Mystery (2012–present) as Detective Kamei
- Soda Master (2026) as Rokuro Kagami

=== Dubbing ===
- Ice Age: The Meltdown, Fast Tony
