= Naoko Nozawa =

Japanese comedian (born 1963)

- 野沢 直子
- Born: 29 March 1963 (age 62); Tokyo, Japan
- Other names: Naoko Auclair (American name)
- Education: Tokyo Agricultural University Daiichi High School
- Occupations: Comedian, Musician
- Years active: 1983–
- Agent: Yoshimoto Kogyo
- Television: Yume de Aetara; Waratte Iitomo!; Quiz Sekai wa Show by!!
- Height: 158 cm (5 ft 2 in)
- Spouse: Robert Auclair (1992-2025) Tora Fujimoto (2025-Present)
- Website: https://profile.yoshimoto.co.jp/talent/detail?id=720

Naoko Nozawa (野沢 直子, Nozawa Naoko) born 29 March 1963, in Tokyo, is a Japanese comedian and musician. Her married name (and as a permanent resident, her legal name in the United States) is Naoko Auclair (ナオコ・オークライヤー, Naoko Ōkuraiyā).

Nozawa is represented with Yoshimoto Creative Agency. Her grandfather was author Naojiro Kuga, her uncle was voice actor and theatre director Nachi Nozawa, and her cousin is actor So Nozawa.

After relocating to the United States in 1991, Nozawa occasionally returns to Japan on a yearly basis to appear in Japanese media, in order to remain contracted with the Yoshimoto Kogyo agency. As such, Nozawa has taken part of special units (such as the comedian-based idol group Yoshimotozaka46) and appeared on television shows (Waratte Iitomo! and Bokura no Jidai). Nozawa refers to herself as a "migrant comedian".

== Musical career ==
In 1991, Nozawa took a break from the Japanese entertainment scene and moved to New York. In 1992, she announced that she was in a rock band called The Ass Baboons of Venus. After her marriage to her bandmate (see Personal Life), The Ass Baboons of Venus later suspended their activities to focus on their family.

In 2015, Nozawa formed a new band called Electric Machine Gun Tits (EMGT). The band performs regularly in nightclubs and venues throughout the San Francisco Bay Area. Electric Machine Gun Tits opened for Guitar Wolf, Lolita No.18, and PUFFY during their American tours.

== Personal life ==
In 1992, Nozawa married her Ass Baboons bandmate, Robert "Bob Limp" Auclair. Nozawa and Auclair later relocated to San Francisco to raise their children: one son and two daughters. Bob Auclair later took on a career as a nurse and the couple had suspended their band. Their eldest daughter is mixed martial arts fighter Shinju "Juju" Nozawa-Auclair.

In January 2024, Nozawa had announced that the couple had begun divorce proceedings. Later that year, Nozawa simultaneously announced that she is dating her EMGT bandmate Tora Fujimoto, who is 13 years Nozawa's junior, and that the couple plans to marry upon finalization of her divorce from Auclair.

On July 18, 2025, during an appearance on Tokyo MX's "5-ji ni Muchū", Nozawa announced that her divorce had been finalized and as planned, she had already married Fujimoto. Nozawa and Fujimoto have since uploaded various Instagram posts announcing themselves as a married couple.

== Program appearances ==
=== Former appearances ===
Year	Title	Network
	Hyōkin Yobikō	Fuji TV
	Jōdangahō	Fuji TV
	Yūyake Nyan Nyan	Fuji TV
1984	Kibun wa Meitantei	NTV
1985	Party Yarō ze!	TV Asahi
1985	Osawagase Kenshi: Suzunosuke Akado	Fuji TV
1986	Checkers in Namida no Request	Fuji TV
1987	Waratte Iitomo!	Fuji TV
1988	Quiz Sekai wa Show by!!	NTV
1989	Yume de Aetara	Fuji TV
1989	Sekai no Chō Gōka Chinpin Ryōri	Fuji TV
	Quiz kore wa Uma i!	TBS
	Kayō Dokkiri Daihōsō	TV Asahi
	Odekake Komachi-gumi	MBS
1990	Beat Takeshi no Owarai Ultra Quiz	NTV
	Hana no Joshi-kō: Sei Cattleya Gakuen	TV Tokyo
	Raion no gokigen yō	Fuji TV
2016	Shikujiri-sensei: Ore mitai ni naru na!!	TV Asahi

=== Kansai local ===
Title	Network
MBS Young Town	MBS Radio

=== Chūkyō local ===
Year	Title	Network
1987	5-Ji Sat Magazine	CTV
2016	Honnō Z	CBC

== Discography ==
Title	Notes
Hanaji	Recorded "Ōwada baku", "Michael Tomioka no Yoru wa Fukete", "Tomoko to Yobanaide", and "Alps no Shōjo Heidi"
Fukazume	
Tonyoshi Chinpei Kanta	Recorded cover of Linda Yamamoto's song "Komacchauna"
Seiri de Pon!	
Naoko Nozawa Super Best	

== Filmography ==
Year	Title
	Money zansu'!
Tokyo zansu' "Tokyo Escalator"
Hayashiya Parko no Yabō
Teito Monogatari
Ashita Ga Arusa
2006	The Vagina Monologues
	Monkfish Dream
The Legend of the Water Breakers

== Bibliography ==
Year	Title
2010	Applique
