= Savanna (comedy duo) =

Japanese comedy duo

- Sabanna (サバンナ)
- Employer: Yoshimoto Kogyo

Comedy career
- Years active: 1993–
- Members: Masumi Yagi (Tsukkomi); Shigeo Takahashi (Boke)

Savanna (サバンナ) are a Japanese comedy duo consisting of Masumi Yagi (八木 真澄) and Shigeo Takahashi (高橋 茂雄). Both attended Ritsumeikan University High School and created the manzai team as a joke during their years at Ritsumeikan University, having first met in the school's judo club. They then decided to join Yoshimoto Kogyo as a professional kombi. Their act is heavily based on observational humor, and Yagi frequently being confused as the boke of the group.

Born on August 4, 1974, in Ide, Kyoto near Uji, Kyoto, Yagi originally had decided to become a tax official (though he had previously received a black belt in judo) when he met Takahashi and became a manzai comedian. Officially, he is the tsukkomi of the two, and he usually plays the "normal guy" in their observational humor acts. He is known for his meaningless English gags (not unlike Kazuki Ōtake of the kombi Summers), and often yells phrases such as "Spoon!", "Fork!", "I like protein! I am hercules!", "Handshake survival!", and "Tsuppari Ichiban! Chiyotaikai!", the last one referring to the favored arm-thrusting attack style of sumo ozeki (champion) Chiyotaikai Ryūji.

The boke of the group, Takahashi, was born January 28, 1976, in Kyoto. He generally plays the stranger role in their acts, and his blues-playing character, Hiroshi Inui, has become a frequent addition to their material lately, allowing the duo to advance to the semi-finals during the 2006 R-1 Grand Prix tournament. His father is a respected dentist.

While Savanna has performed over 100 observational humor acts (neta) on stage, it is rumored that Yagi has created a usable stock of over 500.

Yagi has appeared on Ninja Warrior before, failing to complete the first stage after whipping out on the 'Jumping Spider' challenge.
