= Sendai Kamotsu =

Japanese rock band

- Origin: Sendai, Japan
- Genre: Comedy rock
- Years active: 2001–present
- Members: Chiba; Satty; Fullface; Wen Chen Chen; Gigaflare; Kurihara
- Website: www.sendaikamotsu.net

Sendai Kamotsu (Japanese: 仙台貨物; "Sendai Transport") is a Japanese rock band, formed in September 2001 as the comedic side project of the visual kei band Nightmare. It consists of entirely the same members using aliases (although neither band admits this), with the addition of a programmer. Sendai Kamotsu consists of Chiba (lead vocals), Satty (guitar), Fullface (guitar), Wen Chen Chen (bass), Gigaflare (drums) and Kurihara (programming).

== History ==
=== 2001–2010 ===
Sendai Kamotsu formed in 2001 before Nightmare became successful, beginning their activities in 2002. They took part in the first Cannonball omnibus and toured with Doremidan and Shulla. They were first featured in Nightmare's "Jishou -Shounen Terrorist-" PV, minus Chiba.

Their first two demo tapes, "Kimuchi" and "Saipan" were released in April and July 2002, respectively. Their first album, Okuru Kotoba came out in April 2004. After that was a yearly single and an album release, starting with "N.M.N-No More Nayamimuyo-" in February 2006, "Kamisama Mou Sukoshi Dake" and their popular album, Jinsei Game in July 2006, "Gei School Otokogumi" in October 2007 and "Umanamide" in October 2008. "Umanamide" was used as the theme song to the anime Zettai Yareru Girisha Shinwa, which also featured Chiba as a voice actor.

During a surprise concert on September 5, 2009, Sendai Kamotsu announced that the band would be going on a break due to the company going bankrupt in the economic recession. The story of their bankruptcy was played out in the music video for "Fukyou no Kaze". They released their third album, Deko on October 28, 2009. It reached #15 in the Oricon Charts. The band had their final shows at the end of October in Sendai and at the Nippon Budokan on November 5, 2009, titled "Fukyou no Kaze~Sendai Kamotsu ~Forever~."

During the band's hiatus, vocalist Chiba began a solo career under the name "Igaguri Chiba" (イガグリ千葉). Kurihara joined him again as sound manipulator. His first solo single, "Gira Gira Boys" (ギラギラボーイズ; "Glitter Boys") was released on October 6, 2010. He embarked on a short solo tour in three live houses: Diamond Hall, Osaka Big Cat, and Shibuya O-East. The short tour was called On the Road Until Sendai Kamotsu's Revival (仙台貨物 復活までの道のり). Sendai Kamotsu's last Budokan live DVD and CD was released October 6, 2010, alongside "Gira Gira Boys."

=== Revival (2011–present) ===
The revival of Sendai Kamotsu was announced on their homepage in May 2011. Chiba stated the reason for their revival was because Japan was in crisis and needed a hero. The sextet returned with their four date tour "Hero ~The Comforting Express Home Delivery Service, Returned~" (「HERO」~帰ってきた癒しの宅配便~) tour in July, as well as releasing two new songs via Dwango for download; "Hero ~Return of the Red Justice~" and "Okuru Kotoba 2." They begin another tour on December 23, 2012, titled "Sendai Kamotsu! All Set?!" (仙台貨物だョ！全員集合!?).

Since the revival, Chiba has been going under his solo name Igaguri Chiba and has released a mini album titled Chiba no Ana Vol.1 (千葉の穴 vol.1). He was also a special musical guest at FanimeCon on May 26, 2012. This was his U.S. debut performance. Upon returning from the U.S., Chiba had embarked on a short tour titled "Bitch Boys ~Forever Your Love~." Sendai Kamotsu participated in Kishidan Banpaku 2012, a rock n' roll Olympic hosted by the band Kishidan.

In April 2013, Sendai Kamorsu left their previous record label, Universal J, and joined Avex Entertainment after Chiba begged his big brother Yomi for a contact. Even though they are officially under Avex, their official label is called "G-nation!". Two best of albums, Suke Best 1 & 2, were released on July 10. The album Chiba no Mikusu (チバノミクス) was then released on December 18. On July 30, 2014, the band released the album Sendie Kamotsu and embarked on a nationwide tour that ended at the end of August with two shows at Shibuya Public Hall.

== Image ==
Sendai Kamotsu style themselves as a delivery company, with a uniform of red boilersuits. The members of the band call themselves "Employees". They even cited "company bankruptcy" as the reason for their hiatus in 2009. The band's rallying cry is that they love "Gay People" and fans have been known to shout "one more gay" to begin encores at live performances. Chiba is the younger brother of Nightmare's vocalist, Yomi.

== Members ==
The members of Sendai Kamotsu and their Nightmare counterparts are:

- Vocals: Chiba (千葉) - YOMI from Nightmare
- Guitar: Fullface (フルフェイス) - Hitsugi from Nightmare
- Guitar: Satty (サティ) - Sakito from Nightmare
- Bass: Wen Chen Chen (王珍々) - Ni~ya from Nightmare
- Drums: Gigaflare (ギガフレア) - Ruka from Nightmare
- Programming: Kurihara

== Discography ==
Sendai Kamotsu discography
- Studio albums: 5
- Live albums: 1
- Compilation albums: 2
- Singles: 3
- Video albums: 9

=== Studio albums ===
Release date	Album details	Oricon Peak
2004.04.01	Okuru Kotoba (送る言葉)	87
2006.07.12	Jinsei Geimu (人生ゲイム)	30
2009.10.28	Deko (凸 ～デコ～)	15
2013.12.18	Chiba no Mikusu (チバノミクス)	37
2014.07.30	Sendie Kamotsu	24

=== Singles ===
Release date	Single Details	Oricon Peak
2005.02.26	N.M.N ~No More Nayamimuyou~	—
2006.07.19	Kamisama Mou Sukoshi Dake (神様もう少しだけ)	37
2007.10.10	Gei School Otokogumi!! / Over The Gaynbow (芸スクール漢組! / オーバーザゲインボー)	5
2008.10.15	Uma Nami de / Zekkomon (うまなみで。 / 絶交門)	9

=== Compilation albums ===
- Suke Best 1 (スケベスト1) - Released: 2013.07.10 (Oricon: #17)
- Suke Best 2 (スケベスト2) - Released: 2013.07.10 (Oricon: #18)

=== Live albums ===
- Tour 2009 Fukyou no Kaze ~Sendai Kamotsu Forever~ (トゥアー2009 腐況の風～仙台貨物FOREVER～) - Released: 2010.10.06 (Oricon: #152)

=== Demo tapes ===
- Saipan (サイパン) - Released: 2002.04.27
- Kimchee (キムチ) - Released: 2005.07.21

=== Video albums ===
Release date	DVD Details	Oricon Peak
2005.02.23	Gay no Karasawagi Live at O-west (芸(ゲイ)のから騒ぎ Live at O-west)	99
2005.10.05	Gaylimpic Ebisu 2005	59
2007.08.08	Tour Jinsei Game (トゥアー人生ゲイム)	33
2008.11.05	Tour 2007 Kyoshi Gingin Monogatari @ Hibiya Yagai Dai Ongakudou (トゥアー2007教師ぎんぎん物語@日比谷野外大音楽堂)	25
2009.09.09	Live & Film Tour 2008 (umanamide) (ライブ＆フィルムトゥアー ２００８「うまなみで。」)	14
2009.10.28	Zetsu Koumon (絶黄門)	35
2010.10.06	Tour 2009 Fukyou no Kaze~Sendai Kamotsu Forever~ (トゥアー2009 腐況の風～仙台貨物FOREVER～)	27
2012.12.19	Sendai Kamotsu Tour 2011 (HERO)~Kaette Kita Iyashi no Takuhaibin~ (仙台貨物トゥアー２０１１「ＨＥＲＯ」～帰ってきた癒しの宅配便～)	73
2012.12.19	Sendai Kamotsu Best Tour 2013 "Sukebest!" Final @Kokuritsu Yoyogi Kyogijo Daini Taiikukan (Sendai Kamotsu Best tour 2013「スケベスト!」FINAL @国立代々木競技場第二体育館)	35

== See also ==
- Nightmare
