= 10 Dollars =

Japanese comedy duo

$10 (テンダラー, Ten Darā; 10 Dollars) is a fairly well known comedy duo under the company Yoshimoto Kogyo. The group consists of the boke Hiroaki Hamamoto (浜本 広晃, Hamamoto Hiroaki) and the tsukkomi Satomi Shirakawa (白川 悟実, Shirakawa Satomi), both from Osaka Prefecture. Hamamoto is known for his half-hearted apology of "Suima Suimasen" (すいますいません; roughly "Suh-sorry") and often plays female characters in konto skits. Shirakawa is known as a skilled hand in the kitchen.
