= Tetsu and Tomo =

Japanese owarai duo

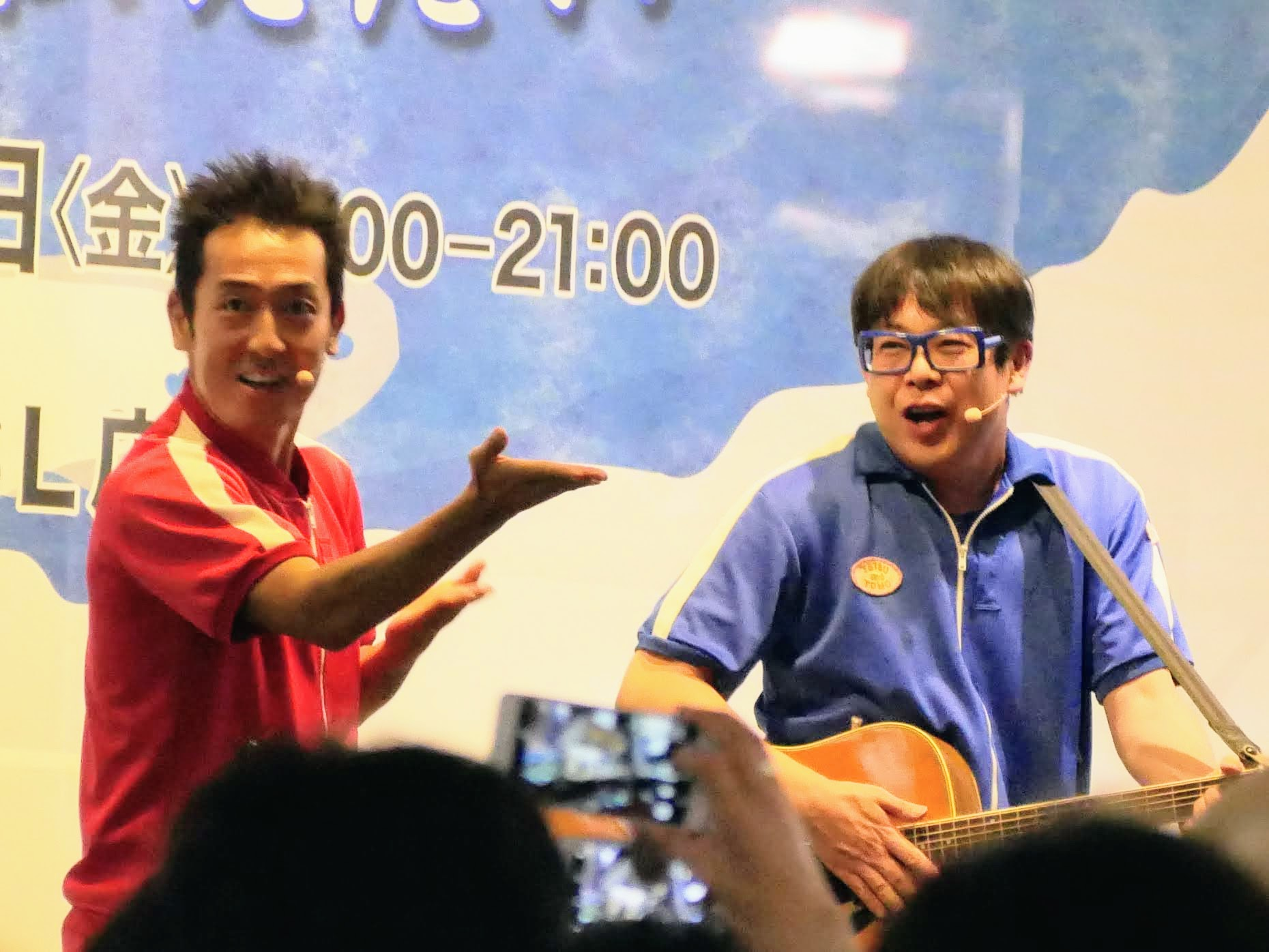
Performing live in 2018.

Tetsu and Tomo (Japanese: テツandトモ) are an owarai duo. They have made appearances on variety shows such as Bakushou. Tetsu usually dresses in red and Tomo in blue. Their act has been around since at least 2001, and is generally musical in nature. When not performing to recorded songs, Tomo plays the guitar and both men sing.

== Members ==
Tetsu (real name Tetsuya Nakamoto (中本 哲也, Nakamoto Tetsuya)), born May 9, 1970
Tetsu, also nicknamed "Tetchan", is a graduate of Nihon University. In the duo's manzai acts, he typically pays the boke role.
Tomo (real name Tomoyuki Ishizawa (石澤 智幸, Ishizawa Tomoyuki)), born May 10, 1970
Tomo, likewise a Nihon University graduate, typically plays the tsukkomi role in their manzai acts. He practices shigin, and has won an amateur singing competition (specifically the NHK Nodo Jiman).

== History ==
The two were scouted after singing at a wedding as entertainment (although the song was not comedic in nature). Both originally intended to pursue serious entertainment careers (Tetsu had hoped to become an enka singer while Tomo aspired to be an actor), but the pair ended up in comedy.

One of their most notable songs is "I wonder why" (なんでだろう, Nande darō), which pokes fun at strange yet relatable things that people do. This theme became famous as two ending theme songs to the anime Kochira Katsushika-ku Kameari Kōen-mae Hashutsujo, and the CD single, released in 2003, sold over 200,000 copies.

== See also ==
- Owarai
