= Sugi-chan =

Japanese comedian

- スギちゃん
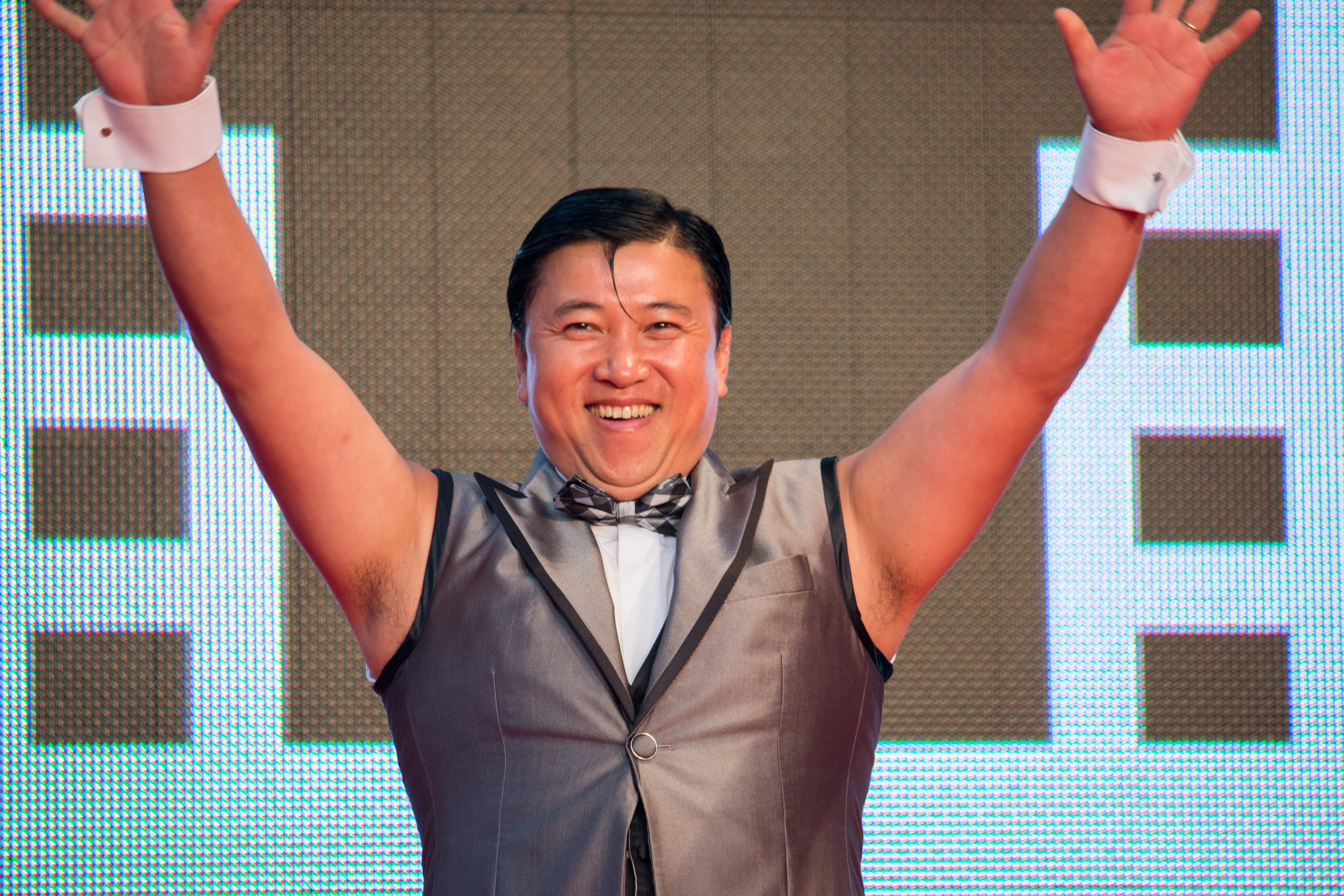
- Sugi-chan at the opening of the 28th Tokyo International Film Festival in October 2015
- Born: Eiji Sugiyama; 24 August 1973 (age 52); Aichi Prefecture, Japan
- Occupation: Comedian
- Years active: 1994 - present
- Height: 1.64 m (5 ft 5 in)
- Website: ameblo.jp/072100/

Eiji Sugiyama (杉山 英司, Sugiyama Eiji; born 24 August 1973), better known by his stage name Sugi-chan (スギちゃん), is a Japanese comedian. He has enjoyed success since 2012 with a comedy routine that frequently uses a catch line in which he describes his own antics as "wild".

== Early life ==
Sugimura was born on 24 August 1973 in Aichi Prefecture, Japan. His parents operated a weaving equipment factory and performed an amateur magician show titled "Magical Takeshi and China Yuriko". He attended the Aichi Prefectural Bisai High School and was a member of the school's baseball club.

== Professional career ==
=== Early career ===
Sugiyama commenced his career in entertainment in 1995 after graduating from the Nagoya branch of the Yoshimoto Kogyo talent school in 1994. He joined the Yoshimoto Creative Agency and was briefly in a manzai duo named "Frankfurt" with a fellow Yoshimoto member. In April 1995, he formed the duo "Reiketsu Sunday" with Noriyuki Sawahara. In 1998, they moved to Tokyo and joined the Asai Kikaku agency. Around the same time they changed the name of their act to "Mekadog" (lit. "Mechanical Dog").

=== As a solo performer ===
In January 2008, Sugiyama left Asai Kikaku, and in April, Mekadog disbanded. At this time Sugiyama started performing as a solo act. In April 2011, he joined the Sun Music management agency.

=== 2012 break ===
Upon the advice of a fortune teller, Sugiyama adopted the stage name Sugi-chan in November 2011. In March 2012, he was runner-up in the annual "R-1 Grand Prix" for solo comedians, finishing behind Kenji Tada of Cowcow. His "Wild darō?" (lit. "I'm wild, right?") catchphrase brought him national attention and an increase in his workload. In September 2012, he fractured the T-12 vertebra in his spine when diving from a 10 m high platform while filming a variety show for TV Asahi.

In December 2012, his catchphrase "Wild darō?" was chosen as the "New/Vogue Word of the Year" by the U-Can correspondence education group.

== Filmography ==
=== Television ===
- Great Teacher Onizuka (2012 version), Hajime Fukuroda
- Yomedaikō Hajimemashita (2013), opening narration
- Otenki Onēsan (The Weather Girl Knows) (2013), as himself

＊ Overseas activity Sugi-chan travels overseas and randomly gets off at a station in the city wherever he visits. He uses only junior high school level English, gestures, and intuition to search for a "station-front restaurant loved by locals", experiencing the unique flavors of that place and the human touch.

With no preparation or appointment required, the show goes into alleys that a normal travel program would never go into, and stops at general stores and street stalls in addition to restaurants. With the exception of special programs, the scene always begins with a person riding a train, getting off at the station. At the last scene he eats many dishes and evaluates all the dishes he consumed.
