= Matazō Mimata =

Japanese comedian, tarento and actor (born 1967)

- 三又 又三
- Born: Tadahisa Mimata; 27 May 1967 (age 58); Hanamaki, Iwate, Japan
- Education: Sendai Elementary School High School
- Occupations: Comedian; actor
- Years active: 1988– (Note: Although it is equivalent to Yoshimoto General Performing Arts College (NSC) for ten terms, counting from the history of Jordan's formation, I have counted three or his own artistic career from the time of the Korokke's adulthood (because he is active as a pin performer from the age of adults before forming Jordan).)
- Agent: Office Kitano
- Style: Manzai-conte boke (during his comedy duo); look-alike; suberigei; Ijiraregei
- Television: Current; Mimata no Bangumi; Former; Tamori no Vocabula Tengoku; Downtown no Gaki no Tsukai ya Arahende!!
- Height: 175 cm (5 ft 9 in)
- Partner(s): Masaya Yamazaki (Jordans; 1992–2007)
- Awards: 18th Tokyo Sports Film Award Award-winning Prize; 2015 R-1 Grand Prix Semi-Finals

Matazō Mimata (三又 又三, Mimata Matazō; born 27 May 1967, in Hanamaki, Iwate) is a Japanese comedian, tarento and actor. He is represented with Office Kitano. From 1992 to 2007, he acted as a Boke of the comedy duo Jordans with Masaya Yamazaki. His former stage name and real name is Tadahisa Mimata (三又 忠久, Mimata Tadahisa).

A former highschool amateur wrestler, Mimata has been a host to professional wrestling and combat sports shows. He has worked as a color commentator in shootboxing events, WWE tours and Pro Wrestling Zero1. On May 24, 2018, Mimata debuted as a professional wrestler in an "Electric Current Blast Death Match" in Zero1, wrestling against Taru in a losing effort.

== Filmography ==
=== Entertainment shows ===
==== Tokyo Broadcasting System ====
Title
Detekoi Owarai-kun
Maga Fushigi
Ohayō! Good Day
Wonderful
Jungle TV: Tamori no Hōsoku
Dōbutsu Kisōtengai
Daisuki! Tokyo Guest 10
Ouchi ni Kaerou!
Toku Neta! Nippon Takarajima
Lincoln
Ōsama no Oyashoku
Un-Nan no Kibunhajōjō.
Pooh!
Baribari Value
Quiz Talent Meikan
Shōgeki! One Phrase
Kinpachi-sensei
Baku! Baku! Bakushō Mondai
Sakurai Ariyoshi Abunai Yakai
Uwasa no Genba Chokkō Document: Gan mi!!
Suiyōbi no Downtown
Beat Takeshi no Zettai Micha ikenai TV
Arabikidan
All-Star Thanksgiving
Kitano Engei-kan: Takeshi ga Honki de Eranda Geinin Dai Shūketsu SP
The Monomane
The Bucchigiri TV
Exile Shijō Saidai no Surprise Bōnenkai 2012

==== Nippon TV ====
Year	Title
	Iromon
Down Town DX
Odoru! Sanma Goden!!
Ronboo Dragon
Tin Tin Town!
Heisei appare TV
Guru guru Ninety Nine
Shōten
Yamitsuki
Susunu! Denpa Shōnen
Tokujō! Tensei Shingo
Hitoshi Matsumoto-Masahiro Nakai Vs Nippon TV
24-Jikan TV
Beat Takeshi no Ima made Mitakotonai TV
Beat Takeshi no Owarai Ultra Quiz
Imada Housing
Super Jockey
Bla-Mayo no Seiki no Wakai Show
2011	Himitsu no Kenmin Show
	Sekai 1 no Show Time: Gyara o Kimeru no wa Anata
Downtown no Gaki no Tsukai ya Arahende!!
Warattehaikenai Series
Gyōretsu no dekiru Hōritsusōdanjo
Geinin Hōdō
Futtonda
Nakai no Mado
Ariyoshi Hansei-kai
2013	Kuse ni naru yayakoshi-sa: Black Mayonaise no Hatena no Kanzume
	Kinyō Super Prime
Saturday Value Fever
Getsuyō kara Yofukashi

==== TV Asahi ====
Year	Title
	Gahaha King: Bakushō-ō Kettei-sen
Ucchan Nanchan no Honō no Challenger: Korega dekitara 100 Man-en!!
Ni-Ni Na
Shinshutsukibotsu! TakeshimuKen
Tokusō TV! Gaburincho
Beat Takeshi no D-1 Grand Prix
Tetsuko no Heya
Shijō Saikyō no Mega Hit: Karaoke Best 100 Kanpeki ni Utatte 1000 Mman-en
Ring no Tamashī
"Pu'" Suma
Asamade Takeshi Gundan
Uchimura Produce
Ametalk
Kusano Kid
Saishū Keikoku! Takeshi no Hontō wa Kowai Katei no Igaku
Ninkimono de Ikō!
Tamori Club
Zatsugaku-ō
Kankan Gakugaku
Beat Takeshi no TV Tackle
Odoroki Mitai TV: Biccream
2014	Mimata no Bangumi
	Beat Takeshi no Shiranai News
Beat Takeshi no ikagana Mono-kai

==== Fuji Television ====
Year	Title
	Kitano Fan Club
Tamori no Vocabula Tengoku
Waratte Iitomo!
Mecha-Mecha Iketeru!
WWE-X
Break mono!
The Judge! Tokusuru Hōritsu File
Kotaete chōdai!
Kato-Ken-Takeshi no Seikimatsu Special!!
Ken Shimura no Baka Tonosama
Channel Kitano
Takeshi no Saitō Shinguten
Quiz Spy 2/7
Takeshi no Komanechi Daigaku Sūgakka
Takeshi no Todoroki Base
Nabe a chi'!
Quiz $ Millionaire
2010	Shimura Noki
	Shimura da yo!
Shimura Emi!
Narisumashi Akuma
Hitoshi Matsumoto no suberanai Hanashi
Daisuke Miyagawa no suberanai Hanashi
Omobaka Tryout
Utsu ke mon
Junior Chihara no Hebereke
Sanma no Owarai Kōjō Iinkai

==== TV Tokyo ====
Title	Notes
G Paradise-Quiz! Bakushō Nanmondai	
Mario School	
Hamaraja	
Takeshi no Dare demo Picasso	
Go! Go! Akkīna	
Onedari Mascot	
Yari-sugi Koji	
Inaka ni Tomarō	
Shūkan AKB	Other appearances
AriKen	
Ari nashi	
Baka Soul	
Zakkuri High Touch	

==== Others ====
Year	Title	Network
	Sky Perfect no Kōi-shitsu	
	Caesar Tamashī	
	Namade Gong! Gong!	
	GyaO Jockey	GyaO
	Culture Showq: 21 Seiki TV Kentei	tvk
	All Japan B-Banquet	Gaora
	Cocorico Shozo Endo no "Yūgengaisha Aotenjō'	Yoshimoto Fandango TV
2010	Kojima×Kano×Esper 3P	Tokyo MX
	Gintamaō	
	TokYo, Boy	

=== TV dramas ===
Year	Title	Role	Network
1998	Great Teacher Onizuka		KTV
1999	Abunai Hōkago		TV Asahi
1999	Abarenbō Shōgun	Masayukikai Murakami	TV Asahi
2000	Shijō Saiaku no Date	Examination instructor	NTV
2002	Ao ni Koishite! Soccer-tsū to 4-ri no Bijo no Monogatari		Fuji TV
2002	Shio Calbi	Yamagishi	tvk, KBS
2003	Kokoro	Drunkard	NHK
2006	Kenkyaku Shōbai	Sadakichi	Fuji TV
2010	Doyō Wide Gekijō "Shokatsu no Onna 4 – Shinjuku Nishisho: Keiji-ka Kyōkō-han-gakari"		ABC
2010	Ryōmaden		NHK G
2011	Dondo Hare		NHK G
2012	Yūsha Yoshihiko	Konpachi	TV Tokyo
2013	Lucky Seven	Nekota	Fuji TV
2013	Kakushō: Keishichō Sōsa 3-ka	Michio Shinohara	TBS
2013	Amachan	Matazo Mimata	NHK G
2014	Dr. DMat	Takeshi Nagai	TBS
2014	Tetsuko no Sodate-kata	Mashiko	NBN
2014	Chūzai Deka		TV Tokyo
2014	Smoking Gun		Fuji TV
2014	Saikyō no Onna		MBS
2014	Onna wa sore o Yurusanai	Tetsupei Okada	TBS
2015	Hanzai Shinri-gaku Kyōju-Mamoru Kanesaka no Sōsa	Tsujimoto	ABC
2015	Watashi wa Daikō-ya! Jiken Suiri Ukeoinin	Naoto Sasaki	ABC

=== Radio ===
Year	Title	Network
2002	Mokuyō Junk Summers no gyaku ni Aredaro!?	TBS Radio
2015	Appare yatte māsu!	MBS Radio
2015	Makoto Otake: Golden Radio	NCB

=== Films ===
Year	Title	Role
2008	Achilles and the Tortoise	Matozo
2008	Hitorimake	Azumi Onishi
2014	Idainaru, shurarabon	
2014	Barairo no Bū-ko	

=== Advertisements ===
Title	Ref.
Toyo Suisan Maruchan Akaikitsune to Midorinotanuki	
Chūbu House Kōgyō	
Calbee Hitokuchi Gekijō "Sono Parissukida ze" "Ganbare Mimata"	

=== Music videos ===
Artist	Song
Sendai Kamotsu	"Gei School Kan-gumi!! / Over the Geinbō"
Pachipasupo	"1.2. Surprise!"

=== Internet ===
Title	Website	Ref.
Matazō Mimata no Welcome Tokyo	YouTube	
Beat Takeshi ga Kangaeru Mōsō Men's Health Chiryō "Dansei Kōnenki-hen", "Dansei Hifu-hen"	Men's Health Clinic Tokyo	
Matazō Mimata to Al Kitago no Adrian		

=== VHS/DVD ===
Year	Title
2007	Break Angels Vol. 1
2008	Break Angels Vol. 2 –Kareinaru Tenshi–
