= Ryuhei Ueshima =

Japanese comedian and actor (1961–2022)

Ryūhei Ueshima
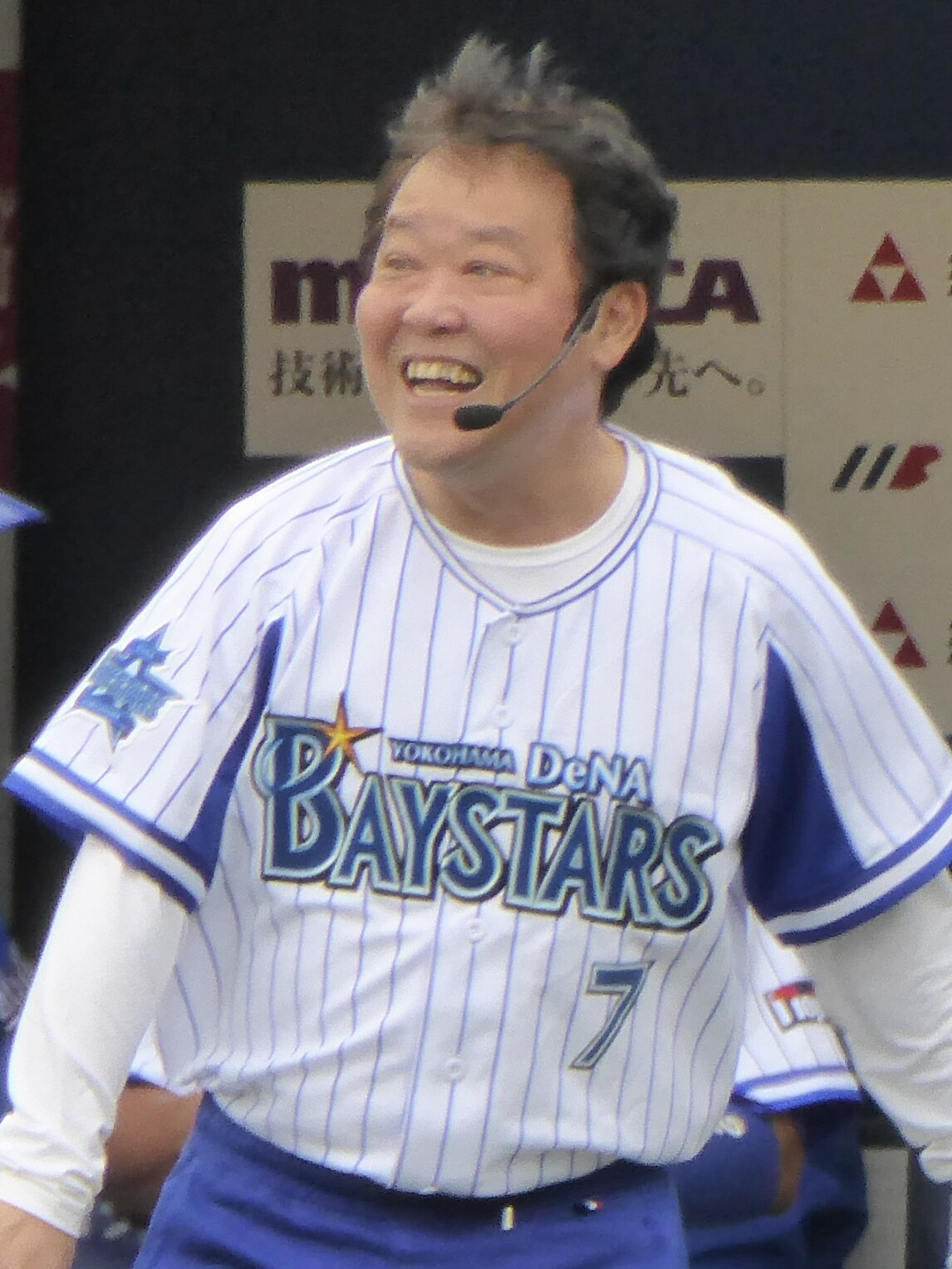
- Born: 20 January 1961; Kobe, Japan
- Died: 11 May 2022 (aged 61)
- Cause of death: Possible suicide by hanging
- Occupations: Comedian, actor

Ryūhei Ueshima (Japanese: 上島 竜兵, Hepburn: Ueshima Ryūhei; 20 January 1961 – 11 May 2022) was a Japanese comedian and actor. He was a member of the comedy trio Dachō Club.
