= Bibiru Ōki =

Japanese comedian

- ビビる 大木
- Born: Jun Ōki; September 29, 1973 (age 52); Kasukabe, Saitama, Japan
- Other name: Kasukabe no Wakadaishō (春日部 の 若大将)
- Education: Kasukabe City Tanihara Junior High School; Seibudai Chiba Junior & Senior High School
- Occupation: Comedian
- Years active: 1994–
- Agent: Watanabe Entertainment
- Known for: Uchikuru!?; Doyō Studio Park; BS Netchū Yobanashi; Pon!; Warau Inu; Richard Hall; Zenigata Kintarō; Radio de Culture; Omoikkiri Don!
- Height: 1.76 m (5 ft 9 in)
- Spouse: Akina (m. 2013)
- Relatives: Yuki Ōki (second cousin)
- Website: Official profile

Notes
- Same year/generation as: Shinagawa Shoji

Jun Ōki (大木 淳, Ōki Jun; born 29 September 1973, in Kasukabe, Saitama, Japan), better known as Bibiru Ōki (ビビる 大木; Lit. “Scaredy-Cat Oki”), is a Japanese comedian represented by Watanabe Entertainment. His wife is the singer Akina.

Ōki was a member of the comedy duo Bibiru. He graduated from Kasukabe City Tanihara Junior High School and Seibudai Chiba Junior & Senior High School. Ōki is an ambassador for Kusakabe and Hagi Furusato (hometown areas). He is also the honorary curator of the John Manjirō Museum. Ōki is a special envoy for Kōchi Prefecture tourism.

== Current appearances ==
=== TV series ===
| Year | Title | Network | Notes |
|---|---|---|---|
| | Uchikuru!? | Fuji TV | |
| 2003 | Doyō Studio Park | NHK G | |
| 2010 | Pon! | NTV | Monday, Tuesday, and Thursday MC |
| 2013 | Zenryaku, Daitoku-san | CTV | |
| 2014 | Home, Tsuiteitte Iidesu ka? | TV Tokyo | |
| 2014 | Rediscover Japan | TBS | |
| 2015 | Shumi Doki! | NHK E TV | |

Irregular appearances, specials

| Year | Title | Network | Notes |
|---|---|---|---|
| | Gyōten Panic Theater | TV Tokyo | |
| | Discovery of the World's Mysteries | TBS | |
| | Aiba Manabu | TV Asahi | |
| 2016 | Happy Monday Baseball Konshū no Pro-yakyū Tokoton Yosō | BS Sky Per | |

=== Radio series ===
| Title | Network | Notes |
|---|---|---|
| Bibiru Ōki no Brat! Brat! | NCB | |

=== Advertisements ===
| Title | Notes |
|---|---|
| Alico Japan | |
| Shiseido "uno" | |
| Asahi Food & Healthcare "Mintia" | |
| Meiji Amino Collagen Yogurt | |

=== Music videos ===
| Year | Title | Notes |
|---|---|---|
| 2011 | Hideaki Tokunaga "Kowarekake no Radio" | |
| | Sweet Licious "My Heart: Kiminitodoke Tai" | |

=== Dubbing ===
- The Little Prince, the Conceited Man

== Former appearances ==
=== TV series ===
| Year | Title | Network | Notes |
|---|---|---|---|
| | 100 Ninme no Baka | Fuji TV | |
| | A-onna E-onna | Fuji TV | |
| | Warauinu no Bōken | Fuji TV | |
| | Richard Hall | Fuji TV | |
| | Geinō Profile Deka | Fuji TV | |
| 2004 | Shinsengumi! | NHK G, NHK BS2, NHK BS hi | Episode 47 |
| | Hey! Spring of Trivia | Fuji TV | |
| | Lincoln | TBS | Semi-regular appearances |
| 2006 | Radio de Culture | NTV | |
| 2006 | Shinjuku no Haha Monogatari | Fuji TV | Lead role |
| | Zenigata Kintarō | TV Asahi | |
| | The Nippon Kentei | Fuji TV | |
| 2008 | Tameshite Gatten | NHK G | |
| 2008 | BS Fureai Stage | NHK BS2, NHK hi | |
| 2008 | BS Netchū Yobanashi | NHK BS2 | MC |
| 2008 | Sanma Akashiya Channel | TBS | |
| 2008 | Utsukushiki Aoki do Now | TV Asahi | |
| 2008 | Kumepipo! Zettai Aitai 1001-nin | TBS | Narration |
| 2008 | Matsumoto Hitoshi no Suberanai-hanashi The Golden SP 4 | Fuji TV | |
| 2009 | Omoikkiri Don! | NTV | Tuesday commentator |
| 2010 | Asian Smile | NHK G | Narration |
| 2010 | Style Plus | THK | Unscheduled appearance |
| 2010 | Ryōmaden | NHK G, NHK BS2, NHK BS hi | Final episode |
| 2011 | Shiritsu Tantei Yui Shimozawa | Fuji TV | |
| 2011 | 1-nen 1-kumi Heisei Kyōiku Gakuin | Fuji TV | Quasi-regular appearances |
| 2011 | Bakushō Dai Nihon Akan Keisatsu | Fuji TV | |
| 2011 | Motemote Ninety Nine | TBS | |
| | "Sorette Do'na hito?" Sōsa Variety G-Men 99 | TBS | |
| | Ariyoshi Dera Jikken | CBC | |
| 2015 | Hana Moyu | NHK G, NHK BS2, NHK hi | |
| 2015 | Arayuru Sekai o Kengaku Seyo: Sennyū! Real Scope | Fuji TV | |
| 2015 | Sekai Itte Mitara Honto wa Konna Tokodatta!? | Fuji TV | |

=== Radio series ===
| Year | Title | Network | Notes |
|---|---|---|---|
| | Bibiru no all night nippon-r | NBS | |
| | Jun Ōki no @llnightnippon.com | NBS | |
| | Ken Horiuchi to Bibiru Ōki no all night nippon Super Friday! | NBS | |
| | Bibiru Ōki no All Night Nippon | NBS | |
| | Bibiru Ōki no Sports Star!! | TBS Radio | |
| | Jidai Map Meeting | Fm-Kyoto, Radio-i | |
| | Keiko Kojima Kira Kira | TBS Radio | Monday appearances |
| | Wanted!! | TBS Radio | Tuesday appearances |
| 2013 | Tama Musubi | TBS Radio | Monday appearances |
| 2013 | Bibiru Ōki no All Night Nippon: All Night Nippon 45-shūnen Tokubetsu Kikaku | NBS | |
| 2013 | Bibiru 25 | Tokyo FM | |
