= Egashira 2:50 =

Japanese comedian

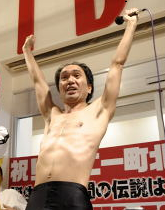
- Born: July 1, 1965 (age 61); Chiyoda, Saga, Japan
- Occupation: Comedian

Hideharu Egashira (江頭 秀晴, Egashira Hideharu; born July 1, 1965, in Chiyoda, Saga), better known by his stage name, Egashira2:50 (江頭2:50, Egashira Nijigojuppun), is a Japanese comedian. He is known for his appearances in many TV shows and his transgressive style.

== Biography ==
After graduating from Kyushu Sangyo University, Egashira moved to Tokyo hoping to become a comedian. He joined the Ookawa Kogyo company and started acting under his most known persona, Egashira 2:50.

His performance heavily relies on shock value, which the Japanese public sees as obscene and vulgar. He usually acts bare-chested and wearing black leggings and shoes, evoking a puroresu wrestler (specifically Masahiro Chono, whose music theme "Crash" by Royal Hunt was used by Egashira for a time), though he has also appeared wearing a white fundoshi. Many of his gags are very physical and capitalize on his contortionism skills to surprise the audience. His motto is "better to appear once and become a legend than to be a regular all season long."

Polls conducted in Japan by Oricon and Nikkei Entertainment! have voted him as the most annoying comedian. However, this is only a persona, as discussions on Mecha-Mecha Iketeru! have shown that he is extremely polite and humble when the camera is not rolling. He is known for extremely good manners when dealing with TV staff, which may be part of why he is still on TV. Additionally, his frequent co-stars Yūsuke Santamaria, Tsuyoshi Kusanagi and Ninety-Nine, are declared fans of Egashira.

In 2011, after the Tōhoku earthquake and tsunami disaster, Egashira rented a truck and distributed food and blankets to victims.

Egashira has visited North Korea in an attempt to meet a member of the Japanese Red Army, which he was able to do.

The song "Thrill" by Tomoyasu Hotei often plays when Egashira appears.

== Professional wrestling career ==
In 2006, Egashira appeared in puroresu promotion Hustle and even wrestled a match in its event Hustle Special House Christmas '06 on December 26. He was introduced as a heroic or babyface character, teaming up with Shinjiro Otani and Kintaro Kanemura to defeat the villainous team of Genichiro Tenryu, Toshiaki Kawada and the masked Kyou Itako.
