= Fuminori Ujihara =

Japanese comedian (born 1976)

- Born: April 20, 1976 (age 50); Shijonawate, Osaka, Japan

Comedy career
- Years active: 1996 – Present
- Medium: Owarai; Television
- Genre: Owarai

Fuminori Ujihara (宇治原 史規, Ujihara Fuminori; born April 20, 1976) is a Japanese comedian best known as the tsukkomi half of a popular owarai duo Rozan (ロザン) alongside Hirofumi Suga (菅 広文). Given his 158 IQ score, bachelor's degree in law from Kyoto University (one of the top-tier universities in the country), and championship titles from a number of TV quiz shows, he is also widely known as one of the most intelligent comedians in Japan. He is 177 cm tall and weighs 59 kg.

== Bio ==
- 1976 - Born in Shijonawate, Osaka
- 1992 - Entered Osaka Kyoiku University Tennoji High school
- 1995 - Entered Kyoto University majoring in law
- 1996 - Formed owarai duo "Rozan" with Hirofumi Suga
- 2004 - Graduated from Kyoto University

== Early life ==
Ujihara's parents are originally from Shiga prefecture. The family moved from Osaka to Hiroshima when he was four. Living there for ten years, he used to speak in the Hiroshima dialect. During his third year in junior high school, the family moved back to Osaka. Ujihara's parents were very stern since his early childhood.

He always earned outstanding grades at school, one of the top students in his year in high school. When he was a high school junior, he scored the second highest in a Yoyogi seminar's (prep school) nationwide mock exam for expected applicants of Kyoto University (for the law major). Given his grades, the prep school offered him free tuition and free mock exam fee.

Initially, he vaguely planned to be a lawyer, however, his best friend Suga invited him to be his manzai partner when Ujihara was a high school junior. Suga also recommended Ujihara to take the entrance exam of Kyoto University, assuming the school name would be a help when they become a manzai duo in the future. Ujihara accepted his offer, took the entrance exam, and passed it when he was a high school junior.

Since Ujihara had expected his parents would be against his career decision, he kept secret his activities as a comedian from them. However, one day in a TV variety show, his father saw him wearing only a shorts and chasing around money in the street. His father became furious shouting at him "Why are you going to university!?" Although His father stayed against Ujihara's comedy career, the father, having seen Ujihara's nine-year effort to graduate from the university, eventually recognized Ujihara's passion for comedy and supported his decision.

== Interests ==
Ujihara is a big fan of professional baseball team Hiroshima Toyo Carp and singer Hitomi.

== Quiz King ==
Ujihara frequently appears in quiz shows. He won championship titles in "Brain Survivor II" (TBS) a special program broadcast in the Spring of 2002 and "Quiz! Nihongo-oh" (TBS) broadcast on June 24, 2008. On the TV program "Cho Time Shock -- Saikyo Quiz-oh Ketteisen," he won the first place in his first appearance. He revealed there that he had earned approximately 5 million yen from quiz shows.

== Media ==
=== TV ===
Semi Regular
- Quiz Presen Variety Q-sama!! (クイズプレゼンバラエティー Qさま!!) -- TV Asahi
- Nekketsu! Heisei Kyoiku Gakuin (熱血!平成教育学院) -- Fuji TV/CX

Irregular
- Quiz! Hexagon (クイズ!ヘキサゴン) -- Fuji TV
- Quiz! Hexagon II (クイズ!ヘキサゴンII) -- Fuji TV
etc.
