= Toshiaki Megumi =

Japanese comedian

- 恵 俊彰
- Born: December 21, 1964 (age 61); Kagoshima, Kagoshima Prefecture, Japan
- Education: Elementary School attached to the Faculty of Education, Kagoshima University; Kagoshima Municipal Konan Junior High School; Kagoshima Prefectural Konan High School
- Occupations: Comedian, actor, television presenter, newscaster
- Years active: 1987–present
- Agent: Watanabe Entertainment
- Known for: Music Fair; Hiruobi!; King's Brunch; Salaryman Kintarō; Niji-ciao!
- Website: Official profile

Toshiaki Megumi (恵 俊彰, Megumi Toshiaki; born December 21, 1964, in Kagoshima, Kagoshima Prefecture, Japan) is a Japanese comedian, actor, television presenter, and newscaster who is a member of the comedy duo Honjamaka. He is represented by Watanabe Entertainment.

== Filmography ==
=== Television drama ===
| Year | Title | Role | Notes | Ref. |
|---|---|---|---|---|
| 1986 | Pola TV Shōsetsu | | Drama sponsored by Pola Cosmetics | |
| 1988 | Nettaiya Academy | | Two seasons (Hollywood Hills and Misty Road) | |
| 1991 | Yonimo Kimyōna Monogatari Winter Special | | Episode Dai yogen | |
| 1991 | Fushigina Gentoukan | | Episodes 37 and 42 | |
| 1993 | Neo Drama | | Episode Neta ko ni kanpai | |
| 1994 | Maido Gomen nasaai | | | |
| 1997 | Mōri Motonari (Taiga drama) | Kobayakawa Takakage | Taiga drama | |
| 1996 | Kin'yō Entertainment | | Episode Uwasa no on'na ninjō sagi-shi Sanae to Tamaki namida no jiken-bo (1 ) meikonbi tanjō! Yu no machi Ikaho ni kai jiken... | |
| 1999 – 2004 | Salaryman Kintarō (TV Series) | Ichiro Maeda | 4 regular seasons and special episode | |
| 2003 | Boku no Mahōtsukai | Kenji Kaneko | | Episode 5 |
| 2007 | Hatachi no Koibito | Takeshi Endo | | |
| 2010 | Shinzanmono | Akifumi Yoneoka | Episode 4 | |
| 2024 | Black Forceps (season 2) | Kizaki | Episode 5 | |

=== Other television ===
| Year | Title | Role | Notes | Ref. |
|---|---|---|---|---|
| 2009–present | Hiruobi! | Host | | |

=== Films ===
| Year | Title | Role | Notes | Ref. |
|---|---|---|---|---|
| 2018 | The Crimes That Bind | Akifumi Yoneoka | Cameo | |
