= Othello (comedy duo) =

Japanese comedy duo

- Osero (オセロ)
- Employer: Shochiku Geino (former)

Comedy career
- Years active: 1993–2013
- Members: Tomoko Nakajima (Tsukkomi); Nahomi Matsushima (Boke)

Othello (オセロ, Osero), is a female Japanese comedy duo (kombi) active from 1993 to 2013 who were also popular television talents and appeared frequently on Japanese variety shows.

The two comedians, Tomoko Nakajima (中島 知子), and Nahomi Matsushima (松嶋 尚美), are sometimes known as "Black" and "White" Othello, respectively, because Nakajima has darker skin than Matsushima. According to the Japanese Othello page, their duo name comes not only from their contrasting complexions, but also their personality roles, with Nakajima having the darker, more scheming character, and Matsushima playing the innocent boke role in the manzai pattern.

The duo stopped activities in 2011 and officially disbanded in 2013.

== Members ==
Tomoko Nakajima

- Date of Birth: August 26, 1971
- Birthplace: Yamashina-ku, Kyoto
- Manzai Role: Tsukkomi

Nahomi Matsushima

- Date of Birth: December 2, 1971
- Birthplace: Higashiōsaka, Osaka
- Manzai Role: Boke

== See also ==
- Owarai
- Manzai
