= Hiroshi (comedian) =

Japanese comedian

Hiroshi (ヒロシ), real name Ken'ichi Saitō (斉藤 健一, Saitō Ken'ichi; born February 23, 1972, in Arao, Kumamoto Prefecture), is a Japanese comedian famous for his stand-up act.

Originally a member (a quick-tempered tsukkomi) of a kombi called Babies (ベイビーズ), he started working as a host in Tokyo under the host name Ken Saegami (冴神剣 Saegami Ken) when Babies dissolved. Making a mere amount of yen equivalent to $800 per month, he worked as a host for nearly 3 years.

After quitting his host job, he returned to the comedy circuit with a new name, "Hiroshi"—taken from the announcer Hiroshi Ikushima (生島ヒロシ Ikushima Hiroshi)—and a new gimmick; one that would eventually gain him stardom in 2004 while landing stand-up spots on various comedy programs including the popular The god of Entertainment. (エンタの神様). His skit always follows the same formula: A simple introduction followed by a recollection of past and present pitiful episodes in his life after which he repeats, "I am Hiroshi." (ヒロシです/Hiroshi desu), while Italian singer Peppino Gagliardi's "Che vuole questa musica stasera" plays in the background.

He is always seen wearing typical host-style apparel, and he is known as a depressed character, which is reflected in his skits, and in the way he is treated by other owarai talents.
