= Dandy Sakano =

Japanese comedian (born 1967)

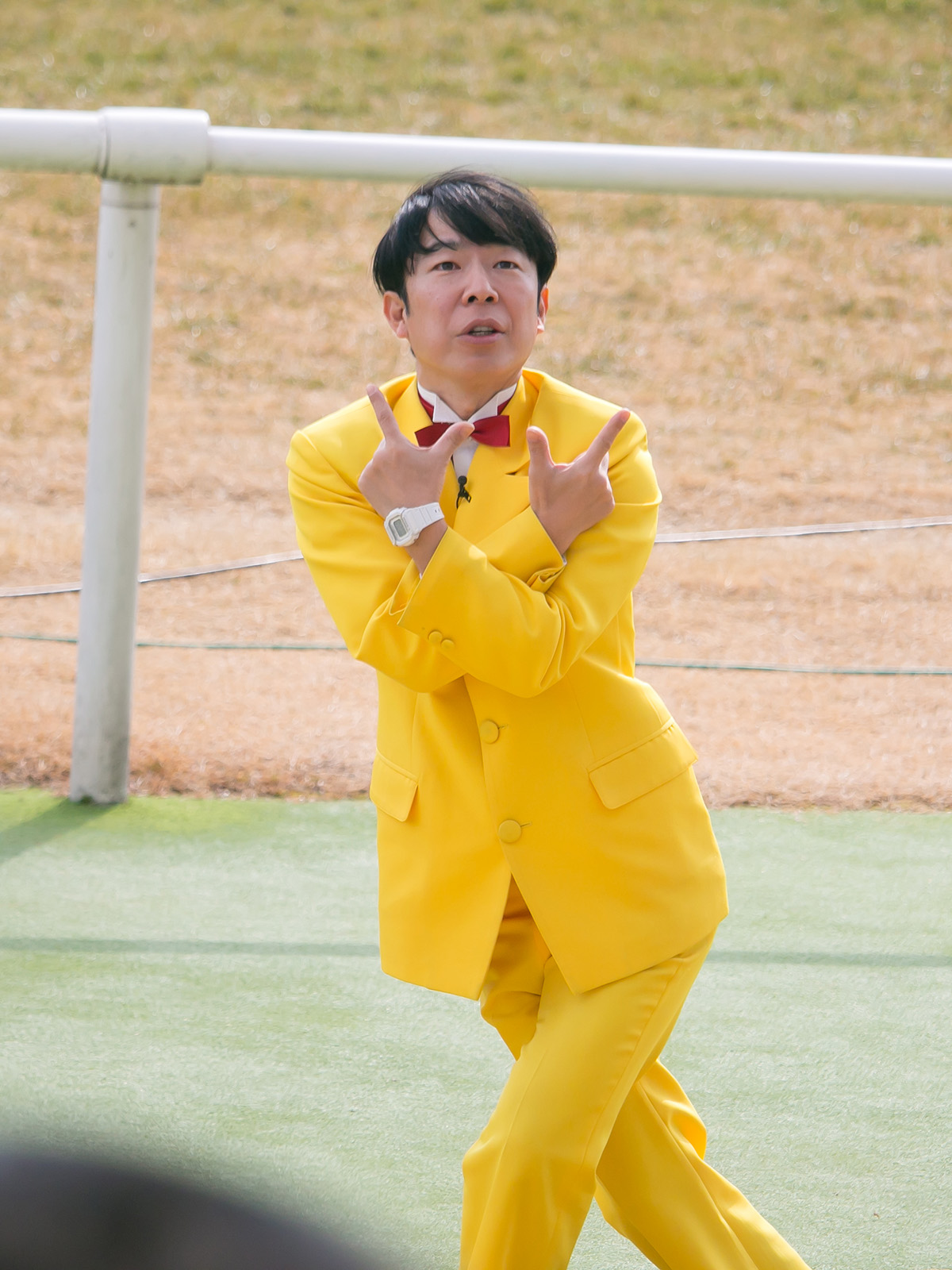
- Born: Kenichi Sakano; January 16, 1967 (age 59)

Comedy career
- Medium: television
- Website: official blog

Notes
- Same year/generation as: Shinagawa Shoji; Bakarhythm

Dandy Sakano (ダンディ坂野) (born Kenichi Sakano in Kaga, Ishikawa Prefecture, Japan on January 16, 1967) is a Japanese comedian, best known for his flamboyant clothing and "Gets" catch phrase.

A former noodle shop owner, Sakano began his comedy career in 1996. His career took off in 2003 after he featured in an advert for one of Japan's biggest pizza chains, after which he appeared on chat shows and his catchphrase became known all over Japan. In recent years, he formed a group called One Hit Wonder with three other comedians that gained temporary fame for a single gimmick. Sakano has also appeared in an advert for the insect spray Kincho, which is famous for producing silly ads in Japan.

Although he can't speak English, Sakano travelled to Dundee, Scotland, in February 2011, with the aim of making 100 people laugh. He chose the city because its name sounded similar to his. Sakano's trip was filmed for a TV show being made for Teijin Ltd, a synthetic-fibre recycling company from Japan; the premise was the "recycling" of a TV star. In one of the show's scenes, Sakano was made an honorary "Dundonian" (native of Dundee).

In December 2012 it was announced that Sakano will be appearing in a film version of Kazuto Okada's dark romantic comedy manga Ibitsu, directed by Toshiyuki Morioka. Sakano will play the role of a bar owner.
