= Cowcow =

Japanese comedy duo

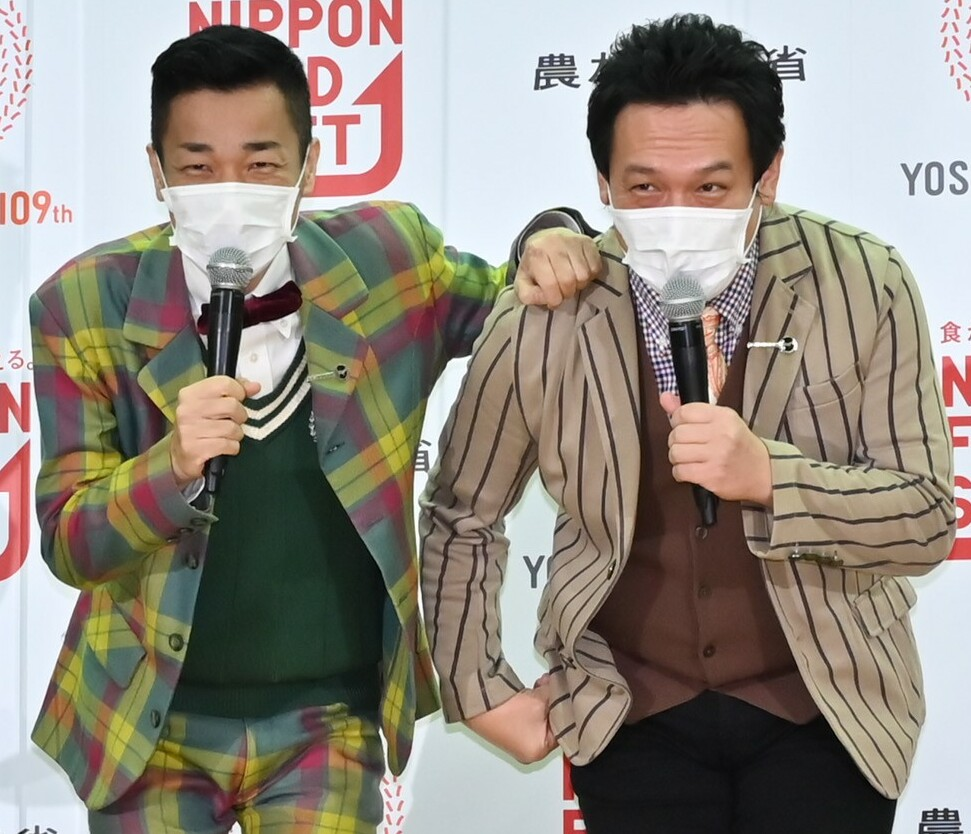

Cowcow is a Japanese comedy duo managed by the entertainment conglomerate Yoshimoto Kogyo who perform manzai comedy. The members, Yoshi (善し, born Yoshi Yamada (山田 與志, Yamada Yoshi), October 19, 1974), the tsukkomi of the group, and Kenji Tada (多田 健二, Tada Kenji, born August 8, 1974), the boke, are both from Osaka Prefecture. They have been guests on quite a few TV variety shows, such as Mecha-Mecha Iketeru!.

== Awards ==
Cowcow won the best newcomer award at the 36th Kamigata Manzai Awards in 2001.
