= Edo Harumi =

Japanese comedian and actress (born 1964)

- エド・はるみ
- Born: Haruko Kimura (木村陽子, Kimura Haruko); 14 May 1964 (age 61); Tokyo, Japan
- Education: Meiji University Faculty of Literature Department of Literature Department of Drama Studies; Keio University Graduate school of System Design and Management(Master's degree); Yen Theater Research Institute (acting); NSC Tokyo 11th Generation (performing)
- Occupations: Comedian; actress
- Years active: 1988–2004 (as an actress); 2006– (as a performer)
- Agent: Yoshimoto Creative Agency
- Style: Mandan; conte; music performance
- Television: Radi karu'; Toki meke! Week Wonder; Marathon; Omoikkiri Don!; Kono hen!! Traveller
- Height: 156 cm (5 ft 1 in)
- Awards: MTV Student Voice Awards Best Comedy Award (2008); Lipton Inspiration IST Award (2008); Dime Trend Awards Topic Award (2008); New Year Buzz Word Award (2008); Yu Tomo Awards (2008); Bowling Mass Media Grand Prize (2009); Blog of The year Comedian Entertainment Department (2009)
- Website: Official blog

Edo Harumi (エド・はるみ; born 14 May 1964, (Note: Her year of birth was calculated back.) in Tokyo) is a Japanese comedian, actress and graduate student.

Edo Harumi is represented with Yoshimoto Kogyo in Tokyo (also known as Tokyo Yoshimoto, a subsidiary of Yoshimoto Creative Agency).

She spent her childhood in Ibaraki Prefecture, Chiba Prefecture and Tokyo. Edo Harumi graduated from Meiji University Faculty of Literature Department of Literature Department of Drama Studies. She is known in variety programmes as -gū (○○グゥ〜).

== Filmography ==
=== Variety ===
Regular

Year	Title	Network
2007	Marathon	tvk
2008	Radi karu'	NTV
2008	Toki meke! Week Wonder	Fuji TV
2009	Omoikkiri Don!	NTV
2009	Kono hen!! Traveller	FBS
2010	Zenkai Hatsuratsu Comedy: Owarai Doctor 24-ji! !	ABC
2010	Dō suru? Tokyo	Tokyo MX
	Kiyoshi Nishikawa no Goendesu!	THK
2012	Yamagata Hatsu! Tabi no Kenmonroku	YBC, TV Saitama

Current appearances

Year	Title	Network
	Enta no Kamisama	NTV
2006	Yari-sugi Koji	Yoshimoto Fandago TV
2006	Yoshimoto Gendai	TV Tokyo
2006	Warai no Hanamichi	TV Tokyo
2007	Apache Night Fuji	Fuji TV
	Bakushō Red Carpet	Fuji TV

=== TV dramas ===
Year	Title	Role	Network
1989	Yūhi o Abite	Travel company receptionist	NHK-G
1990	Otto, abunai		YTV
1990	Tabi no hajimari		NHK-G
2008	Tomorrow: Yō wa mata noboru	Kazuko Harada	TBS
2008	Engine Sentai Go-onger	Barbaric Machine Beast Dowsing Banki (voice)	TV Asahi
2008	Koi o Sute Yume ni Kaketa Onna: Edo Harumi Monogatari	Herself (Harumi Tagashi)	Fuji TV
2010	Renzoku Drama Shōsetsu: Kinoshita Buchō to Boku	Sakura Ijuin	YTV
2010	Gold	Seiko Niwa	Fuji TV
2011	Shimashima	Reiko Momose	TBS
2014	Isha-ryō Bengoshi: Anata no Namida, Okane ni Kaemashou	Akiko Tokai	YTV
2014	The Long Goodbye	Nurse	NHK-G
2014	Ao no Umi: Long Summer	Bunko Taira	THK
2015	Keibuho Shintaro Sugiyama: Kichijōji-sho Jiken File	Lecturer	TBS

=== Anime television ===
Year	Title	Role	Network
2008	Yatterman	Herself, Ed Hamilton	YTV

=== TV shopping ===
Year	Title	Network
2010	Wacoal: Wellness Time	Terrestrial TV Commercial Stations CS

=== Radio ===
Year	Title	Network
2010	Masahiko Ueyanagi: Go go ban!	NBS

=== Stage ===
Year	Title	Role
2006	Kazuyuki Sakuma: Tandoku Live	
2006	Yoshimoto Haru no Pin Matsuri –Ji ni Kuru Pin Geinin wa dareda?–	
2006	5-ji 6-ji	
2006	Yoshimoto Shinjin Keikaku	
2006	Dai 5-kai Prince of Prince	
2006	Wakatsuki: Tandoku –Family–	
2006	Hiking Walking Tandoku Live –Kyara Hyakuretsuken / Q-chan Gekidan–	
2006	Yoshimoto Next Generation –Ichiya Kagiri no Unit Conte–	
2006	Dotō no Shin Neta Conte 20 Renpatsu!!!!!!!	
2006	Dotō no Dhin Neta Manzai Mandan 20 Renpatsu!!!!!!!	
2007	Dai 1-kai Pingeki Kōen –Tsuki no Mieru Mise–	
2007	1-ji 3-ji –Garage Sale– Special Contest	
2007	Yōshichi Shimada-hai –Ga Bai Shinjin Grand Prix–	
2007	Live Stand 07 / Age-Mon Stage	
2007	Dotō no Shin Neta 20 Renpatsu!!!!!!!	
2008	Live Stand 08 / Age-Mon Stage	
2008	Live Stand 08 Osaka / Cona-Mon Stage, Kawaki-Mon Stage	
2009	Live Stand 09 / Age-Mon Stage	
2009	Kagayake! Shufu Band Four Rivers Smoke on the Water 2009	Misako inokuchi

=== Narration ===
Year	Title	Network
	Bakushō Red Carpet	Fuji TV
2006	Roman Specials	
2006	Yoshimoto Fandango TV programme advertisement	
2006	Shinjuku Lumine the Yoshimoto advertisement	
2007	Itadaki Mugendai	Yoshimoto Fandango TV
2007	Obi Radi R	TBS
2007	Razer Ramon Tandoku Live	Lumine the Yoshimoto
2007	Yoshimoto Prezents Live Stand 07 Dai Vision-yō advertisement	

=== Broadband ===
Year	Title
2006	Shigeyuki Mizuno Haishin
2006	Yoshimoto Nagare Akaruku Net –Higawari Gag–
2006	"Waka" Gag: Omnibus
2007	Choro Q de Curling
2007	Kurohige Kikiippatsu!!
2007	Kurohige Kikiippatsu "Edo-ryū Sahō"
2007	Choro Q "Edo-ryū Sahō"

=== Magazines ===
Year	Title
2006	Yomiuri Shimbun –Entertainment-Ran–
2006	Cyzo
2006	Flash
2006	Friday

=== Films ===
Year	Title	Role
1981	Something Like It	High school girl
1986	Final Take	
1986	Tora-san's Bluebird Fantasy	
1992	Kuma-chan	Jave's guest
2008	Gekijō-ban Major: Yūjō no Ichi-kyū	Ugisu (voice)
2009	Pretty Cure All Stars	Dance contest presenter (voice)

=== Advertisements ===
Year	Title
2008	H.I.S.
2008	Procter & Gamble Herbal Essence
2008	livestar Securities
2008	Sapporo Brewery Hokkaidō Namashibori-migaki Mugi
2008	Rohto Pharmaceutical Rohto Bita 40α, Rohto Cool 40α
2008	Ministry of Land, Infrastructure, Transport and Tourism Jidōsha Tenken Seibi Suishin Kyōgi-kai Jidōsha Tenken Seibi Suishin Undō
2008	Lipton Flavor Tea
2008	Odyssey Communications Microsoft Nintei Shikaku
	House Foods "Curry Nabe tsuyu: Shufu Band" "Shufu Band Tōjō Kokuchi"

=== Music videos ===
Year	Title
2008	Southern All Stars "I Am Your Singer"
2009	Team Syachihoko "Ii Kurashi"

== Discography and bibliography ==
=== CD ===
Year	Title
2008	"Gūgū Sun Ba!"

=== DVD ===
Year	Title
2008	Gūgū Taisō

=== Books ===
Year	Title	ISBN code
2008	Seijin-shiki wa Ni-do Oete orimasu	ISBN 978-4847017803
2010	30-Nichi de Jinsei o kaeru Manner no Hon	ISBN 978-4915933240
