= Owarai =

Japanese comedy genre

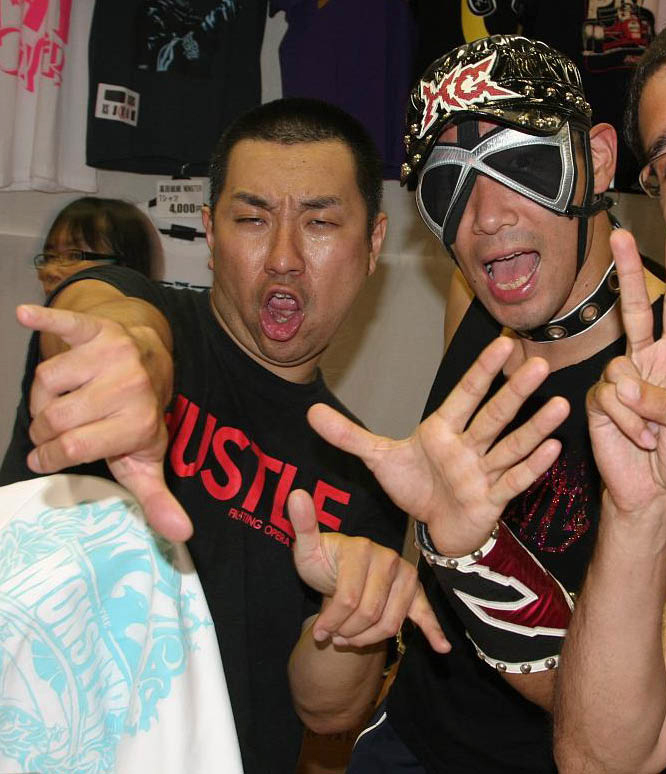
Comedy duo Razor Ramon RG and Razor Ramon HG

Owarai (お笑い) is a broad word used to describe Japanese comedy as seen on television. The word owarai is the honorific form of the word warai (by adding o- prefix), meaning "a laugh" or "a smile". Owarai is most common on Japanese variety shows and the comedians are referred to as owarai geinin or owarai tarento. Presently Japan is considered to be in an "owarai boom", and many minor talents have been finding sudden fame after a gag or skit became popular.

== Characteristics ==
Manzai (漫才), a traditional form of Japanese comedy that became the basis of many modern acts today, is characterized by a pair of usually older male comedians acting certain roles in a constant comedic battle against themselves. This tradition is continued in the acts of many modern talents.

Whereas manzai performers traditionally wore kimono (traditional Japanese dress), these days a western suit is the outfit of choice for many owarai kombi (コンビ, combination; referring to a pair of comedians in a unit) and many talents who begin their careers performing in a style very similar to stand-up comedy, usually including aspects of manzai and conte.

Some minor characteristics include frequently used sound effects (cheap, old-fashioned sound effects are used intentionally for comic effect), dajare (ダジャレ, a Japanese-style pun), and dokkiri (ドッキリ, a hidden-camera prank like those seen in the popular American show Candid Camera).

== Owarai geinin ==
On television, most owarai geinin are introduced using their kombi name (e.g. Yoiko Hamaguchi) and some geinin even retain the name of their former groups after they have parted ways.

A few popular kombi include:

- とんねるず Tunnels
- ダウンタウン Downtown
- ナインティナイン Ninety-nine
- 爆笑問題 Bakushō Mondai
- 極楽とんぼ Gokuraku Tombo
- ココリコ Cocorico
- キャイ〜ン Kyaeen
- オードリー Audrey
- アンタッチャブル Untouchable
- インパルス Impulse
- オセロ Othello, a rare female kombi
- くりぃむしちゅー Cream Stew
- さまぁ～ず Summers
- ネプチューン Neptune
- 次長課長 Jichō Kachō
- サンドウィッチマン Sandwichman
- スピードワゴン Speed Wagon
- TIM TIM
- チュートリアル Tutorial
- ペナルティ Penalty
- よゐこ Yowiko
- ラーメンズ Rahmens
- レギュラー Regular
- ジャングルポケット Jungle Pocket

Many owarai units have names based on English words or phrases. Kombi are usually included as guests for shows, though some (namely Downtown, Cream Stew, and Ninety-nine) often act as hosts as well.

Some popular talents that usually do not perform in units are:

- 志村けん Ken Shimura
- 明石家さんま Sanma Akashiya
- タモリ Tamori
- ビートたけし Beat Takeshi
- 加藤茶 Cha Katō
- 島田紳助 Shinsuke Shimada
- 出川哲朗 Tetsurō Degawa
- 江頭2:50 Egashira 2:50
- 所ジョージ George Tokoro
- 内村光良 Teruyoshi Uchimura
- 古坂大魔王 Daimaou Kosaka
- 長州小力 Koriki Chōshū
- ヒロシ Hiroshi
- 関根勤 Tsutomu Sekine
- 藤井隆 Takashi Fujii
- 清水ミチコ Michiko Shimizu
- ホリ Hori
- 青木さやか Sayaka Aoki, another rare female act
- 陣内智則 Tomonori Jinnai
- 千原ジュニア Chihara Junior

Of these, Sanma, Tamori, and Beat Takeshi are sometimes referred to collectively as the "big three" because of their massive popularity. Talents such as these often act as hosts for shows, or perform together in small or large groups, something almost unimaginable for most western comedians.

== Variety shows ==
Japanese variety shows are the main outlet for most owarai geinin and along with drama and anime they are some of the most popular shows on Japanese television.

As a general term in Japan, "variety show" can refer to "straight" variety shows with an appropriate myriad of topics, segments, and games. It is also used for comedy oriented shows that focus more on stand-up and skits, and quiz/trivia type shows featuring comic elements. It is not to be expected that a variety show will always follow the same format, and guests from Japanese music and talent pools are frequent.

The variety style shows generally divided into segments of games, features, and "corners", some very short and some shows focusing (for a special episode) solely on one game or feature. Trivia, quiz, or game shows in Japan are often considered owarai as the contestants of such shows are often a mix of owarai geinin and other Japanese talents of various descriptions. Game shows without any famous characters playing the role of contestants are rare.

Of these sections and games, many can be seen recurring on a variety of shows all across Japan. It may even be possible to classify Japanese variety shows (or at least the individual sections of the shows) according to the following formats:

- Quizzes or trivia (with subjects as varied as 雑学 (zatsugaku, general or useless knowledge), math, science, history and other school subjects, kanji (testing peoples' knowledge of difficult or rare characters), English, and a mishmash of typical quiz-style trick questions
- Food judgement/tasting/making (various types of food are also commonly used as prizes for the winner of a game)
- Travel (often travelling within Japan to view someones estate or around the world producing short, documentary-style segments about world culture, with a comic twist)
- Physical challenges, tests of strength/endurance etc.
- Tests of improvised comic skill (for example, a dajare contest)
- Obstacle courses/collections of strange games or activities
- Music (Either with real Japanese musicians, or with owarai geinin trying their hands at music (often karaoke style), covering popular songs or showing off their own)

Some concepts of variety shows are consistent over most of Japanese television, though they may be considered quite different from those seen in the western world. Many shows are made up of what are called VTRs, or video segments, and are usually introduced with a hand gesture and the word dōzo (the implied meaning is "let's have a look"), though this procedure is usually made into a joke with strange gestures instead of the usual wave.

A few popular variety/comedy shows of varying contents are:

- 笑いの金メダル King of Comedy (showcasing the stand-up acts and skits of new and popular talent, often featuring VTR segments of the activities of various talents)
- エンタの神様 The God of Entertainment (similar to King of Comedy, though focusing on stand-up acts)
- とんねるずのみなさんのおかげでした The Tunnels' Thanks to Everyone (the origin of the international Brain Wall television franchise, hosted by duo Tunnels)
- 愛のエプロン Apron of Love (talents lacking cooking skill are asked to cook difficult dishes and are given harsh, though honest, judgements)
- SMAP×SMAP SMAP×SMAP (the five members of the immensely popular group SMAP host many different shows, presenting segments such as music, cooking, and news)
- 銭形金太郎 Zenigata Kintarō (this show's segment bimbō batoru (battle of the poor) showcases the life of two or more people living in Japan who support interesting life styles on minimum amounts of money; the funniest, or most inspiring bimbō wins)
- Matthew's Best Hit TV+ (hosted by the comedian Takashi Fujii, this show features musical guests and a strange variety of games and unrelated segments)
- トリビアの泉 Spring of Trivia (showcasing interesting and strange facts (or strange interpretations of boring facts) of little or no importance using a trivia-style format)
- ネプリーグ Nep-league (featuring the owarai trio Neptune on one of the two teams of contestants, this quiz show features various "levels" of play challenging the players' knowledge of everything from world events to reading Japanese to spelling simple English words)
- 志村けんのバカ殿様 Ken Shimura no Baka Tono-sama (hosted by comedian Ken Shimura)

== See also ==
- List of Japanese comedians
- Manzai
- Glossary of owarai terms
- Nininbaori
