= Terrace House: Aloha State =

Japanese reality television series

- The initial cast of Terrace House: Aloha State.
- Genre: Reality
- Presented by: You, Reina Triendl, Yoshimi Tokui, Azusa Babazono, Ryota Yamasato, Kentaro
- Opening theme: "New Romantics" by Taylor Swift (Japan) "Slow Down" by Matthew Heath & Grady Griggs (International)
- Ending theme: "Chasing Cars" by Snow Patrol (Japan) "Slow Down" by Matthew Heath & Grady Griggs (International)
- Country of origin: Japan
- Original language: Japanese
- No. of episodes: 36

Production
- Production company: Fuji Television

Original release
- Network: Fuji TV (Japan); Netflix (international)
- Release: November 1, 2016 – August 29, 2017

Related
- Terrace House: Boys & Girls in the City; Terrace House: Opening New Doors

Terrace House: Aloha State (Japanese: テラスハウス アロハ ステート, Hepburn: Terasu Hausu Aroha Sutēto) is a Japanese reality television series in the Terrace House franchise set in Hawaii. It premiered on Netflix as a Netflix Original on November 1, 2016 and ended on August 29, 2017. It is a Netflix and Fuji co-production which is also broadcast on Fuji Television in Japan. This is the first overseas edition of Terrace House. This season was originally planned to last for 24 episodes, but got extended to 36 episodes mid-season.

== Cast ==
=== Main cast ===
№	Name			Occupation	Birth date	Age*	Appearance	
№	English	Japanese	Nickname	Occupation	Birth date	Age*	Eps	#
01	Lauren Tsai	ローレン・サイ	Lauren	aspiring illustrator, model	February 11, 1998	18	01–17	17
02	Yuya Shibusawa	澁澤侑哉	Yuya	aspiring actor	January 20, 1998	18	01–22	22
03	Avian Ku	エビアン・クー	Avian	salesclerk	September 4, 1990	26	01–22	22
04	Eric De Mendonca	エリック デ メンドンサ	Eric	carpenter	August 11, 1989	27	01–12	12
05	Naomi Lorraine Frank	フランク奈緒美ロレイン	Naomi	undecided	January 9, 1993	23	01–10	10
06	Yusuke Aizawa	鮎澤悠介	Yusuke/Eden Kai	musician, ukulele player	September 24, 1998	18	01–10	10
07	Anna Haneishi	羽石杏奈	Anna	part-timer	September 13, 1994	22	10–25	16
08	Taishi Tamaki	玉城大志	Taishi	actor	June 21, 1987	29	10–36	27
09	Guy Sato	佐藤魁	Guy	pro surfer	November 17, 1996	20	12–30	19
10	Niki Niwa	丹羽仁希	Niki	university student	October 15, 1996	20	17–25	9
11	Cheri Maria Sumikawa Lavoie	シェリ・マリア・澄川・ラボエ	Cheri	realtor	March 24, 1991	25	22–36	15
12	Wesley Nakajima	中嶋ウェスリー	Wez	rapper	March 1, 1988	29	22–36	15
13	Jennifer Mila Hasegawa	長谷川 ジェニファー ミラ	Mila	undecided	July 7, 1997	19	25–30	6
14	Chikako Fukuyama	福山智可子	Chika	spa receptionist	November 8, 1988	28	26–36	11
15	Mariko Nitta	新田満里子	Mariko	banker	September 18, 1991	25	30–36	7
16	Ryo Sekikawa	関川良	Ryo	retailer	December 7, 1990	26	30–36	7

*Age when they first joined Terrace House.

=== Guest appearances ===
Name	Japanese	Cast member	Episode(s)
Seina Shimabukuro	島袋聖南	Boys × Girls Next Door	Part 1 Episode 7
Daiki Ito	伊東大輝	Boys × Girls Next Door	Part 1 Episode 7
Arman Bitaraf	ビタラフ・アルマン	Boys & Girls in the City	Part 3 Episode 3 / Part 4 Episode 9
Masako Endo	遠藤政子	Boys & Girls in the City	Part 3 Episode 3 / Part 4 Episode 9
Masato Yukawa	湯川正人	Boys × Girls Next Door	Part 4 Episode 3

== Episodes ==
No. in Season	No. in Part	Title	Netflix release date	Television air date	Length (mins)
Part 1
1	1	"Terrace House in Aloha State"	November 1, 2016	November 28, 2016	35
Terrace House is back with six new members! As they slowly trickle in, they get acquainted with each other and their beautiful new home.
2	2	"The 18-Year-Old Madonna"	November 8, 2016	December 5, 2016	34
The house blackboard is filling up with everyone's plans. Lauren takes Yuya and Naomi into town and the three bond at Coffee Talk.
3	3	"The Reason Why He Can't Get a Girlfriend"	November 15, 2016	December 12, 2016	31
Avian helps Naomi find a restaurant job. Yuya heads to his language school to take a placement test. Lauren's drawings continue to improve.
4	4	"More Than a Hug"	November 22, 2016	December 19, 2016	33
Avian and Lauren meet with Eric to encourage him to apologize to Naomi. Naomi's job interview goes well and she thanks Yusuke for his help.
5	5	"Living in a Shared House Is Tough"	December 6, 2016	January 9, 2017	36
Everyone heads to Waimea Bay Beach Park, where Lauren explains what happened with her job. Later, Yuya and Yusuke talk about relationships.
6	6	"Making My Move"	December 13, 2016	January 16, 2017	30
Eric and Lauren go to the farmer's market to try some coconut. Naomi successfully hostesses her first table. Yusuke has a heart-to-heart with his dad.
7	7	"She Is a Legend"	December 20, 2016	January 23, 2017	36
Naomi asks Yuya out, but he turns her down. Later, she overhears him making plans with Avian. Yusuke and Avian check out Lauren's fashion show.
8	8	"Taste of Catfish on the First Date"	December 27, 2016	January 30, 2017	37
Yusuke prepares for his date with Lauren, but she's apprehensive. Yuya tells Avian he's serious about her, but she thinks Naomi may be a better match.
Part 2
9	1	"Black Tears"	January 10, 2017	February 6, 2017	34
Avian helps Yusuke get over his date. Meanwhile, Naomi has a special request for Avian, who puts pressure on Lauren to change her Thanksgiving plans.
10	2	"It's You"	January 17, 2017	February 13, 2017	39
The residents hold back their tears and see Naomi off. Eric likes Lauren, but worries about the age gap. Avian and Yuya enjoy a candlelit dinner.
11	3	"A Love to Die For"	January 24, 2017	February 20, 2017	36
The housemates meet the new male cast member, Taishi, who's looking for a love to die for. At age 29, he doesn't want to waste any time.
12	4	"Pretty Guy"	January 31, 2017	February 27, 2017	36
Taishi and Avian spend some quality time together, then Anna and Taishi share a hug. Eric leaves the House and a new cast member arrives.
13	5	"A Secret Crush"	February 14, 2017	March 13, 2017	41
Pro surfer Guy shows his skills. Yuya and Avian head out for a romantic Christmas dinner that starts well but ends on a disappointing note.
14	6	"Love Kicks Off"	February 21, 2017	March 20, 2017	41
The house attends Lauren's art exhibition. She's crushing on Taishi but confesses to Avian that she's never asked a guy out on a date before.
15	7	"One Direction"	February 28, 2017	April 10, 2017	43
Lauren and Taishi head out on their nighttime walk together. Later, he invites Anna on a horseriding date. Guy changes his image in an unexpected way.
16	8	"The Pipeline: Where Surfing Lives"	March 7, 2017	April 17, 2017	38
Lauren prepares for a big change. The members head to Ehukai Beach Park to see Guy surf the Pipeline, but he comes home with an unfortunate surprise.
Part 3
17	1	"Shirofune"	March 21, 2017	April 24, 2017	38
The house undergoes a tearful transition, Yuya rethinks the status of his relationship, and a new member makes her first appearance at the house.
18	2	"Everyone's Sweetheart"	March 28, 2017	May 1, 2017	44
Taishi takes the lead at dinner with cute new member Niki. The house reacts to Yuya and Avian's announcement. Lauren, a former member, reappears to meet Guy in Japan.
19	3	"A Long & Winding Road to Love"	April 4, 2017	May 8, 2017	39
Guy finally makes his return to surfing and has a long chat with Taishi afterward. Niki tells Taishi about the results of her job interview.
20	4	"Guilty Samurai"	April 11, 2017	May 15, 2017	47
Guy makes an exciting announcement to the house. A worried Taishi turns to Avian for romantic guidance, then dispenses some life advice to Yuya.
21	5	"Plan it or Wing it"	April 25, 2017	May 21, 2017	42
Taishi and Niki head to the climbing gym for their well-planned date. Later, Niki and Guy hang out in the living room together.
22	6	"Losing the Lead Role"	May 2, 2017	June 5, 2017	32
The house -- and Yusuke reappears to -- attend Avian's swimsuit brand launch party. Two residents depart and two new members prepare to enter the house.
23	7	"She's Not Much of a Nature-Lover"	May 9, 2017	June 12, 2017	38
Guy and Niki spend the day at the beach, then head to Cinnamon's to catch a show. Later that night, Taishi and Cheri have a chat by the pool.
24	8	"A Kiss in the Moment"	May 16, 2017	June 19, 2017	35
Cheri confronts Taishi about his womanizing ways. Guy asks Niki directly about their date, and about her impending departure.
Part 4
25	1	"I Love You, Sayonara"	May 30, 2017	July 3, 2017	38
Guy and Niki still haven't talked about their feelings directly. It's the night before Niki's departure, but she might not be the only one leaving.
26	2	"Erotic Frequency"	June 6, 2017	July 10, 2017	31
Two new housemates join the group: former fashion student Jennifer Mila and long-term Hawaii resident Chikako. Taishi is smitten with Chikako.
27	3	"No One Like You"	June 13, 2017	July 17, 2017	34
Moving fast, Taishi invites Chikako on a date to an izakaya. Meanwhile, Cheri and Mila go see Eric and plan to attend Wez's show.
28	4	"Isn't She Just a Bitch?"	June 20, 2017	July 24, 2017	34
After hitting it off on their date, Taishi and Chikako make plans to go hiking together. Cheri and Eric meet for breakfast, but she has other plans.
29	5	"Too Much"	July 4, 2017	July 31, 2017	38
Pouring rain interrupts Taishi and Chikako's hiking trip. Guy and Mila make dinner plans, while Cheri tells Eric she's been seeing other guys.
30	6	"The Secret Hook Up"	July 11, 2017	August 7, 2017	34
Guy's departure date approaches while everyone teases Taishi about giving Chikako socks. Late one night, Cheri and Eric go out drinking.
31	7	"Lonesome Women"	July 18, 2017	August 14, 2017	33
After spending the night with Eric, Cheri goes on a date with Connor, a Russian college student. Anna comes to visit her old housemates.
32	8	"The Monster She Made"	July 25, 2017	August 21, 2017	35
Salaryman Ryo moves in from Japan and immediately gets into surfing. After asking about Taishi's feelings, Chikako goes for coffee with Ryo.
33	9	"The Blues of Bruno Mars"	August 8, 2017	September 4, 2017	41
After her ex-husband sends her a message saying he still loves her, Chikako agrees to meet him. Later, she talks with Taishi.
34	10	"Breakdown"	August 15, 2017	September 11, 2017	40
Taishi takes point at a tense house meeting in which the members tell Cheri they feel disrespected. The next day she goes on a picnic with Ryo.
35	11	"Shinuhodo No Koi"	August 22, 2017	September 18, 2017	35
Taishi is about to turn 30, and he plans a big date with Chikako, writing out a script the night before. The housemates try Kona coffee.
36	12	"Bye Bye Terrace House in Aloha State"	August 29, 2017	September 25, 2017	29
The other housemates decide to leave early so Taishi and Chikako can have a night alone. Everyone is making plans to go to Japan.
