= Terrace House: Boys & Girls in the City =

Japanese reality television series

- The initial cast of Terrace House: Boys & Girls in the City.
- Genre: Reality
- Presented by: You, Reina Triendl, Yoshimi Tokui, Azusa Babazono, Ryota Yamasato, Ayumu Mochizuki, Kentaro
- Opening theme: "New Romantics" by Taylor Swift (Japan) "Slow Down" by Lights Follow (Matthew Heath & Grady Griggs) (International)
- Ending theme: "Chasing Cars" by Snow Patrol (Japan) "Slow Down" by Lights Follow (Matthew Heath & Grady Griggs) (International)
- Country of origin: Japan
- Original language: Japanese
- No. of seasons: 1
- No. of episodes: 46

Production
- Production companies: Fuji Television; East

Original release
- Network: Fuji TV (Japan); Netflix (international)
- Release: September 2, 2015 – September 27, 2016

Related
- Terrace House: Closing Door; Terrace House: Aloha State

Terrace House: Boys & Girls in the City (Japanese: テラスハウス ボーイズ＆ガールズ イン・ザ・シティ, Hepburn: Terasu Hausu Bōizu ando Gāruzu in za Shiti) is a Japanese reality television series in the Terrace House franchise. It is the first in the franchise to be co-produced by Fuji TV and Netflix and the first to be released internationally. It premiered on Netflix as a Netflix Original on September 2, 2015, and was also broadcast on Fuji Television in Japan.

== Cast ==
=== Main cast ===
No.	Name			Occupation	Birth date	Age*	Appearance	
No.	English	Japanese	Nickname	Occupation	Birth date	Age*	Eps	#
01	Makoto Hasegawa	長谷川慎	Makocchan	university student/baseball player	November 21, 1993	22	01–11	11
02	Minori Nakada	中田みのり	Minori	university student/model	February 1, 1994	21	01–24	24
03	Yuki Adachi	安達雄基	Yuki/Tap	tap dancer	August 19, 1987	27	01–17	17
04	Mizuki Shida	信太美月	Mizuki/Barista	office worker	December 8, 1992	22	01–17	17
05	Tatsuya Uchihara	内原達也	Uchi	hair stylist	December 22, 1991	23	01–24	24
06	Yuriko Hayata	早田悠里子	Yuriko/Yuri	medical student	April 6, 1992	23	01–13	13
07	Arman Bitaraf	ビタラフ・アルマン	Ah-man	aspiring firefighter	December 4, 1990	24	11–46	36
08	Arisa Ohata	大畑ありさ	Arisa	hat designer	October 5, 1990	25	13–28	16
09	Hikaru Ota	太田光る	Hikaru	model	March 1, 1997	18	19–32	14
10	Natsumi Saito	斎藤夏美	Nacchan	model	July 25, 1989	26	19–32	14
11	Misaki Tamori	田森美咲	Tamosan	entertainer (Ebisu Muscats)	June 25, 1992	23	24–46	23
12	Yuto Handa	半田悠人	Han-san	architect	November 11, 1988	27	25–35	11
13	Riko Nagai	永井理子	Rikopin	high school student/gravure model	December 21, 1997	18	29–46	18
14	Momoka Mitsunaga	光永百花	Momo-chan	ballerina	May 11, 1995	20	32–39	8
15	Hayato Terashima	寺島速人	Hayato-kun	chef apprentice	January 27, 1987	29	32–46	15
16	Yuuki Byrnes	バーンズ勇気	Byrnes	hip hop dancer	December 27, 1992	23	36–46	11
17	Masako Endo	遠藤政子	Martha	model	August 9, 1993	23	39–46	8

*Age when they first joined Terrace House.

=== Guest appearances ===
Name	Japanese	Cast member	Connection
Seina Shimabukuro	島袋聖南	Boys × Girls Next Door	model at Girls Award
Daiki Miyagi	宮城大樹	Boys × Girls Next Door	employee of Target gym
Ippei Shima	島一平	Boys × Girls Next Door	employee of Target gym
Kurumi Nakada	中田クルミ	—	Minori's older sister

== Episodes ==
Season	Episodes		Originally released	
Season	Episodes		First released	Last released
1	46	18	September 2, 2015	January 25, 2016
1	46	28	February 8, 2016	September 27, 2016

=== Season 1 (2015-16) ===
No. overall	No. in season	Title	Netflix release date	Television air date
Part 1
1	1	"New Boys, New Girls, New City"	September 2, 2015	October 12, 2015
Three new boys (Makoto, Yuki, Uchi) and three new girls (Minori, Mizuki, Yuriko) move in the Terrace House. After introducing themselves to each other, they go grocery shopping and then have their first dinner together in the house.
2	2	"Three Crushes"	September 7, 2015	October 19, 2015
Mizuki cooks dinner for everybody. While having dinner, they plan for Yuki's upcoming birthday party. Afterwards, the girls reveal to themselves that each of them is interested in Makoto.
3	3	"Dream Police"	September 14, 2015	October 26, 2015
Minori and Makoto go on a night jog. At Yuki's birthday party, he starts asking everyone about their future plans. When he's dissatisfied with Mizuki's answer, both Mizuki and Yuriko become upset and start crying.
4	4	"In Tears Again"	September 21, 2015	November 2, 2015
Makoto and Minori go to a yakiniku restaurant; Yuriko and Yuki go out drinking sake together. Makoto reveals to the group that he's afraid he won't make it as a professional baseball player.
5	5	"Eenie Meenie Miney Mo"	October 5, 2015	November 9, 2015
Uchi openly asks all three girls out on separate dates. Makoto goes to Uchi's hair salon to get a haircut. Minori, Makoto, and Yuki go to a fish restaurant where Makoto reveals that Uchi is planning to take Yuriko to the aquarium, just like Yuki's plan.
6	6	"All Screwed Up"	October 12, 2015	November 16, 2015
Uchi and Mizuki go on a date to Leisure Land. At his date with Yuriko, however, the Enoshima aquarium was already closed, so they have a drink instead. The whole group goes to see Yuki tap dance and everybody is very impressed with his performance. Uchi tells Makoto about his nervousness at his date with Yuriko; but behind his back, Makoto tattles about this to Yuriko and makes her feel confused.
7	7	"Showing His True Colors"	October 19, 2015	November 23, 2015
Uchi confronts Makoto about his actions, but Makoto doesn't seem to be remorseful. Uchi goes on a date with Minori, and Yuriko goes to the Sumida aquarium with Yuki. They then plan to go to Blue Note together at some other time. Makoto tells Yuriko that he used to have feelings for Minori, but not any more.
8	8	"Late Night Poolside"	October 26, 2015	November 30, 2015
Makoto sends a text message to Minori, telling her that he still likes her, despite what he said to Yuriko. This makes all three girls to turn against him. The group decides that nobody should sleep in the living room, since it prevents others from using it. Uchi asks Minori out on another date.
9	9	"What a Good Day!"	November 9, 2015	December 7, 2015
Minori has lunch with her sister, Kurumi. Uchi reveals his feelings to Minori, but doesn't expect an immediate answer. Makoto gives Minori a new pair of shoes and they go jogging again. Yuki and Yuriko go to Blue Note, but afterwards she tells him that she wants to reconcile with her ex-boyfriend.
10	10	"Before He Says the Word..."	November 16, 2015	December 14, 2015
Minori makes it clear to Makoto that she doesn't want to go out with him again. Yuriko asks her ex if they can get back together again, but he tells her to concentrate on her exams first. Uchi gives Minori a beauty treatment at his hair salon and she cooks him spaghetti. Makoto decides to leave the house after baseball season is over.
11	11	"Boy from the Rainbow State"	November 23, 2015	January 11, 2016
Both Minori and Uchi work at the GirlsAward fashion show, Minori as a model and Uchi as a hair stylist. The group sees Makoto off and welcomes a new member from Hawaii, Arman. Yuriko tells the group that whatever happens with her and her ex, she plans to leave the house soon.
12	12	"Is She Just Best of Three?"	November 30, 2015	January 18, 2016
Arman applies for a job as an English teacher, then goes to practice kickboxing at Target gym. He also goes on a date with Mizuki to the beach. Uchi tells Minori about his feelings again, but Minori says that she's not ready to make any decision.
13	13	"Who Will Survive?"	December 14, 2015	January 25, 2016
Yuriko's ex makes it clear to her that he doesn't see any future with her. The following morning, she leaves the house. Minori's sister Kurumi comes to drop some relationship advice on Minori and Uchi. A new member joins the group, Arisa from Kagoshima.
14	14	"Ikujinashi"	December 21, 2015	February 1, 2016
Arman is getting close to Arisa and they plan to go to the gym together. Since Minori feels that her relationship with Uchi is going nowhere, she decides to send him a message via omurice. Uchi then tries to prove her wrong. In the process, they officially become a couple.
15	15	"Heating Up for Someone Else"	December 28, 2015	February 8, 2016
Arman goes to a kickboxing training session with Arisa. Before they go hiking on Mount Takao, Arisa prepares a bento to eat at the summit. Mizuki decides to take initiative and asks Arman out for dinner.
16	16	"Magic Spell Costco"	January 4, 2016	February 15, 2016
When Yuki asks Arisa if she wants to go on a day trip with him, she turns him down. At Mizuki's dinner with Arman, he tells her that he has feelings for Arisa. Both Yuki and Mizuki then decide to leave Terrace House.
17	17	"Anywhere for You"	January 11, 2016	February 22, 2016
The group finds a Japanese-style room upstairs and suggests that Minori and Uchi sleep there instead of in the living room. Arman wins his first amateur kickboxing match in Japan. The next day, the group bids farewell to Mizuki and Yuki.
18	18	"Worst Date Ever"	January 25, 2016	February 29, 2016
Minori and Uchi discuss their communication problem. Arman applies for a job at the Kamakura Loco Mart & Garden. He then goes on a date with Arisa to Yomiuriland despite feeling hungover.
Part 2
19	1	"A Christmas Nightmare"	February 8, 2016	April 11, 2016
Arisa tells Arman that she sees him more as a brother than a boyfriend, which upsets him. However, they are able to clear the air afterwards. After Christmas break, Minori and Arman are the only members who are present to welcome new members Hikaru and Natsumi.
20	2	"Scissorhands"	February 15, 2016	April 18, 2016
Both Uchi and Arisa come back from their Christmas holiday and make the group complete again. Minori is annoyed by Nacchan's light teasing of Minori and Uchi's relationship. Hikaru and Arman discuss their situation to avoid treading on each other's toes.
21	3	"Case of Poke Bowl"	February 22, 2016	April 25, 2016
Arman is looking for a way to give Arisa more attention, so Uchi suggests that Arman cook for her. However, Arman prepares the dish together with Nacchan. This causes further misunderstanding between Minori and Nacchan that leads to a house meeting with all six members present.
22	4	"Case of the Meat"	February 29, 2016	May 2, 2016
Minori plans to leave the house when she graduates from college, which is only a couple of weeks away. Uchi is dismayed that the group cooked and ate the hidagyu meat that he got as a present from a highly valued client.
23	5	"No Use Crying over Meat"	March 14, 2016	May 9, 2016
Uchi refuses to talk to anybody and goes to bed directly after work. The only person he is willing to talk to is Kurumi, who happens to be visiting. She mediates between him and Minori, and after a long talk, they finally reconcile. Arman asks Arisa about her feelings toward him, but she uses work as an argument against any relationship.
24	6	"New It-Girl in the City"	March 21, 2016	May 16, 2016
Nacchan and Minori prepare some Valentine's Day cookies for the boys. The group then goes out with Uchi and Minori for the last time before they leave. After a fun day of snowboarding and dinner, they send the couple off in the morning. Misaki Tamori is the next member who arrives. She is an entertainer who dreams of building her own amusement park.
25	7	"Mr. Perfect in the City"	March 28, 2016	May 23, 2016
Han-san, another new arrival, is an architecture student planning to study at Harvard. Misaki, Nacchan, and Arman help him build a table at his studio. Misaki and Hikaru plan to go on a bike ride together.
26	8	"Love Is in the Air"	April 4, 2016	May 30, 2016
While the group is having yakiniku dinner at a restaurant, the conversation turns to Misaki's ex-boyfriend, and Hikaru displays his displeasure at this topic. She thinks his behavior is immature, but changes her mind later when Hikaru apologizes. Arisa asks Han-san's help in designing displays for her hat exhibition.
27	9	"Always Smiling with You"	April 11, 2016	June 6, 2016
Misaki and Hikaru are having so much fun at their bike ride that they already plan for their next date at the hot springs. Nacchan and Han-san find out that they both love fishing, so they plan to do that together. While the group is helping Arisa prepare for her exhibition, she announces that she's leaving the house soon.
28	10	"Cry, Cry, Cry"	April 18, 2016	June 13, 2016
Hikaru is keeping his distance from Misaki, which frustrates her. Han-san changes his mind about going fishing with Nacchan since he has promised to go with his girlfriend instead. For their farewell gift, the group gives Arisa a scrapbook album full of pictures and memories of her stay at the house.
29	11	"Nightie Nightmare"	April 25, 2016	June 20, 2016
The new member who replaces Arisa is Riko, a high school student who just won a national beauty pageant. She goes shopping with Misaki, because Misaki wants to buy a nightgown to impress Hikaru. When she wears the nightgown in front of Hikaru, however, the situation turns awkward. When the group has dinner to welcome Riko, Nacchan's discussion of nightgowns rubs Misaki the wrong way.
30	12	"Girl's Decision in Love"	May 9, 2016	June 27, 2016
Nacchan comes to Han-san's studio and asks him for advice on her situation with Misaki. Han-san tells her that she has to be more considerate with others, especially her housemates. Based on his advice and her conversation with Riko, Nacchan apologizes to Misaki. While on a date in Yokohama, Misaki uses the opportunity to declare her feelings to Hikaru.
31	13	"Natsumi & Fuyumi"	May 23, 2016	July 4, 2016
Misaki and Hikaru's date ends on a sad note as he rejects her. They return to the house very late and the others have been waiting for them. Nacchan gets so worried that she starts drinking while waiting. When Misaki makes a comment about it, Nacchan is irked and worries that the comment would affect her career. Another lengthy house meeting follows, where the matter is resolved. Nevertheless, Nacchan feels that it's time for her to leave the house. At the barbecue party the following night, Hikaru also announces his intention to leave.
32	14	"Shall We Pas de Deux?"	May 30, 2016	July 11, 2016
The barbecue party continues and Misaki shares one last talk with Hikaru. Arman also seems to be quite affected by Hikaru's exit. The group does not have to wait long for new members, as both Momoka and Hayato arrive before long. Momoka is a ballerina and Hayato is a chef-in-training.
33	15	"First Dip in the Pool"	June 6, 2016	July 18, 2016
Hayato cooks hayashi rice for the girls. The next day, he goes on a date with Riko to the meat festival. While the group goes out to a restaurant, Hayato gets emotional when talking about his own dashed dream of becoming an actor. Riko applies for a job at Shibuya 109 but is not confident about her chances. Poolside, the group surprises Momoka with a birthday cake. The boys then go for a swim for the first time in the year.
34	16	"Hamburg × Hamburg"	June 13, 2016	July 25, 2016
Momoka has her first day as a ballet teacher. Riko and Misaki watch Arman carry a mikoshi at the Sanja festival, then the three of them visit Han-san at the café he's been designing. Arman goes on a date with Momoka to the comedy club. The group then support Misaki at her performance with the Ebisu Muscats.
35	17	"Bye Bye Mr. Perfect"	June 27, 2016	August 2, 2016
Hayato goes on another date with Riko, this time to Tsukiji fish market. Han-san's architecture design for building facilities for physically disabled people does not win the competition, but he's happy that the girls visit him at the exhibition. Riko and Misaki congratulates him for a job well done by cooking him a meal. While cleaning the pool, Han-san explains to Misaki and Arman that it's time for him to leave. He is very touched to receive a photo album of his time at the house as a farewell gift.
36	18	"Byrnes Sandwich"	July 4, 2016	August 9, 2016
Shortly after Han-san left, the new member arrives. Yuki Byrnes is a krump dancer who also models. There is immediate attraction between him and Misaki. Despite her ongoing tour with her group, she and Yuki make plans to go out on a dinner.
37	19	"Slow Down Your Love"	July 11, 2016	August 16, 2016
Yuki and Misaki's date goes very well and they have a long talk. Momoka is feeling anxious about an upcoming ballet competition. It's a very important competition, because finishing in the top three would secure her a professional career. She apologizes to Arman for backing out of their date to focus more on training. Riko and Hayato go to the Cup Noodles museum in Yokohama. Afterwards, she has a discussion with the girls about relationships and Riko reveals that she refuses to hold hands with a person who's not her boyfriend.
38	20	"Quick to Say I Love You"	July 18, 2016	August 23, 2016
Because Misaki helps Yuki prepare for an upcoming driver's license test, he promises to take her out with the car when he passes. However, he comes home one night having failed the test. Hayato invites Yuki and Arman to his restaurant after hours and cooks for them. He expresses uncertainty about his relationship with Riko, because they have differing views on their relationship. Momoka finishes sixth at the ballet competition and is quite frustrated at herself. However, she got an offer from a ballet company anyway and starts her professional career in a week. After Misaki's birthday celebration, Yuki tells her that he likes her.
39	21	"Rocket Girl Dives into Love"	August 2, 2016	August 30, 2016
Momoka meets with the artistic director of her new ballet company, and he gives her encouragement for her career. To concentrate on this new task, she tearfully leaves the house. While the group is playing Jenga, a new member named Masako arrives. She calls herself Martha and does modelling while aspiring to be a childcare worker. Although privately she feels drawn to Hayato, she says yes to Arman when he asks her out.
40	22	"Midsummer Intimacy"	August 9, 2016	September 6, 2016
Hayato teaches Martha to cook a pasta dish. He tells her that his relationship with Riko is on hold at the moment and he thinks of her more as a sister. Riko signs a contract with an agency with her mom as her guardian. Riko's mom then surprises everybody by visiting the house. Yuki finally passes his driver's license test and plans a date with Misaki.
41	23	"Better Luck This Time"	August 16, 2016	September 13, 2016
Yuki takes Misaki to Yokohama for the promised date. She wears the white dress that he gave her for her birthday. He repeats his love declaration to her and she accepts. They then come home and announce their relationship to the rest of the group. All six of them go on a camping trip to Nagatoro, Saitama. Arman takes Martha aside and says he wants to get to know her better. Meanwhile, Hayato and Riko have a long conversation that brings them closer again.
42	24	"Fragile Boy, Fragile Girl"	August 23, 2016	September 20, 2016
Martha tearfully confesses to Yuki and Misaki that she is frustrated by Hayato's closeness to Riko. Yuki encourages her to not give up, so she asks Hayato out for a lunch date. At the date, Hayato expresses his discomfort about them going out without telling Riko. They then agree to never go out without involving the whole group. Arman is hit by a car while skateboarding with Yuki. He comes home with bandages but has otherwise no serious injuries. His accident brings him unexpectedly closer to Martha as she tends to his wounds. Riko starts her career of gravure idol with a photoshoot at the house pool. She then goes yukata shopping with Misaki.
43	25	"Kiss and Tell"	September 6, 2016	October 4, 2016
Riko and Hayato both wear yukata for their date at the fireworks festival. Afterwards, they tell the group that nothing special happened at the date. Afterwards, in the dining room, he tells her to concentrate on her career instead of dating him. Meanwhile, Yuki reveals to Misaki that he saw Hayato kissing Riko off-camera before the yukata date. He speculates that they hide their real relationship from the viewers and the other housemates to protect Riko's budding career. Arman also notices that sometimes when he wakes up in the middle of the night, he would see Riko in Hayato's bed. This discrepancy makes them question Riko and Hayato on the status of their relationship.
44	26	"Price of a Lie"	September 13, 2016	October 11, 2016
At the house meeting, Hayato keeps mostly silent and lets Riko explain the situation. She thinks that this is not very manly. She also thinks that he's only using both their careers as a way out. Riko and Hayato separately apologize to Martha for their deception. Martha goes on a date with Arman to the beach. During a boat ride, he asks her to be his girlfriend. She feels some reservation because Arman might be leaving home for Hawaii soon.
45	27	"The Riko Special"	September 20, 2016	October 18, 2016
After Arman explains to Martha that he might stay in Japan if their relationship goes well, she accepts his love declaration. Hayato gets some relationship advice from his boss at the restaurant. This makes him decide to win Riko back. Riko is going back to her hometown for five days for a job, but Hayato asks her to come to the restaurant right afterwards because he's making a special dessert for her. Arman says goodbye to his colleagues at Kamakura Loco Mart and they thank him for being a hard worker.
46	28	"Bye Bye Terrace House in the City"	September 27, 2016	October 25, 2016
While the rest of the group is celebrating Martha's birthday, Hayato waits anxiously at his restaurant for Riko's arrival. However, Riko goes straight from the train station back to Terrace House. Han-san and Nacchan drop by for a surprise visit. The group spends time together for the last time, cleaning the house, packing their belongings, swimming in the pool, and having a barbecue party. The show then ends with a teaser for the next iteration of the Terrace House franchise: Aloha State.
