= Triendl =

Triendl is a German surname. Notable people with the surname include:

- Katrin Triendl (born 1987), Austrian alpine skier
- Reina Triendl (born 1992), Japanese fashion model, tarento, and actress
