= Yūki Yamamoto =

Yūki Yamamoto, Yuki Yamamoto or Yuuki Yamamoto may refer to:

- Yuki Yamamoto (footballer) (山本 悠樹, born 1997), Japanese footballer
- Yuuki Yamamoto (model) (山本 優希, born 1987), Japanese fashion model
