= Terrace House: Closing Door =

- Poster, featuring Tetsuya Sugaya
- テラスハウス クロージング・ドア
- Directed by: Masato Maeda
- Production companies: Fuji Television, East Entertainment
- Distributed by: Toho
- Release date: February 14, 2015
- Running time: 128 minutes
- Country: Japan
- Language: Japanese
- Box office: ¥1.3 billion

Terrace House: Closing Door (Japanese: テラスハウス クロージング・ドア, Hepburn: Terasu Hausu Kurōjingu Doa) is a 2015 Japanese reality show theatrical film that acts as a continuation and ending to the Fuji Television show Terrace House: Boys × Girls Next Door. It was released by Toho on February 14, 2015. Tetsuya Sugaya and Seina Shimabukuro continue as residents from the show, with four new members joining them. One of whom is writing a book on Terrace House and briefly interviews previous members. Studio commentators You, Reina Triendl, Yoshimi Tokui, Azusa Babazono, Ryota Yamasato and Hiroomi Tosaka also return.

Closing Door is the last installment in the Terrace House franchise before Netflix became a co-producer later in the year with Terrace House: Boys & Girls in the City.

== Plot summary ==
Picking up immediately from the final episode of Terrace House: Boys × Girls Next Door, Tetsuya Sugaya opens the door to move out of the house and sees Yuiko Matsukawa, who introduces herself and says she will be living there from today onward. Informing him that Terrace House is not over yet and is being turned into a movie, Yuiko convinces Tetsuya to stay a little longer. The next day Maya Izumi, a fashion design student, Jin Otabe, an editor for Quick Japan, and Keisuke Yoshino, a basketball coach, move in. Seina Shimabukuro tells her boyfriend and fellow former cast member Daiki Ito that she wants to move back into the house, and although he says he will be jealous she is living with other guys, he accepts her decision.

Jin plans to write a book on Terrace House and interviews previous former house members at various points throughout the film. First he visits Michiko Yamanaka at an exhibition for her bikini line, where he interviews her and her boyfriend Kenya Yasuda. He later interviews Chie Onuki, Masato Yukawa, who has become president of the clothing brand Alive, and Momoko Takeuchi, who has published a book. He also sees a comedy show by Ippei Shima.

Jin asks Yuiko out to eat, where they talk about what kind of guys she likes. Tetsuya also asks to meet up with Yuiko, where she feeds him. Former member Yosuke Imai visits the house and flirts with Maya, who flirts back. Tetsuya offers Yosuke the chance to stay in his place while he is away working in Bangladesh for two weeks. Tetsuya meets up with Hana Imai and Miwako Kakei to get advice on how to proceed with Yuiko. However, Yuiko reveals to Maya that she heard rumors that Tetsuya goes to hostess clubs, so her feelings have cooled off.

After he moves in, Maya asks Yosuke to take her with him on a photography trip to the ocean. Yosuke meets up with Dyki Miyagi, who got a main character acting role, and Masato Yukawa to tell them about Maya. Jin asks Yuiko out again, but she declines, before accepting when he tries again the following day. Yosuke and Maya go out to eat, and later hold hands on the beach. The day he moves out, Yosuke plays Maya a song he wrote for her. When Tetsuya returns, he asks Yuiko out, but she declines and explains it is because of his visits to hostess clubs. He later explains his actions and gives her time to reconsider. When Yuiko later accepts a date offer from Jin in front of Tetsuya, Tetsuya asks if she has reconsidered, and she agrees to go out with him again.

Tetsuya takes Yuiko to the beach and to eat ramen. She later admits to Maya that it was fun, but she was expecting a proper date and the beach ruined her new heels. Yuiko informs Jin that she is interested in going out again with Tetsuya, and therefore is not romantically interested in him. Masato goes surfing with Tetsuya with Seina tagging along to watch, after which Tetsuya says he wants to go on one last date with Yuiko as Terrace House is ending. Maya visits Yosuke at his photo exhibit before going to dinner where she tells him that while she has special feelings for him, she can not see him as a boyfriend because he was married before and has a child, which he accepts. Seina and Daiki go to dinner and then to the beach where they became a couple, which he lit with candles. There he gives her a necklace and asks her to marry him once he graduates and becomes successful, to which she says she will wait. Tetsuya takes Yuiko on a boat trip and to dinner at a fancy restaurant, where he gives her flowers and gloves. Afterwards, he confesses his love, but Yuiko tells him that she can only see Tetsuya as a boy and not a man.

Tetsuya surprises everyone by getting a buzz cut in the style he first arrived at the house with two years earlier. All the members move out of Terrace House, with Tetsuya the last to leave.

== Cast ==
Name		Occupation	Date of birth
English	Japanese	Occupation	Date of birth
Tetsuya Sugaya	菅谷哲也	aspiring actor	July 28, 1993
Yuiko Matsukawa	松川佑依子	office worker, gravure idol	May 6, 1990
Maya Izumi	和泉真弥	aspiring designer	September 17, 1994
Jin Otabe	小田部仁	magazine editor	November 20, 1989
Keisuke Yoshino	吉野圭佑	basketball coach	June 18, 1995
Seina Shimabukuro	島袋聖南	aspiring model	April 4, 1987

== Soundtrack ==
The soundtrack to the film was released on February 11, 2015, by Universal Music. It reached number 34 on the Oricon Albums Chart.

Terrace House Tunes Closing Door
No.	Title	Artist	Length
1.	"We Are Never Ever Getting Back Together"	Taylor Swift
2.	"I Bet My Life"	Imagine Dragons
3.	"Geronimo"	Sheppard
4.	"Dream"	Priscilla Ahn
5.	"The Days"	Avicii
6.	"Ten Feet Tall (feat. Wrabel)"	Afrojack
7.	"It Don't Matter"	Donavon Frankenreiter
8.	"Lost in You"	Dirty Loops
9.	"Cleopatra"	Weezer
10.	"Seven Nights Seven Days"	The Fratellis
11.	"Santeria"	Sublime
12.	"Demise"	Wouter Hamel
13.	"Happy Christmas"	Colbie Caillat
14.	"Chasing Cars"	Snow Patrol

== Reception ==
Terrace House: Closing Door opened at number one at the Japanese box office, grossing ¥251 million (about US$2.11 million) in two days. Terrace House: Closing Door weekend advanced online ticket sales however fell by 52% from the previous weekend (160,000 ticket), to disappoint 46,800 ticket in its second weekend and losing number one to American Sniper. It later made ¥1.3 billion (about US$11.7 million) total.
