= Ayu no Deji Deji Nikki =

2009 photobook by Ayumi Hamasaki

- Cover of Hamasaki's photobook
- Author: Ayumi Hamasaki
- Language: Japanese
- Genre: Diary
- Publisher: Nippon IPS
- Publication date: 2009
- Publication place: Japan
- Media type: Photobook
- Pages: 168 pp

Deji Deji Nikki 100 Kai Kinen! Ayumi Hamasaki Bon or Ayu no Deji Deji Nikki is a photobook by Japanese pop singer Ayumi Hamasaki. It was released on 7 April 2009. It includes Hamasaki's diary entries from ViVi magazine that she kept from 2001 until 2009. It also includes an interview and photos of her in a white bikini on a beach. The photobook is the first of its kind debut at Number 1 on the Oricon Book Charts with well over 100,000 copies sold.
