= Terrace House =

Japanese reality television show franchise

- Genre: Reality
- Presented by: You; Reina Triendl; Yoshimi Tokui; Azusa Babazono; Ryota Yamasato; Hiroomi Tosaka; Ayumu Mochizuki; Kentaro; Shono Hayama
- Country of origin: Japan
- Original language: Japanese

Production
- Producers: Dai Ota; Sayaka Matsumoto
- Running time: Varies
- Production companies: Fuji Television (2012–2020); Netflix (2015–2020)

Original release
- Network: Fuji Television, Netflix
- Release: October 12, 2012 – May 19, 2020

Terrace House (Japanese: テラスハウス, Hepburn: Terasu Hausu) is a Japanese reality television show franchise consisting of five series and one theatrical film. The show follows the lives of six strangers, three men and three women from different walks of life, who live under the same roof while getting to know and date each other. The show has received positive reviews for its earnest take on the reality TV format. Since releasing internationally the show has become a global sleeper hit and developed a cult following.

The first series, subtitled Boys × Girls Next Door, originally aired on Fuji Television's "Cool TV" segment from October 12, 2012, to September 29, 2014, after which the 2015 standalone film Closing Door was released as a conclusion to the show. Subsequent series were produced as Fuji TV and Netflix co-productions, internationally premiering as a Netflix Original while also airing on Fuji Television within Japan. The second series, subtitled Boys & Girls in the City, aired from September 2, 2015, to September 27, 2016, and moved the setting from the Shōnan area to central Tokyo. For the third series the show moved from Japan to Hawaii, airing from November 1, 2016, to August 29, 2017, under the subtitle Aloha State. The fourth series, subtitled as Opening New Doors, moved the show back to Japan in Nagano prefecture and aired from December 19, 2017, to February 12, 2019. The fifth and most recent series, Tokyo 2019–2020, began airing on May 14, 2019, and aired its last episode on May 19, 2020, when it was cancelled following the suicide of cast member Hana Kimura.

== Overview ==
Terrace House is a reality television show that follows six strangers who move in together as they build friendships and relationships. The group is composed of three women and three men aged from their teens to their 30s. While not explicitly described as a dating show, Terrace House has been labeled as such by several reviewers. Viewing drama comes from watching members pursue romance and deal with the differences in their personalities, morals, hopes, and dreams.

The show provides access to a furnished house and two cars, all of which are equipped with cameras, in a fly on the wall style. While in Terrace House, members keep their day jobs and are allowed to go about their daily lives as they please. Occasionally, the cameras will also provide insight into the members' personal lives, their workplace, friends, and family, but heavily focuses on capturing dates between housemates and meaningful group events. Should one of the housemates decide to permanently leave the show, a new member of the same gender is invited to join upon the previous housemate's departure.

A group of studio commentators introduce each episode and watch along with the viewer, providing real-time commentary. At regular intervals, the show cuts to the panel as they analyze conversations, decipher members' body language, and joke about the last 10 minutes of footage.

=== Controversy ===
In a December 2017 interview with Metropolis, former Aloha State castmate Lauren Tsai referred to Terrace House as "probably the least real reality show." She claimed that the film crew only showed up a few hours a day (and not even every day) or when there was a notable excursion, like a date or group outing, and that the housemates were told not to talk for the remaining 20 or so hours of the day. Although confirming it is unscripted, Tsai said the crew told them in general what topics to talk about and through editing told a story; "they don't tell us exactly what to say, but they know what kind of story they want to edit in their minds, so they force the content to be created." Metropolis later deleted these parts of the online article.

Following the death of Hana Kimura in May 2020, The New York Times reported that all Terrace House cast members sign non-disclosure agreements barring them from talking about what happens behind the scenes. Three former housemates interviewed by the Times alleged staff manipulation of events. However, at least two others said they never received any specific instructions, with one explaining that the cast members themselves would often behave differently for the cameras. Hana's mother, Kyoko Kimura, alleged that Terrace House producers pressured her daughter to act violently on camera. The Japan Times reported that Fuji TV admitted that cast members sign an agreement with a provision in which they "have to agree to all instructions and decisions regarding scheduling and the way the scenes are shot," including how these are edited afterward, but that there was "no coercion" and the producers did not give any instructions to cast members that would have "manipulated them emotionally." They also said that the production team "did not demand the cast fully comply with all of its instructions," but if a cast member was found to violate the terms of the agreement and affect production of the show, they would have to pay for damages incurred.

== Studio commentators ==
Presenter	Boys × Girls Next Door	Boys & Girls in the City	Aloha State	Opening New Doors	Tokyo 2019–2020
You	Ep 1–98	Ep 1–46	Ep 1–36	Ep 1–49	Ep 1–40
Reina Triendl	Ep 14–98	Ep 1–46	Ep 1–36	Ep 1–49	Ep 1–40, 43–44
Yoshimi Tokui	Ep 26–98	Ep 1–46	Ep 1–36	Ep 1–49	Ep 1–24
Azusa Babazono	Ep 26–98	Ep 1–46	Ep 1–36	Ep 1–49	Ep 1–40
Ryota Yamasato	Ep 26–98	Ep 1–46	Ep 1–36	Ep 1–49	Ep 1–44
Hiroomi Tosaka	Ep 26–98				
Ayumu Mochizuki		Ep 1–18			
Kentaro		Ep 19–46	Ep 1–36		
Shono Hayama				Ep 1–49	Ep 1–40

=== Guest commentators ===
Presenter	Boys × Girls Next Door	Boys & Girls in the City	Aloha State	Opening New Doors	Tokyo 2019–2020
Hanamaru Hakata	Ep 89, 95–96				
Tsukasa Saito			Ep 10–11, 14–17		
Kenta Maeda				Ep 45	
Rui Hachimura					Ep 13–14
Yu Tamura					Ep 25–26
Chiemi Buruzon					Ep 29–30
Eiichiro Funakoshi					Ep 31–32
Mei Nagano					Ep 33–36
Asami Mizukawa					Ep 39–40

== Reception ==
=== Critical reception ===
Terrace House received praise for bringing reality back to reality television, with the lack of drama making the show distinctive, relaxing, and addictive. GQ magazine described the show as "the reality show for people who hate reality shows," adding it will take over your life as you become heavily invested in minute happenings.

Troy Patterson of the New Yorker praised the slow-burning action which is "sparked by the honest friction of minor personality flaws and conflicting personal needs," commenting that the show is closer to a nature documentary than to the exploitation films that people now expect from reality television: "If the producers massage their interactions with an eye toward creating conflict, they do so with the subtlest hand the genre has ever seen." In Justin McElroy's review for Polygon, he lauded the show as infinitely fascinating: "In a reality TV landscape cluttered by fame-hungry pseudo-human caricatures, Terrace House stands alone by simply letting actual humans be delightfully, heartbreakingly human." Andrew Ridker, writing for The New York Times Magazine, described the show as staggeringly banal yet capable of genuine literary excellence. On the compelling nature of the housemates Ridker stated, "I found myself identifying with the housemates in a powerful way. Their lives are just so real."

In The Guardian's review titled "Terrace House: the must-watch Japanese reality show in which nothing happens", Rachel Aroesti describes the show as a sleeper hit and attributed its success to the comforting viewing experience, describing it as meditative in nature. Aroesti described the show as an example of truth being more compelling than fiction, "For everybody who has been consistently disappointed with the gulf between the principles of reality TV and the actual reality, Terrace House might be the genre’s saving grace." Writing for BBC News, Yvette Tan suggests the success of Terrace House is due to its mutedness: "It's quiet and calm on the eyes. It's got soothing colours, the people are nice and speak in more muted tones." Tan suggests this contrast against other "neon" reality TV, which shouts for attention with bright colours and loud contestants, is part of Terrace House's appeal as a reality TV antidote.

Terrace House's studio commentators have been cited as a highlight of the show and for setting it apart from other reality TV series. Reviewers also note how they provide international viewers with context on Japanese cultural nuances. Lindsey Weber of Elle wrote that "by watching 'with' you and reacting alongside, the gang amplifies the awkward, funny, and (their description, not mine) utterly Japanese moments" and proves that every reality show should have a panel of commentators. The Ringer's Nicole Bae noted that the commentators also "provide a level of consistency to anchor the show. For a series as staid as Terrace House, the hosts offer a dose of wit to keep the proceedings lively."

The show was described by Clio Chang in Esquire as "the perfect show to watch with your mum" due to its PG approach to dating. Chang comments the shows tensions ultimately revolve around small differences in each character’s personality and morals, which makes Terrace House "just the right level of drama to dissect with your mother after dinner."

On the success of Terrace House's seemingly drama free approach to reality TV, Dr Griseldis Kirsch, senior lecturer in contemporary Japanese culture at the School of Oriental and African Studies commented "I think one reason why the show might be so appealing is that we're able to relate more to the people in the show. You're able to imagine yourself in their shoes."

Judy Berman of Time listed Terrace House: Opening New Doors at number six on a list of the best TV shows of 2018.

=== Ratings ===
During the initial run of Boys × Girls Next Door on Fuji Television audience share increased from an average of 5.5% at the start of the series to 6.9% at the end. Episode 74 had the highest viewing figures with an audience share of 9.1%. While Netflix does not publicly release its viewer data, Netflix Japan content manager Kaata Sakamoto told Buzzfeed News the show had exceeded their expectations in terms of international viewership.

== Explanatory notes ==
1. The studio commentator lineup for Tokyo 2019–2020 went through changes during the season. In October 2019, Yoshimi Tokui took a break from entertainment after it was revealed he neglected to pay appropriate taxes for three consecutive years. In April 2020, the show temporarily stopped production due to the COVID-19 pandemic in Japan, then resumed airing episodes in May 2020 with Ryota Yamasato and Reina Triendl hosting the commentary segments. The remainder of the season was canceled following the death of cast member Hana Kimura.
