= Yama-chan =

Yama-chan is a nickname that may refer to:

- Kōichi Yamadera (born 1961), Japanese actor
- Ryota Yamasato (born 1977), Japanese comedian
