= Mai Miyagi =

Japanese fashion model and tarento (born 1988)

- 宮城 舞
- Born: 19 February 1988 (age 38); Kanagawa Prefecture, Japan
- Other name: Maipū
- Occupations: Model; tarento; actress
- Children: 2
- Modeling information
- Height: 160 cm (5 ft 3 in) (2014)

Mai Miyagi (宮城 舞, Miyagi Mai; born 19 February 1988, in Yokohama, Kanagawa Prefecture) is a Japanese fashion model and tarento. She is represented with Starray Production. Her activities centred on magazines and runways. She has the nickname "Maipū" (まいぷぅ).

After debuting at the gyaru magazine Ranzuki, since 2008 she has been acting as an exclusive model of Jelly for about five years. After becoming an existence called by a signboard model of the same magazine, she moved to ViVi from 2013.

== Biography ==
=== Modelling career ===
She was posted as a reader model in the magazine Ranzuki on the occasion of the scouting received before 109 in high school and became the main model of the magazine, then it will become an exclusive model of Jelly from 2008. Since then, she continued exclusive model activities of the magazine. She was posted on the cover on its first solo in the December issue of the same year in her seventh year of the model in 2011. She was later posted on the cover on its own in the next issues of March and April 2012, and February 2013.

She graduated from Jelly who carried out exclusive model activities for about five years at the April issue released in February 2013. On the same day, on 22nd of her own blog, she announced that it will act as a ViVi exclusive model from the April issue of ViVi released on 23 February, and appeared on "ViVi Night" held in Nagoya the same day. The transfer drama of electric shock in this one week became a hot topic on the internet, and was posted as Exceptional Transfer to Jelly Model ViVi at Yahoo News.

In 2013, which became an exclusive model of ViVi, she showed her first gravure modelling with Young Magazine (No. 40) released in September. She made her initial appearance to "Tokyo Runway" in 2014. In addition, she performed various runway performances such as "Tokyo Girls Collection" and "Girls Award", and changed her hairstyle, also became the year when it was said that it was "a year of Imechen".

In 2015, she was appointed in the fashion brand "Heather" developed by Adastria, and became the first "Communication Director" of the brand. She was later appointed after receiving support from a female college student who is the main target of this brand, and will be involved in product development advice, season campaign planning, brand image construction, novelty creation, etc.

She appeared in AbemaTV's Freestyle Jan Jon Rec 2 uploaded on 3 September 2016, and won the pro-opponent and earned a prize of 1.5 million yen.

=== Acting career ===
In addition to her model activities, in 2011, she appeared in the stage drama Yakusanjū no Uso written by Hideo Tsuchida, becoming her first activity as an actress. In 2014, she played with her younger brother Dyki Miyagi on the stage play "I Want to Try Again xx!" of directed by co-star Chuji Mikasano.

== Filmography ==
=== Magazines ===
Title	Publisher
ViVi	Kodansha
Jelly	Bunkasha
Ranzuki	Bunkasha

=== Runways ===
Title
Tokyo Girls Collection
Girls Award
Tokyo Runway

=== Music videos ===
Artist	Song
C&K	"Dance Man (Wokky Wokky × Boggie Woggie)"
Lady Bird feat. yula.	"Tokyo wa Yoru no Shichiji"

=== Jacket photos ===
Year	Title	Artist	Notes	Ref.
2010	"Tokyo wa Yoru no Shichiji"	Lady Bird feat. yula.	With Yuuki Yamamoto and Maya Mori	
2011	Shibuya Ragga Sweet Collection	Spicy Chocolate		
2012	Shibuya Ragga Sweet Collection 2	Spicy Chocolate		

=== Catalogues ===
Year	Title	With	Ref.
2013	Sly 2013 Spring News Paper	Aki Matsummoto	
2013	Sly 2013 Autumn News Paper	Tina Tamashiro	
2014	Sly 2014 Spring News Paper	Tina Tamashiro	

=== Television ===
Dates	Title	Network	Notes
12 Jun 2013	Tokyo Precious Dating	EX	#58 Kyobashi
5 Sep 2015	NMB48 Ririka Suto no Kamigi Toi Gachi Battle	TBS Channel	
	Terrace House: Boys × Girls Next Door	CX	
4 Dec 2016 –	Summers no Kamigi Toi	CX	As 47 prefectural surname survey respondent
26 May 2017	The Warame De Pon	Fuji TV One	

=== Others ===
Medium	Year	Title	With	Notes	Ref.
Book	2010	Gilfy Store Produced by Jelly	Maiko Takahashi, Maya Mori, Yuuki Yamamoto, Naomi Arai, Mana Honda	Published by Bunkasha	
Internet programme		Gyaru Tele	Yuuki Yamamoto, Yui Minemura	Uploaded to YouTube; regular	
Radio programme		Mai Miyagi no Say Love		Aired on Tokyo FM	

== Personal life ==
Mai Miyagi has a close relationship with her younger brother, actor and former kickboxer Daiki Miyagi (also known as Dyki Miyagi), who appeared on Terrace House: Boys × Girls Next Door. The siblings have worked together on stage plays and runway shows. Their bond is such that they are often mistaken for a romantic couple. During a joint appearance at the opening event of the recycle shop "Jumble Store Shibuya Honten" in December 2014, Mai Miyagi recalled that when they walk together in their hometown, her brother's friends have asked him, "You were with a girl yesterday, weren't you?" Daiki confirmed that he has to respond, "That's my older sister!" Mai also noted that they have been told to "act like a couple" during work assignments, adding, "I wonder if they realize we're siblings."
