= Miwako Kakei =

Japanese actress (born 1994)

- 筧 美和子
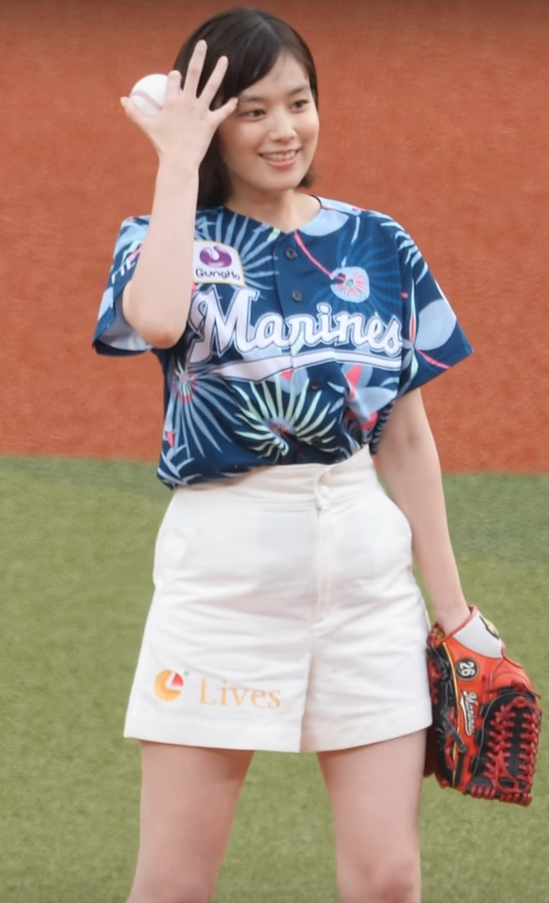
- Kakei in September 2018
- Born: 6 March 1994 (age 32); Tokyo, Japan
- Other name: Mīko (みーこ)
- Occupations: Model; actress; variety tarento
- Years active: 2012–present
- Agent: Sui
- Style: General modelling; swimsuit gravure
- Height: 164 cm (5 ft 5 in)
- Spouse: Unknown (m. 2025)
- Children: 1

Miwako Kakei (筧 美和子, Kakei Miwako; born 6 March 1994) is a Japanese actress, model and variety tarento. Kakei is belongs to her private office, Sui (with Platinum Production as her business partnership) and is an exclusive model for JJ.

== Biography ==
Miwako Kakei was born on 6 March 1994 in Tokyo. Her great-grandmother was Russian. Before her chance to debut, Kakei was in high school in 2011, and was later scouted by her friend from a fashion show. In May 2013, she joined the cast of the reality series Terrace House: Boys × Girls Next Door and later briefly appeared in the 2015 film Terrace House: Closing Door. On 14 September 2013, Kakei was selected in the semi-Grand Prix at the One Life Model audition. Later on 23 September, she started the baseball ceremony at the final round of the Hokkaido Nippon-Ham Fighters' baseball game. In 5 October, Kakei got 68,322 points by public viewing from the viewers, and was selected as the Thursday reporter of "Coco-chō" of Mezamashi TV. Later on 19 December, her first official book Mīko Miwako Kakei 1st Official Book was published.

On 4 April 2014, her photo collection Venus Tanjō by Kishin Shinoyama was released. (Note: Shinoyama, who looked back at the time of shooting Venus Tanjō, said, "She was dignified since her first meeting. Even if it was sparkling, I did not make it chara chara.")

On 3 March 2025, Kakei announced on her Instagram that she was married to a general man.

On 5 January 2026, she announced on Instagram that she has established her own agency named "sui," and will be entering into a business partnership with Platinum Production, the company she was previously represents with.

On 1 February 2026, Kakei announced her pregnancy of her first child. On 1 June, she gave birth to her first child, a baby boy.

== Filmography ==
=== Film ===
Year	Title	Role	Notes	Ref.
2015	Kamen Rider Drive: Surprise Future	Mirai Hanasaki		
2016	Summer Song	Tsugumi		
2016	Ushijima the Loan Shark Part 3	Hanahasu		
2018	Thicker Than Water			
2018	Stolen Identity			
2020	Food Luck	Ryoko Matoba		
2021	Back to That Day			
2021	Last of the Wolves	Chiaki Kanbara		
2022	The Mukoda Barber Shop	Sanae Mihashi		
2023	The Quiet Yakuza Part 1	Akemi Akino		
2023	Zom 100: Bucket List of the Dead	Maki		
2023	The Quiet Yakuza Part 2	Akemi Akino		
2024	Take Me to Another Planet	Glico		
2024	The Scoop	Yamauchi		
2024	The Quiet Yakuza 2: Part 1	Akemi Akino		
2024	The Quiet Yakuza 2: Part 2	Akemi Akino		
2024	Trauma			
2025	Hometown Homework	Ami Igarashi	Lead role	

=== Television drama ===
Year	Title	Role	Notes	Ref.
2014	Water Polo Yankees	Ryoko Maeda		
2014	Kurofuku Monogatari	Mao		
2015	Mare	Michiko Furukawa	Asadora	
2015	Transit Girls			
2015	Hashire! Sayuri-chan	Rena Takefuji		
2016	OL desuga, Caba Jō hajimemashita	Kazumi		
2016	Crazy	Hikiko Yuki	Lead role	
2018	Miss Devil	Karen Nakayama	Episode 4	
2019	Your Turn to Kill	Ruri Sakuragi		
2021	Komi Can't Communicate	Shibuki Ase		
2022	One Night Morning	Mitsushima	Lead role; episode 8	
2022	Kamen Rider Black Sun	Anemone Kaijin		
2024	Mentsuyu Hitori Meshi	Sōko Mendō	Season 2	

=== Other television ===
Year	Title	Notes	Ref.
2013	Terrace House: Boys × Girls Next Door		
2015	Tsugi Naru TV	As a host	

== Bibliography ==
=== Photo albums ===
Year	Title	Book code	Ref.
2013	Mīko Miwako Kakei 1st Official Book	ISBN 978-4047293694	
2014	Venus Tanjō	ISBN 978-4344025592	
2016	Me	ISBN 978-4334842857	
2016	Parallel	ISBN 978-4334842864	
2024	Go Me	ISBN 978-4087901580	
