= Malia (model) =

Japanese fashion model (born 1983)

- Born: 1 February 1983 (age 43); Yokohama, Kanagawa Prefecture, Japan
- Other names: Māchan (まーちゃん)
- Occupations: Model; tarento
- Style: General fashion
- Height: 167 cm (5 ft 6 in)

Malia (stylized as MALIA, born 1 February 1983, in Kōhoku-ku, Yokohama, Kanagawa Prefecture) is a Japanese fashion model. Her real name is Maria Shinbo (新保 真里有, Shinbo Maria). She is represented by Ten Carat.

== Filmography ==
=== Magazines ===
Title	Publisher
Vivi	Kodansha
SAKURA	Shogakukan
Frau	Kodansha
Boao	Magazine House
Bijin Hyaku Hana	Kadokawa Haruki Corporation
smart	Takarajimasha

=== Advertising ===
Title	Notes
Kitson×Uniqlo Super Mama by Leslie Kee	Charity album
Inter Planet	Image model
duras ambient	Image model
HbG	Image model
Uniqlo	Image model
Moussy	Image model
Lagunamoon	Image model

=== TV programmes ===
Year	Title	Network
2009	easy sports	TV Asahi
	Meringue no Kimochi	NTV
	The! Sekai Gyōten News	NTV
2010	Ichihachi	TBS
	Gokujō Jikara Premium	TV Tokyo
2015	Konya kurabete mimashita	NTV

=== TV dramas ===
Year	Title	Role	Network
2015	The Last Cop	Rei Kirishima	NTV

== Bibliography ==
Year	Title	Book code
2009	Gekkan Malia	ISBN 978-4-10-790210-8
