= Rina Sumioka =

Japanese female singer-songwriter (born 1990)

Rina Sumioka 住岡 梨奈
- Born: February 15, 1990 (age 36); Noboribetsu, Hokkaido, Japan
- Genre: J-Pop
- Occupation: singer-songwriter
- Instruments: vocals, acoustic guitar
- Years active: 2011-present
- Labels: Ki/oon (2011-2017); Tokuma Japan Communications (2017-present)
- Website: Sumioka Rina Official Website

Rina Sumioka (住岡 梨奈, Sumioka Rina; born 15 February 1990) is a Japanese female singer-songwriter.

== Background ==
Sumioka was born in Noboribetsu city in the Hokkaido prefecture.

Just before graduating from high school, her juniors invited her to join a band as their vocalist. Since then she started composing songs with her father's acoustic guitar and writing lyrics herself.

During her university years, she was very active in her school's music club. She even became the head of the music club in her third year. She graduated from the Faculty of Environmental System Sciences of Rakuno Gakuen University in March 2012.

== Career ==
When Sumioka was playing her first live performance at a live house in 2009, she was scouted by some staff from Sony Music.

She debuted with the single "feel you" on June 20, 2012 under the Ki/oon music label.

She joined Fuji Television's reality show Terrace House: Boys × Girls Next Door as a regular cast member from July 12, 2013 to January 27, 2014, which greatly increased her popularity.

== Discography ==
=== Singles ===
- Nagareboshi (2009) - pre-debut, indies era
- feel you (June 20, 2012)
- Harenohi (January 30, 2013)
- Hello Yellow! / Nagareboshi (October 23, 2013)
- Kotoba ni Shitainda (February 26, 2014)
- flavor (May 28, 2014)
- My Friend / Bokura no Ayumu Michi (September 17, 2014)
- Large & Small GIFT (February 11, 2015)

=== Albums ===
- Tsumugi Uta (November 27, 2013)
- watchword (November 12, 2014)
- Moment (April 27, 2016) - Mini Album
- Kokoro ga Kimi wo Utatteru (December 7, 2016)
- colors (August 23, 2017) - Double Mini Album

== Filmography ==
=== Film ===
Year	Title	Role	Notes	Ref
2018	Amanogawa	Kana Shiratori	Part-time worker at a pension guest house in Yakushima	
