= You (actress) =

Japanese actress and television personality (born 1964)

- ゆう
- Born: Yukiko Ehara; August 29, 1964 (age 62); Koganei, Tokyo, Japan
- Occupations: Actress; television personality
- Years active: 1985–present
- Spouses: Minoru Tezuka (m. 1991; div. 1997); Shunsuke Matsuoka (m. 1997; div. 2005)
- Children: 1

Yukiko Ehara (Japanese: 江原由希子, Hepburn: Ehara Yukiko; born August 29, 1964), also known as You (ゆう, Yū), is a Japanese television personality and actress, and former singer and model.

== Career ==
Ehara was scouted in Harajuku and began working as a model. She began a career as a singer under her birth name, releasing her first single "Chotto Dake" in 1985. In 1988, she was invited by Shi-Shonen bassist Seiji Toda to form their own band called Fairchild. Taking on the stage name You, she served as vocalist and songwriter. In 1990, You secured a regular spot on the comedy duo Downtown's weekly Thursday night radio show MBS Youngtown. She next accepted a regular role on Downtown's television show Downtown no Gottsu Ee Kanji. With the shift in her career focus from singing to television, the band Fairchild broke up in 1993.

While continuing as a regular on various television and radio shows, she has authored two books, appeared in a number of films, and is a regular contributor (and occasional cover girl) for the fashion magazine In Red. She was nominated for the Best Supporting Actress award at the 2005 Japanese Academy Awards for her performance as the absent mother in Nobody Knows. You has been a studio commentator for the reality television series Terrace House since its inception in 2012.

Since October 2016, You and her fellow Terrace House commentator Ryota Yamasato have co-hosted the puppet show Nehorin Pahorin on NHK Educational TV. They each voice mole puppets who co-interview the non-famous guest represented by a pig puppet. The anonymity afforded via the puppets and voice modulation allows the guests to talk candidly about topics not usually covered on mainstream TV, such as idol otaku or host club addiction.

You recently featured in the French-Japanese film Umami, directed by Slony Sow, and starring Gérard Depardieu, production of which took place in Hokkaido, Japan and Saumur, France.

== Personal life ==
You was married to Minoru Tezuka, guitarist of the rock band The Privates, from 1991 until getting divorced in January 1997. That same year, she married actor Shunsuke Matsuoka in July and gave birth to their son in November. You and Matsuoka divorced in 2005.

== Selected filmography ==
=== Television ===
- Ganbare, Kickers! (1986), Akina Uesugi
- Downtown no Gottsu Ee Kanji (1991–1997)
- Kisarazu Cat's Eye (2002)
- Manhattan Love Story (2003)
- Oh! My Girl!! (2008)
- Midnight Diner(2009), Michiko Kazami
- Second Virgin (2010), Akiko
- Hakken! Gyōten!! Puremia Mon!!! Doyō wa Dameyo! (2013–present)
- Going My Home (2012), Takiko Ito
- Terrace House: Boys × Girls Next Door (2012–2014)
- Terrace House: Boys & Girls in the City (2015–2016)
- EXD44 (2016–present)
- Nehorin Pahorin (2016–present)
- Terrace House: Aloha State (2016–2017)
- 7Rules (2017–present)
- Terrace House: Opening New Doors (2017–2019)
- Terrace House: Tokyo 2019–2020 (2019–2020)
- The Way of the Househusband (2020), Miku's Mother
- Come Come Everybody (2021), Midori Kijima
- Sunny (2024) Hime
- Glass Heart (2025), Momoko Saijo

=== Film ===
- Nobody Knows (2004), Keiko Fukushima
- Be with You (2004), Yuji's teacher
- The Uchōten Hotel (2006), Sakura Cherry
- GeGeGe no Kitarō (2007), Rokurokubi
- Still Walking (2008), Chinami Kataoka
- Boys on the Run (2010), Shiho
- Friends: Mononoke Shima no Naki (2011), Mikke
- R100 (2013), Setsuko Katayama
- Terrace House: Closing Door (2015)
- Her Sketchbook (2017), Mika Konuma
- You, Your, Yours (2018), Hoshino
- Umami (2022), Noriko
- Mom, Is That You?! (2023), Kotoko Andersson
- 1st Kiss (2025)
- Fujiko (2026)
- Trophy (2026)
- Ha-Chan, Shake Your Booty! (2026), Hiromi

== Discography ==
=== Albums ===
- Birthday (1985)
- Otokotachi ni wa Wakaranai (男達には判らない; 1986)
- Cachemire (1994)
- Minami-muki (南向き; 1996)

== Bibliography ==
- Umu Onna (産む女; 1998)
- You no Korekara Korekara (YOUのこれからこれから; 2003)
- Toriaezu Ikkai Neru. (とりあえず一回ねる。; 2007)
- Uchi ni Mo o Mie ni Narimashita (うちにもおみえになりました; 2008)
- Shimai Dokoro Iroiro (しまいどころいろいろ; 2010)
- You no Korekara Korekara Renai-hen (YOUのこれからこれから 恋愛編; 2012)
- You no Korekara Korekara Jinsei-hen (YOUのこれからこれから 人生編; 2014)
