= Kenya Yasuda =

Japanese water polo player

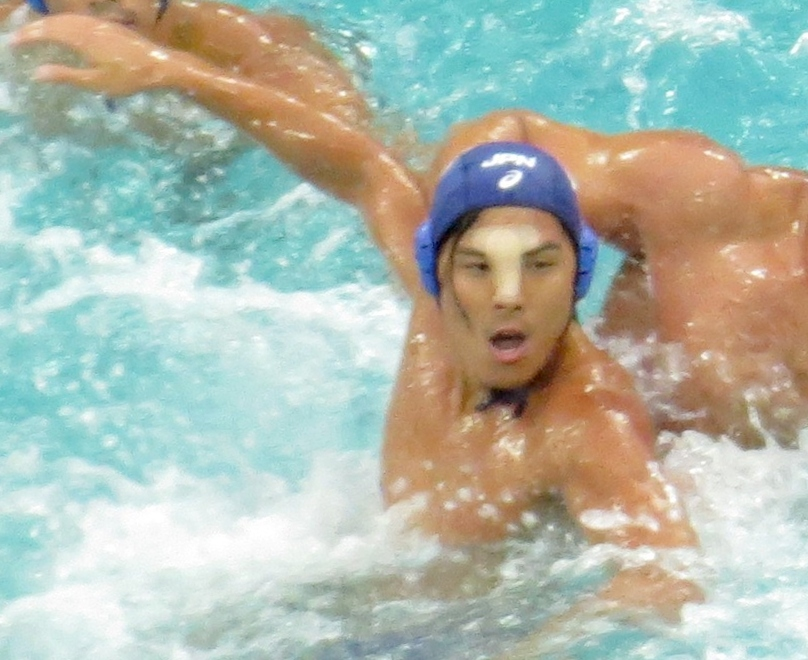
- Kenya Yasuda in 2016.

Personal information
- Born: 29 March 1989 (age 37) Toyama, Toyama, Japan
- Height: 182 cm (6 ft 0 in)
- Weight: 77 kg (170 lb)

Sport
- Sport: Water polo
- Club: Bourbon WP Club
Medal record
Representing Japan
Asian Games
Silver medal – second place	2014 Incheon	team

Kenya Yasuda (保田 賢也, Yasuda Ken'ya; born 29 March 1989) is a water polo player from Japan. He appeared in the Japanese Reality TV series Terrace House: Boys × Girls Next Door (2012), episodes 75 - 98 which depicts his water polo training and in which he expresses his dream to one day represent Japan in the Olympics. He makes a cameo appearance in the Japanese movie Terrace House: Closing Door (2015) in which he outlines the necessary steps he and his team must take to qualify for entry to the 2016 Rio Olympics. He was part of the Japanese team at the 2016 Summer Olympics, where the team was eliminated in the group stage.
