= Ryota Yamasato =

Japanese comedian, television and radio personality

- 山里亮太
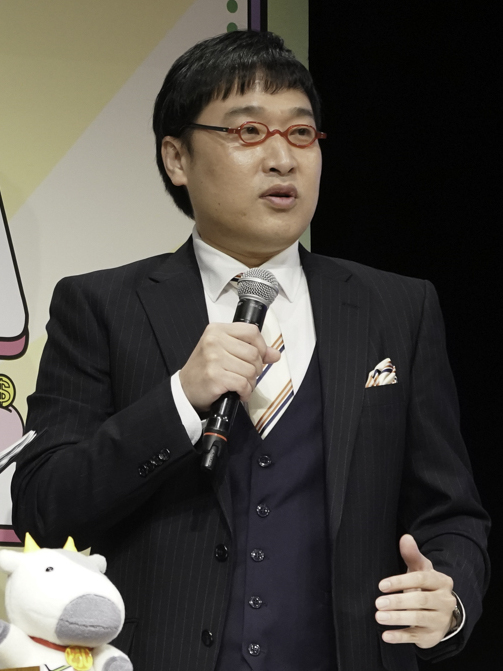
- Yamasato in July 2024
- Born: April 14, 1977 (age 49); Hanamigawa-ku, Chiba Prefecture, Japan
- Other name: Yama-chan
- Education: Kansai University
- Employer: Yoshimoto Kogyo
- Spouse: Yū Aoi (m. 2019)
- Children: 1

Comedy career
- Years active: 1999–present
- Genre: Manzai

Ryota Yamasato (Japanese: 山里亮太, Hepburn: Yamasato Ryōta; born April 14, 1977), also known as Yama-chan (山ちゃん), is a Japanese comedian and television and radio personality. He rose to fame in the 2000s as one half of the manzai comedy duo Nankai Candies. Outside Japan he is best known as one of the commentators on the reality television series Terrace House.

== Career ==
Yamasato is a member of the 22nd graduating class of Yoshimoto Kogyo's New Star Creation school of comedy in Osaka. His first known owarai comedy duo was Ashigaru Emperor (足軽エンペラー, Ashigaru Enperā) together with Tomio Nishida from 1999 to 2003. Yamasato played the role of the boke or "funny man" to Nishida's tsukkomi or "straight man". He then formed Nankai Candies (南海キャンディーズ) with Shizuyo Yamasaki in June 2003. However, in this duo Yamasato plays the tsukkomi, while Yamasaki is the boke. Nankai Candies took second place in the 2004 M-1 Grand Prix, leading to many television appearances and subsequently moved their base from Osaka to Tokyo. That year they also won the 25th ABC Newcomer Comedian Grand Prix Newcomer Award. In 2005 they received the 40th Kamigata Manzai Grand Prix Newcomer Award and the 43rd Golden Arrow Newcomer Award. They competed several more times in the M-1 Grand Prix; coming in ninth place in 2005 and eighth in 2009, and being eliminated in the semifinals in 2008, 2016 and 2017. Beginning in 2007, Nankai Candies were not active much while Yamasaki competed as a boxer. She even became a women's middleweight champion before retiring from the sport in 2015.

Beginning with season 3 of Terrace House: Boys × Girls Next Door on April 12, 2013, Yamasato became a studio commentator on the reality TV series Terrace House. He has continued this role on each installment of the franchise, where he is known as the cynical one who enjoys highlighting the house members' flaws. In 2015, he was given his own spin-off on Netflix Japan's YouTube channel titled Yama Channel where he comments solo.

Yamasato co-authored two books that were both released on June 25, 2013. News no Yomikata Oshiemasu! explains recent political and economic words in an easy-to-understand manner, while Yamasato Ryōta no 'Tarinai' Eigo teaches simple English for communication.

Yamasato played the villain in the 2016 Shuriken Sentai Ninninger vs. ToQger the Movie: Ninja in Wonderland. Since October 2016, Yamasato and his fellow Terrace House commentator You have co-hosted the puppet show Nehorin Pahorin on NHK Educational TV. They each voice mole puppets who co-interview the non-famous guest represented by a pig puppet. The anonymity afforded via the puppets and voice modulation allows the guests to talk candidly about topics not usually covered on mainstream TV, such as idol otaku or host club addiction.

Yamasato voiced the character Karasutengu in the 2017 anime film Pretty Cure Dream Stars!. He released Tensai wa Akirameta, a completely revised and updated version of his 2006 autobiographical book Tensai ni Naritai, on July 6, 2018, and it sold 100,000 copies in two months. A fan of One Piece since its beginning, Yamasato voiced the character Donald Moderate in the 2019 One Piece: Stampede film.

Yamasato and fellow comedian Masayasu Wakabayashi are the main subjects of the 2023 biographical series Passion for Punchlines (だが、情熱はある, Da ga, Jōnetsu ga aru; lit. 'However, The Passion is There') on Nippon TV, in which he was portrayed by Shintaro Morimoto.

== Personal life ==
On June 3, 2019, Yamasato married actress Yū Aoi. The two first met through Shizuyo Yamasaki, who co-starred with Aoi in the film Hula Girls (2006), and began dating in April 2019. In episode six of Terrace House: Tokyo 2019–2020, Yamasato credited his job on the show for the marriage, as Aoi is a fan and wanted to talk to him about it. On February 10, 2022, the couple announced that Aoi was pregnant with their first child and due in the summer. On August 10, 2022, Yamasato revealed that Aoi had given birth to their daughter.

== Selected filmography ==
=== Television ===
- Nihiiro Jean (2008–2015)
- Sukkiri (2009–present)
- Hirunandesu! (2011–2020)
- Out×Deluxe (2012–present)
- Terrace House: Boys × Girls Next Door (2013–2014)
- Terrace House: Boys & Girls in the City (2015–2016)
- Nehorin Pahorin (2016–present)
- Terrace House: Aloha State (2016–2017)
- Shin Shock-kan (2017–present)
- Tōdai-ō (2017–present)
- Terrace House: Opening New Doors (2017–2019)
- Gyakuten Jinsei (2019–present)
- Made in Japan! (2019–2020)
- Hinekure 3 (2019–2020)
- Terrace House: Tokyo 2019–2020 (2019–2020)
- ReAL eSports News (2019–present)
- Yamasato Ryota no Masaka no Berserker (2020)
- Doyō wa Nanisuru!? (2020–present)
- Azatokute Nani ga Warui no? (2020–present)

=== Live-action films ===
- Tomica Hero: Rescue Force Explosive Movie: Rescue the Mach Train! (2008) - Doctor Mad/Matarou Madono
- Terrace House: Closing Door (2015)
- Shuriken Sentai Ninninger vs. ToQger the Movie: Ninja in Wonderland (2016) - Dark Doctor Mavro
- My Brother, the Alien (2023) - Jaga (voice)

=== Animation ===
- Detective Conan: Full Score of Fear (2008)
- Aoi Bungaku (No Longer Human) (2009)
- Kikansha Tōmasu Dīzeru 10 no Gyakushū (2012)
- Pretty Cure Dream Stars! (2017)
- One Piece: Stampede (2019)
- Eiga Shimajirō Shimajirō to Yūki no Uta (2025) - Pepe
- ChaO (2025) - President Shi

=== Dubbing ===
- The Garfield Movie - Garfield

== Bibliography ==
- Tensai ni Naritai (天才になりたい; November 2006)
- Hajimete no Gravure. YGA Shashin-shū (はじめてのグラビア。YGA写真集; July 24, 2007) – editor
- News ga Motto Yoku Wakaru hon (ニュースがもっとよくわかる本; September 11, 2009) – co-authored with Akira Ikegami
- News no Yomikata Oshiemasu! (ニュースの読み方教えます!; June 25, 2013) – co-authored with Mita Masaki
- Yamasato Ryōta no 'Tarinai' Eigo (山里亮太の「たりない」英語; June 25, 2013) – co-authored with Masato Honma
- Tensai wa Akirameta (天才はあきらめた; July 6, 2018)
- Anoko no Yume wo Mita Ndesu. (あのコの夢を見たんです。; April 12, 2019)

== Championships and accomplishments ==
- DDT Pro-Wrestling
  - Ironman Heavymetalweight Championship (2 times)
