= ViVi (magazine) =

Japanese fashion magazine

- Categories: Fashion
- Frequency: Monthly
- Circulation: 234,370 (2011)
- Publisher: Kodansha
- First issue: May 1983
- Country: Japan, Taiwan, China, Hong Kong
- Based in: Tokyo
- Language: Japanese, simplified Chinese, traditional Chinese
- Website: NET ViVi

ViVi (ヴィヴィ) is a Japanese fashion magazine published by Kodansha. It is published in Japan, China, Taiwan, Hong Kong, and Thailand.

== History and profile ==
Vivi was first published in May 1983. The target age group are teens and young women 17–27 years old, with the main demographic of readers being college students and young office ladies.

The magazine's cover queen' is Namie Amuro, who has been featured on the cover the greatest number of times. Other artists frequently featured on the cover include Ayumi Hamasaki and Kumi Koda.

In Taiwan, Vivi is published in Chinese language.

The circulation of Vivi was 286,039 copies in 2010 and 234,370 copies in 2011.

== ViVi models ==
These models are regularly employed by ViVi magazine.

=== Current ===
- Nicole Fujita
- Erika Murakami
- Sakura Arianna
- Lina Arashi (ja)
- Ten Yamasaki
- Yuna Bridgman
- Seira
- Sakura Saiga
- Suzuka Chinzei (ja)

=== Previous ===
- Nanako Matsushima
- Mizuho Koga (ja)
- Sayo Aizawa
- Tomoko Yamaguchi
- Seri Iwahori (ja)
- Mayumi Sada
- Noriko Nakagoshi
- Mayu Gamō
- Megumi Mikimoto (ja)
- Yuri Iwata (ja)
- Aki Hatada (ja)
- Sachi Suzuki (ja)
- Jelly
- Maya Stenken
- Yurie (ja)
- Saya Ichikawa
- Naomi Ozawa (ja)
- Malia
- Camilla
- Kana Oya
- Jun Hasegawa
- Marie (ja)
- Kiko Mizuhara
- Chikako Watanabe (ja)
- Keiko Wakita (ja)
- Mayuko Arisue
- Lena Fujii
- Mary Sara
- Elli Rose (ja)
- Mitsuki Oishi
- Yukina Kinoshita
- Maggy
- Mai Miyagi
- Yui Sakuma
- Rola
- Kazunyolo
- Mayuko Kawakita
- Reina Triendl
- Tina Tamashiro
- Emma Jasmine (ja)
- Eri Tachibana (ja)
- Emma (ja)
- Alissa Yagi
- Maria Tani (ja)
- Miu
- Sachi Fujii (ja)
- Seika Furuhata

== Serial ==
The magazine features regular appearances by ViVi models and a monthly series of articles by popular singers of the readers' generation.

=== Current ===
- TEN-CORE by Ten Yamasaki
- Nikoholi by Nicole Fujita
- Fashion Geek by Seira

=== Previous ===
- Lena Likes by Rina Fujii
- TOMO'S DIARY by Tomomi Itano
- Mitsuki no hutû ga itiban (Mitsuki's normal is the Best) by Mitsuki Oishi
- EXO-SHOT by EXO
- Ayu no dezidezi nikki (AYU'S DIGIDIGI Diary) by Ayumi Hamasaki
- Katô miriya no fassyonn syô (Miliya Kato's Fashion Show) by Miliya Kato
- Shifuku tekina Yukina （Yukina like a private outfit）by Yukina Kinoshita
- Hamarindoru by Reina Triendl
- Beauty Muse (also appears in other magazines of the company such as "with") by Hinako Sano
- BOUNCE TWICE by TWICE
- Reina no naretara iina (Raina wishes she could be) by Reina Triendl
- P's STYLE by Tomohisa Yamashita
- Yagi no ota biyou (Yagi is a beauty geek) by Arisa Yagi
- Moderu x Moderu zine ( Models × Models zine) by ViVi models
- Shintenchi (New world） by Ten Yamasaki
