= Lauren Tsai =

American actress and illustrator (born 1998)

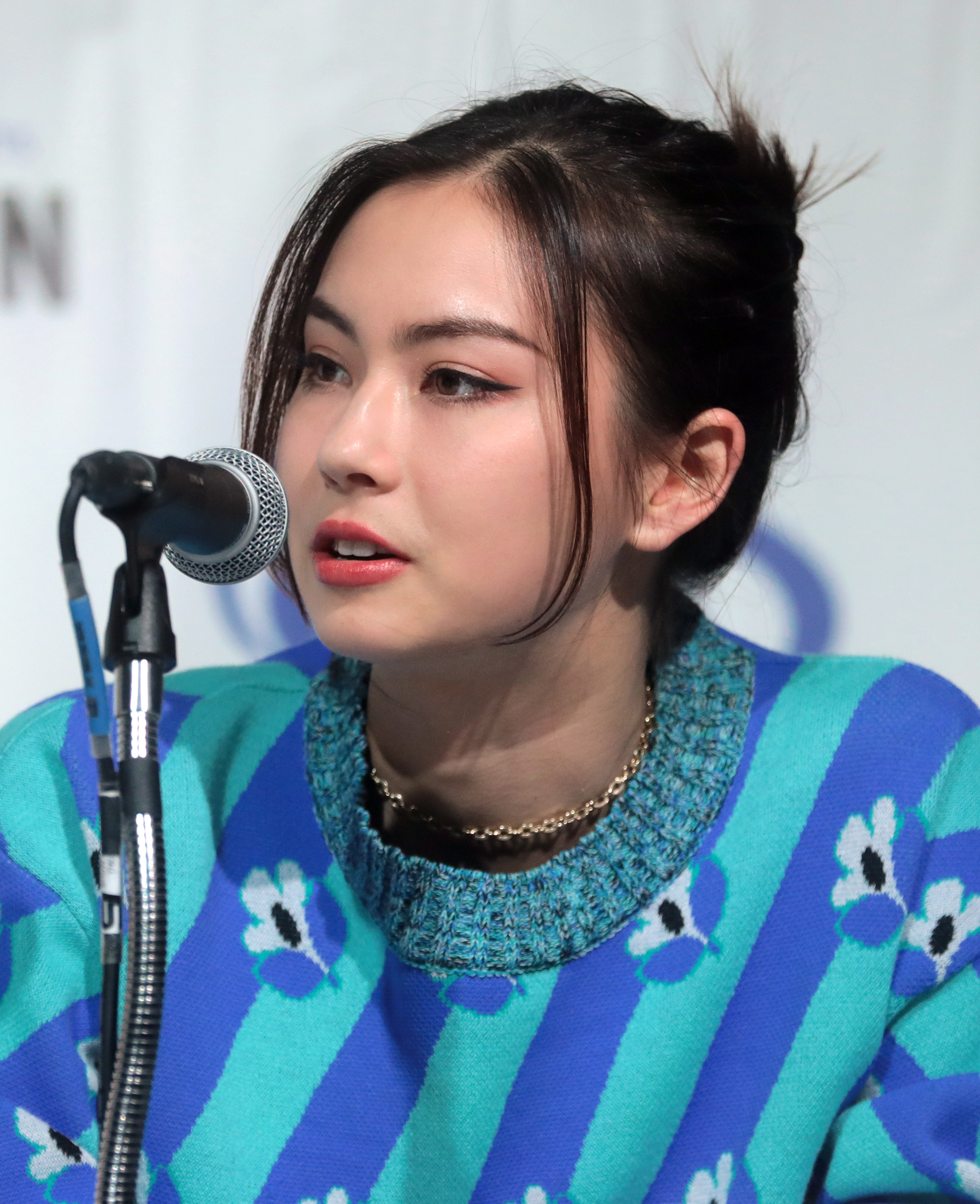
- Lauren Tsai at the 2019 WonderCon
- Born: February 11, 1998 (age 28); Wellesley, Massachusetts, U.S.
- Occupations: Visual artist; model; actress
- Years active: 2014–present
- Relatives: Ming Tsai (uncle); Stephen W. Tsai (grandfather); Li Baochen (great-grandfather)
- Modeling information
- Height: 1.73 m (5 ft 8 in)
- Hair color: Brown
- Eye color: Brown
- Agency: William Morris Endeavor

Lauren Tsai (born February 11, 1998) is an American visual artist and actor. She first became known to audiences in 2016 for her appearance in the Fuji TV and Netflix series Terrace House: Aloha State.

== Life ==
Lauren Tsai was born in Wellesley, Massachusetts, United States to a Chinese-American father and White-American mother.

Her family moved to Honolulu, Hawai'i when she was seven years old.

== Career ==
After moving out of the show's Honolulu house, she continued to pursue modeling and artistic work. As a model, she has been featured in publications such as Vogue, Women's Wear Daily and Marie Claire and was a global ambassador for Shiseido.

In 2018, she drew a variant cover for issue No.1 of West Coast Avengers followed by a variant cover for Captain Marvel No.1. She collaborated with Marc Jacobs on a line of apparel and accessories and brands such as Kojima Productions, A24, Nike and YOASOBI. Tsai has released collectibles with Medicom and How2Work and published two books, It's All for You and Passenger Seat. Tsai and her artwork appear in Hideo Kojima's Death Stranding 2: On the Beach.

In September 2023, she made her directorial debut with the animated music video for the Boygenius song Cool About It. She garnered a Clio award for her Boygenius Hollywood Bowl tour poster design.

Tsai created her first large-scale immersive installation in March 2025, My Dream: Our Hill, in partnership with The Landmark, accompanied by a panel discussion at Art Basel Hong Kong.

Her first solo immersive exhibition, The Dying World, was held in November 2025, featuring a full sized house built on the grounds of Hollywood Forever Cemetery, paintings, sculptures, drawings, sketch books, curated soundscapes and stop motion animation.

Tsai made her art fair debut, and first collaboration with Perrotin Gallery, at Art Basel Hong Kong in March 2026. She presented a smaller, immersive rendition of The Dying World including a life-sized sculpture of her character Astrid called a "Poison Little Girl." She participated in a panel discussion at the Harrod's Hive called "Reinventing Luxury: Youth Imagination, Creative Worlds, and the Future of Design."

Tsai's animated short, The Dying World: Forgetting, premiered at Annecy Festival in June 2025.

Tsai made her acting debut in the third and final season of the FX series Legion as Switch, a young mutant who has time traveling abilities. She then starred in the 2021 Netflix film Moxie, directed by Amy Poehler. Tsai stars in the HBO comedy series Rooster, starring Steve Carell, created by Bill Lawrence and Matt Tarses.

Lauren has more than 1 million followers on Instagram as of December 2025.

== Artistry ==
Tsai describes her sketchbook as "probably my most cherished item".

=== Television ===
Year	Title	Role	Notes
2016–2017	Terrace House: Aloha State	Herself	17 episodes
2017	Shōsuke Tanihara's 25th Meal	Herself	
2019	Legion	Jia-yi / Switch	Main role (season 3)
2022	Game Of Spy	Hiyama Rei	Main role
2026	Rooster	Sunny	Main role

=== Film ===
Year	Title	Role	Notes
2021	Moxie	Claudia	Main role
2025	The Dying World Part One: Forgetting	—N/a	Writer and director; short film
2026	Prelude to The End	—N/a	Alongside My Chemical Romance; short film

=== Music videos ===
Year	Title	Role	Notes
2023	Cool About It	—N/a	Director

=== Video games ===
Year	Title	Role	Notes
2025	Death Stranding 2: On the Beach	Lauren Tsai / Artist	Voice, likeness, art
