= Terrace House: Boys × Girls Next Door =

- Most of the cast members of Terrace House: Boys × Girls Next Door. From left: Dyki, Hana, Rie, Tetsuya, Miwako (lying down), Yosuke (back), Rina, Mai, Oji, Aya, Seina, Masato, Momoko, Shota, and Midori.
- Genre: Reality
- Presented by: You; Reina Triendl; Yoshimi Tokui; Azusa Babazono; Ryota Yamasato; Hiroomi Tosaka
- Opening theme: "We Are Never Ever Getting Back Together" by Taylor Swift
- Ending theme: "Chasing Cars" by Snow Patrol
- Country of origin: Japan
- Original language: Japanese
- No. of seasons: 8
- No. of episodes: 98

Production
- Production location: Japan
- Running time: 30 minutes
- Production company: Fuji Television

Original release
- Network: FNS (Fuji TV)
- Release: October 12, 2012 – September 29, 2014

Related
- Terrace House: Closing Door

Terrace House: Boys × Girls Next Door (Japanese: テラスハウス ボーイズ ガールズ ネクストドア, Hepburn: Terasu Hausu Bōizu Gāruzu Nekusuto Doa) is a Japanese reality television series and the first installment of the Terrace House franchise. It follows three men and three women as they temporarily live together in a modernistic house with a terrace located in the Shōnan area of Japan. The cast moved from the first house to a second one beginning with season five in October 2013. The show aired on Fuji Television's "Cool TV" segment from October 12, 2012 to September 29, 2014 for eight seasons, after which the 2015 theatrical film Closing Door was released as a conclusion to the show.

Boys × Girls Next Door and the Closing Door film are the only iterations of the franchise produced solely by Fuji TV. Beginning with Boys & Girls in the City, the franchise has been co-produced by Fuji TV and Netflix and released internationally.

== Cast ==
No.	Name			Occupation	Date of birth	Appearance	
No.	English	Japanese	Nickname(s)	Occupation	Date of birth	Eps	#
01	Tetsuya Sugaya	菅谷哲也	Tecchan, Tetsu	aspiring firefighter	July 28, 1993	1–98	98
02	Seina Shimabukuro	島袋聖南	Seinasan	model	April 4, 1987	1–29, 65–98	62
03	Rie Kitahara	北原里英	Ricchan	idol (AKB48)	June 24, 1991	1–12	12
04	Masato Yukawa	湯川正人	Makun	pro surfer	January 10, 1992	1–12	12
05	Shota Nakatsugawa	中津川翔太	Shokun	university student	November 18, 1987	1–15	15
06	Momoko Takeuchi	竹内桃子	Momochan, Chanmomo	aspiring author	June 14, 1991	1–25	25
07	Hana Imai	今井華	Hanachan	gyaru model	November 12, 1992	14–38	24
08	Dyki Miyagi	宮城大樹	Dykikun	kickboxer	January 23, 1990	16–61	45
09	Tetsuya Iwanaga	岩永徹也	Oji	pharmacist	October 16, 1986	19–38	19
10	Aya Kondou	近藤あや	Ayachan	university student	November 10, 1991	27–38	11
11	Miwako Kakei	筧美和子	Miko, Michan, Miwachan	gravure idol	March 6, 1994	29–61	32
12	Midori Takechi	武智ミドリ	Me	freeter	August 20, 1992	39–50	11
13	Rina Sumioka	住岡梨奈	Rinati	musician	February 15, 1990	39–65	26
14	Yosuke Imai	今井洋介	Yosan	photographer	October 29, 1984	39–74	35
15	Mai Nagatani	永谷真絵	Maimai, Chay	musician	October 23, 1990	51–74	23
16	Chie Onuki	小貫智恵	Chichan	university student	July 4, 1990	63–74	11
17	Ippei Shima	島一平	Ippeichan	comedian (Earth)	July 18, 1984	63–87	24
18	Frances Cihi	フランセス・スィーヒ	Frankie	painter	May 27, 1988	75–87	12
19	Ryoko Hirasawa	平澤遼子	Ryochan	company employee	September 25, 1989	75–98	23
20	Kenya Yasuda	保田賢也	Kenken	water polo player	March 29, 1989	75–98	23
21	Michiko Yamanaka	山中美智子	Michan	manager, designer	November 29, 1985	87–98	11
22	Daiki Ito	伊東大輝	Daiki	windsurfer	January 19, 1994	88–98	10

=== Recurring guests ===
Name	Japanese	Occupation	Connection
Hisato Kojima	小嶋久登	owner of Kamakura Loco Mart & Garden	Tetsuya's and Ippei's employer
Rina Ohashi	大橋リナ	model	Hana's friend
Takashi Ito	伊藤隆	president of Target	Dyki's employer
Raoumaru	羅王丸	kickboxer	Dyki's friend
Mai Miyagi	宮城舞	model	Dyki's older sister
jyA-Me	ヤミー	singer	Yosuke's friend
Magu Manpei	マグ万平	comedian (Earth)	Ippei's friend
Itta Niimi	新美一太	owner of Jammin'	Seina's employer

== Episodes ==
Season	Episodes	Originally released	
Season	Episodes	First released	Last released
1	13	October 12, 2012	January 4, 2013
2	12	January 11, 2013	March 29, 2013
3	13	April 12, 2013	July 5, 2013
4	12	July 12, 2013	September 27, 2013
5	12	October 15, 2013	January 6, 2014
6	12	January 13, 2014	March 31, 2014
7	13	April 14, 2014	July 14, 2014
8	11	July 21, 2014	September 29, 2014

=== Season 1 (2012–13) ===
No. overall	No. in season	Title	Original release date
1	1	"Moving to the Terrace House"	October 12, 2012
Three men (Masato, Tetsuya, Shota) and three women (Seina, Momoko, Rie) who have never met before move into a sharehouse called the Terrace House together. They introduce themselves to each other, learning that Shota is the only one in a relationship, and go out to dinner. Later, Tetsuya confides in Shota that he is most interested in Rie.
2	2	"The Beginning of Something New Or..."	October 19, 2012
Momoko reveals that she has had plastic surgery and will be getting another minor surgery in the next month or two. Tetsuya gets a part-time job gardening at Kamakura Loco Mart & Garden, and Seina has a modeling audition that goes badly. The house members watch the first episode of Terrace House on TV and are disappointed by people's reactions on the internet.
3	3	"Nobody Knows the Way She Feels"	October 26, 2012
In order to get closer to her, Tetsuya goes grocery shopping with Rie. Concerned about her career and her drinking, Seina wants to cleanse her body and begins exercising with Masato. Momoko reveals to a friend that she feels like she can not relate to or ask advice from her housemates because both her parents have passed away and she must think about her future.
4	4	"Thank You for Being Here"	November 2, 2012
The members go to a birthday party for Masato's mother. Seina accompanies Masato to a surfing photoshoot, and Momoko and Shota go to an exhibit and lunch. Tetsuya and Rie watch the Orionid meteor shower on the house's terrace. After watching Momoko's reveal in the third episode of Terrace House, the housemates reveal their own family struggles and comfort her.
5	5	"It's Never Too Late to Start"	November 9, 2012
Tetsuya learns that he did not pass the exam to become a firefighter, and realizes that it was never his dream, only a career he chose to earn money and take care of his family. Tetsuya asks Rie on a date and she agrees, and Seina lands a job walking in Girls Award.
6	6	"Puppy Love"	November 16, 2012
Tetsuya, Rie and Seina travel to Chiba Prefecture to watch Masato compete in a competition, but he gets eliminated in the semifinals. They spend the night at an inn and the following day Tetsuya and Rie go on their date in Yokohama.
7	7	"The One She Truly Longs For...?"	November 23, 2012
Momoko submits a column to a news website. The members go to Girls Award to watch Rie perform with AKB48 and Seina walk the runway. The members also throw a house party with friends, where Masato and Seina kiss.
8	8	"Disharmony in the Terrace House"	November 30, 2012
Masato takes Rie to Enoshima for pancakes as she previously suggested to the group. The members throw a birthday party for Shota. Momoko has plastic surgery on her nose, and later holds a house meeting where they discuss using the cars and doing chores.
9	9	"Playtime Is Over"	December 7, 2012
Momoko and Tetsuya go out to eat and she tells him he has to be braver with Rie by holding her hand. Tetsuya becomes envious of the other two guys because they are confident with their career paths. Masato asks Seina out to eat where he tells her he is thinking of leaving the house.
10	10	"The Decisions"	December 14, 2012
Masato tells more members that he is leaving the house; with it being the off-season in surfing, he feels the need to go abroad to practice like everyone else in order to advance. Tetsuya decides to strive to be an actor, a goal he gave up in high school due to finances.
11	11	"Getting Back Up Again"	December 21, 2012
Tetsuya visits a former mentor about getting into acting, Seina has an audition for Glitter, and Momoko's column for the news website is published. Tetsuya asks Rie out on another date and she agrees, but later when he is at work she tells the other members that she will be leaving the house.
12	12	"Moving Out of the Terrace House"	December 28, 2012
Tetsuya and Rie go on their date to Kamakura, where she tells him that she will be leaving the house, and slaps his hand away when he tries to hold hers. The house has a Christmas party that also acts as Masato and Rie's goodbye party. After three months together, everybody cries saying goodbye to the two the next morning, and Masato leaves Tetsuya a letter.
13	13	"Special Edition"	January 4, 2013
Special episode where commentator You re-watches and comments on scenes from the first twelve episodes.

=== Season 2 (2013) ===
No. overall	No. in season	Title	Original release date
14	1	"The Girl Has Come"	January 11, 2013
You introduces Reina Triendl who will be her co-commentator for future episodes. New female member Hana, a gyaru model for Egg, moves into the house. Hana and Tetsuya go grocery shopping so that she can show off her cooking skills. Shota returns from a trip to Kansai and announces that he is now engaged to his girlfriend, and that he will be leaving the house.
15	2	"A Snowy Goodbye"	January 18, 2013
Hana goes back home to Nagatoro, Saitama for her Coming of Age Ceremony. Even though he told the girls he would be leaving around lunchtime, Shota has Tetsuya drive him to the station in the morning before they wake up so he can leave without seeing them cry.
16	3	"Hungry for Love"	January 25, 2013
New member Dyki, a professional kickboxer and gym instructor, moves into the house and tells Tetsuya that based on first impressions and appearances, he is most interested in Hana. Likewise, Hana tells the girls she finds Dyki more attractive than she expected. With everyone progressing at their work, Seina feels anxious about her career and questions why she is at Terrace House.
17	4	"The Truth Behind the Tears"	February 11, 2013
Seina learns that she has a second interview for Glitter. Dyki and Hana go on a date exploring their new surroundings together. Tetsuya learns via the internet that Seina and Masato, who has postponed his trip abroad, have been seen out together and confronts her about it. Momoko, Seina and Tetsuya go to the unveiling of Shota's grad project, after which Seina asks Shota out and tells him that she likes Masato.
18	5	"Declaration of Love"	February 8, 2013
Tetsuya has dinner with Masato where they talk about Seina. Tetsuya begins taking acting classes, and Momoko gets a job writing lyrics for a song. Hana makes Dyki dinner and agrees to make him healthy food when he is losing weight for his match. Hana, Tetsuya and Seina go to Target, Dyki's gym, to workout. Seina, Tetsuya and Momoko see Masato off for America at Narita International Airport, where Seina tells him that she liked him.
19	6	"No Sweet Valentine"	February 15, 2013
Masato reveals that he has been thinking about Seina and tells her they should go on a date if they both feel the same when he returns; he asks if she will wait and she says she will, before he embraces her and kisses her forehead. Tetsuya has his first acting gig as an extra on the drama The Case Files of Biblia Bookstore, which stars Terrace House commentator Reina. The girls make the boys Valentine's Day chocolate (giri choco) and the new male member arrives.
20	7	"Crushes Have No Limits"	February 22, 2013
New member Tetsuya Iwanaga, a pharmacist and model for Men's Non-no, moves into the house and is given the nickname "Oji". Oji goes to dinner with the girls, and Momoko later states that she finds him attractive. Dyki asks Seina for advice as there are two girls he is interested in and has feelings for, Hana and a girl who does not live in the house, and does not want to go into his match undecided. Later, Seina tells Hana about Dyki's dilemma.
21	8	"Two Love Triangles"	March 1, 2013
Seina has her photoshoot for Glitter. After Seina informs Dyki that she told Hana about his dilemma, he asks Hana out on a date picking strawberries in Yokosuka and dinner at Yokohama Marine Tower, where, when asked, she tells Dyki she could see him as a boyfriend. Tetsuya tells Seina that he can not keep his eyes off of Hana, but would be happy if Dyki and her are a good match, to which Seina asks if he is truly OK leaving it like that or is only holding back for Dyki's sake?
22	9	"More Than Just Friends"	March 8, 2013
Hana quits working for Egg magazine and has her first shoot for Jelly, but has doubts about her career. Tetsuya goes running with Hana, and takes another acting class. Hana sees Tetsuya's conversation with Seina while watching episode 21 of Terrace House and confronts him, to which he responds by telling her that he is interested in her.
23	10	"His Final Choice"	March 15, 2013
With his match approaching in one week, Dyki begins cutting weight and tells his boss that he will confess his feelings after the match. Hana makes Dyki a weight-loss bento. The other members wonder why Momoko has not been home for four days, and when she returns she tells them she will be leaving the house after Dyki's match. Dyki has lunch with his sister, Mai, and tells her he will also be leaving the house after his match.
24	11	"Showdown"	March 22, 2013
Tetsuya has lunch with Shota, whom he learns did not end up going to graduate school, and reiterates his concern of losing his friendship with Hana and Dyki. He then apologizes to Dyki, who tells Tetsuya that he has decided on Hana. The housemates all go to Korakuen Hall to watch Dyki's match at RISE 92, which he wins by split decision to become the RISE bantamweight champion. After the match, Hana waits for Dyki alone in the stands and he tells her he likes her.
25	12	"Kiss Kiss Kiss..."	March 29, 2013
After Dyki's confession, Hana tells him that his record is two-for-two today, the two kiss and inform the others that they are officially dating now. Although he was going to leave the house, Dyki decides that it is easier for him and Hana to be together while living at Terrace House and decides to stay. Oji asks Seina out on a date where, despite Seina telling him she is waiting for Masato, Oji reveals he has strong feelings for her. On her last night, Momoko tells Oji that she really likes him before leaving the next morning after six months at the house.

=== Season 3 (2013) ===
No. overall	No. in season	Title	Original release date
26	1	"Brand New Terrace House"	April 12, 2013
Tetsuya tells Hana that he is happy for her and Dyki, and she encourages him to go after the new girl that will be coming. Oji has a photoshoot and reveals that Seina said they could go on another date while she waits for Masato, who will be returning to Japan soon. You and Reina announce that four more commentators will be joining them in the studio for future episodes and play video clips of Yoshimi Tokui, Hiroomi Tosaka, Azusa Babazono and Ryota Yamasato each commenting on past scenes.
27	2	"Babyfaced Foxy Girl"	April 19, 2013
Seina reveals that Masato has not been in contact with her, and, later, that he does not pick up when she calls him. Tetsuya and Oji sleep in the theater so Hana can spend the night with Dyki in the boys' bedroom. Seina agrees to go on another date with Oji. New member Aya moves in looking for a relationship, and says she is most interested in Oji.
28	3	"He's Back Again"	April 26, 2013
Seina goes on her second date with Oji, where she tells him she wants to just be friends and is thinking of leaving the house to travel abroad to gain skills as a model. Dyki books a non-title match, but Hana will be abroad unable to support him during his weight cut. Aya is bothered by the dirty house, leading to a group house cleaning. Masato visits the house and is confronted by Seina on why he did not contact her and asks him which is more important, surfing or her?
29	4	"Sudden Goodbye"	May 3, 2013
Given the ultimatum, Masato chooses surfing. The members have a birthday dinner for Seina, where she tells them she will be leaving the house the following day. After she leaves, the others tell Oji how things went with Masato and criticize him for not being passionate enough with his feelings. New member Miwako, a gravure idol, moves in.
30	5	"Losing Love, Finding Love"	May 10, 2013
When asked by Dyki, Tetsuya says that out of all the girls who have been there, Miwako is number one to him. Oji calls and asks Seina out, but she says no to a one-on-one date. Hana has a photoshoot at the house, and her and Dyki's schedules never line up so they have not been on any dates since becoming official. Oji and Aya agree to go out sometime.
31	6	"One-Sided Love"	May 17, 2013
Oji and Aya go on a date, and plan to go on another. Tetsuya and Miwako go shopping and make plans to go skateboarding. All the members agree to go camping, with Tetsuya in charge of planning. Dyki and Hana consider leaving Terrace House so they can save the four hours usually spent traveling back and forth to the city and spend it together.
32	7	"Lost Passion"	May 24, 2013
The house members, sans Hana, all go to Ariake Coliseum to watch Dyki in his non-title fight at Road to Glory Japan -85kg, which he wins by knockout in the first round. All of the members go camping at Lake Kawaguchi, where they split off into three couples to talk; Tetsuya and Miwako agree to go out to eat and skateboard; Oji and Aya agree to go to the aquarium, although he dodges the question of whether he still likes Seina; Dyki and Hana agree that their passion for each other has faded.
33	8	"Forbidden Love"	May 31, 2013
After two months together, Dyki and Hana decide to break up but remain friends. Miwako has a photoshoot for B.L.T., while Tetsuya gets a role starring in a music video for SoulJa. Tetsuya and Miwako go on their skateboarding date. Tetsuya meets up with Momoko to get romantic advice. Miwako reveals to her friend that she does not have romantic feelings for Tetsuya, but is instead interested in Dyki.
34	9	"Sugar & Spice"	June 7, 2013
Tetsuya gets a role in the drama Last Cinderella. It is revealed that Aya has been hopping into Oji's bed to cuddle and sleep at his asking, although he claims not to remember. Hana tells Dyki she is thinking of leaving the house. Oji and Aya go on their aquarium date.
35	10	"I've Been Waiting"	June 14, 2013
On their date Aya reiterates that she likes Oji, but Oji tells her he sees her as a younger sister. Upon finding out, Hana immediately confronts Oji stating his actions are unacceptable considering he knew how Aya felt. Tetsuya shoots for Last Cinderella. Miwako tells Hana she is interested in Dyki and gets her blessing to pursue him. Aya and Miwako go to Dyki's gym to workout, where Miwako waits for him to get off work so they can go out to eat.
36	11	"The Night of Confession"	June 21, 2013
After returning from dinner with Miwako, Dyki assures Tetsuya that nothing is going on between them. Oji tells Aya he is thinking of leaving the house because it is awkward living with her now, but that they can still hang out until he leaves. The male members learn of Miwako's interest in Dyki and lack of interest in Tetsuya from watching episode 33 of Terrace House. Dyki assures Tetsuya that he has no interest in Miwako because he is his friend.
37	12	"Just the Way You Are"	June 28, 2013
Tetsuya goes surfing with Masato. Dyki has friends over for a barbecue and although he reiterates his non-interest in Miwako, says that if Tetsuya gets rejected by her, he might think about it. Tetsuya receives criticism from the girls when they watch his acting in Last Cinderella. Miwako questions her career, specifically how she is inclined to do more erotic shoots even though she is uncomfortable with them. Aya visits a realtor to look at homes as she is thinking about leaving the house soon. The members have a goodbye party for Hana, Oji and Aya with Seina and Momoko attending.
38	13	"The Decision of a 19-Year-Old"	July 5, 2013
At the party everyone is curious what the "love-triangle" of Tetsuya, Dyki and Miwako will do as the only three left in the house. Hana, Oji and Aya leave the house the next morning after five, four and two-and-a-half months respectively. Tetsuya has a second shoot for Last Cinderella, and Dyki books his next match. Tetsuya tells Miwako that he is putting his feelings for her aside to focus on acting.

=== Season 4 (2013) ===
No. overall	No. in season	Title	Original release date
39	1	"Ready for Summer"	July 12, 2013
Three new members move in; Rina, a musician who hopes the environment will help her songwriting, Yosuke, a photographer who also surfs and plays guitar, and Midori, an occasional model who is half-Native American and wants to become a fashion-related producer. That night Rina has a concert and Midori makes dinner for everyone.
40	2	"He Is Mr. Perfect"	July 19, 2013
Midori has a fight with her boyfriend on the phone and they consider breaking up, after which she gets advice from Yosuke. Tetsuya shoots the SoulJa music video, and Rina works on a new song. Tetsuya tells Dyki that he can not attend his upcoming match due to having a stage play, similarly Miwako tells him she might be late due to a modeling audition. Dyki says that this match will be his last in the house as he again announces that he will be leaving.
41	3	"A Girl Like Everyone Else"	July 26, 2013
Yosuke gives Rina advice about her career, then photographs Midori at the beach as she previously offered, and is asked by Miwako to take her headshots. Tetsuya starts rehearsals for the play Teacher. Miwako and Dyki go out to eat before he begins cutting weight, where he tells her he only sees her as a housemate; causing her to regret not having acted earlier.
42	4	"Shaking Emotions"	August 2, 2013
On a girls night out, Midori says that she is interested in Yosuke. Miwako visits Aya, who tells her that she should make sure not to have any regrets with Dyki. The members, sans Tetsuya, go to Rina's concert. Miwako makes Dyki a weight-loss bento, and decides to confess her feelings again after his match.
43	5	"Twisted Fate"	August 9, 2013
Dyki reveals to his sister that at his medical checkup before his fight, a "shadow" on a brain image was seen, meaning he might have to quit kickboxing. Midori, Yosuke, Hana and Miwako, who just makes it after passing her audition, go to Korakuen Hall to watch Dyki's fight at RISE 94, which he wins by unanimous decision. After the match, Miwako confesses her feelings to Dyki a second time, but he restates that he only sees her as a friend. Dyki goes to the hospital where he learns that he has an arachnoid cyst and is told he can not continue kickboxing.
44	6	"Bye-Bye Champion"	August 16, 2013
Even if he has brain surgery, Dyki must retire from kickboxing. The members, sans Dyki, go and watch Tetsuya in the play Teacher. The house has a surprise birthday party for Tetsuya with Hana and Masato, who happens to be Midori's ex-boyfriend, attending. Depressed, Dyki does not attend and later explains why to the entire house, where he also asks if he can stay in the house until he finds something else to do.
45	7	"Coming Out!!!"	August 23, 2013
Dyki continues to work at his gym as a trainer while he thinks of his future, then goes to the beach with Tetsuya where they visit Aya. Yosuke has a meeting about exhibiting his photography and then goes out to eat with his father, where he talks about revealing a secret to his housemates. Midori visits Yosuke at work and asks him out to a festival in Fujisawa and to light fireworks on the beach. Yosuke reveals to the men that he was previously married to a Norwegian woman, that he has a child, and that he is interested in a former member of Terrace House.
46	8	"Go for Broke"	August 30, 2013
Having become interested in Hana, Yosuke gets her number from Dyki and asks her out. Dyki begins studying for his high school diploma as the first step towards his new goal of working in childcare. Rina asks Yosuke out to dinner as thanks for taking photos of her for her work, and they agree to go out again. After the date, Yosuke tells the guys that he is now interested in Rina too. Yosuke and Hana go on their date, where Yosuke asks her to be his girlfriend despite having only met her twice before.
47	9	"He Is Not Mr. Perfect"	September 6, 2013
Hana turns Yosuke down saying she just wants to be friends. Unable to understand his textbooks, Dyki drops down to middle school level work first. Rina asks Yosuke on a date to Kamakura, where he tells her he is divorced, has a daughter, and recently confessed to Hana.
48	10	"Going Up in Flames"	September 13, 2013
Midori begins working part-time at a clothing boutique. Yosuke gets angry at internet comments attacking his character over his confession to Hana and interest in Rina. His housemates also make similar jokes causing an outburst, after which they talk it out and advise him to ignore the comments like they do. Miwako helps Dyki with his studies and asks him out to eat as she has something to tell him.
49	11	"Stay by My Side"	September 20, 2013
Miwako and Dyki visit Aya and have lunch, after which she tells him she felt like leaving the house after being rejected by him but stayed to help him find a new goal. Now that he has one, Miwako is about to tell him she is leaving, but Dyki asks her to stay to support him longer as he has only just begun it. Dyki has an interview for a part-time job at a daycare. After being gone for a couple days, Yosuke returns and tells the members he is leaving the house due to the events of the previous episode.
50	12	"We Are Moving Out!!"	September 27, 2013
The members all talk Yosuke into staying, and later have a birthday party for Midori. With Terrace House moving houses, Midori decides it is a good time to leave and says goodbye. Yosuke has his photography exhibit. The five remaining members pack and move out of the house.

=== Season 5 (2013–14) ===
No. overall	No. in season	Title	Original release date
51	1	"New House, New Girl, New Love"	October 14, 2013
The five remaining members move into a new larger house with an ocean-view. New member Mai, a musician, joins and says she did so because her major label debut album did not sell well. Mai also tearfully explains that she has a complex over people assuming she is not truly passionate about being a singer-songwriter because she comes from a wealthy family. When asked by the girls, Mai says she is most interested in Tetsuya, likewise, Tetsuya ranks Mai number one in conversation with the guys.
52	2	"There Must Be a Catch"	October 21, 2013
Dyki has an interview for and gets hired as a daycare worker. Miwako wins a competition, via public vote, to become the new reporter for the show Kokoshira on Mezamashi TV. Tetsuya teaches Mai how to surf at her request. After which, Miwako informs Tetsuya that Mai is most interested in him. However, at the exact same time Mai tells Rina that Tetsuya was unexpectedly "smooth" on the date, which is not the type of guy she likes.
53	3	"Jealousy"	October 28, 2013
Mai, Tetsuya and Yosuke play guitar together, but the just-learning Tetsuya is unable to keep up. Dyki, Rina, Yosuke and Mai go to lunch together. Concerned, Yosuke later asks Rina what is distancing her from the others. Rina tearfully explains that she is uncomfortable telling others her true thoughts/feelings and ends up putting up a wall, but is trying to change that. The housemates, sans Rina, go to Mai's concert and out to dinner after, where Mai asks Yosuke to take photos of her for work.
54	4	"Singing a Different Melody"	November 4, 2013
Miwako has her first day as a reporter, while Dyki has his first day at the daycare. Miwako tells Dyki she will leave the house when she is confident with her job and asks him why he stopped her from leaving the house previously, to which he admits he was being selfish and just feels safer with her watching over him. Yosuke works towards his upcoming photography exhibit/concert, and practices with Rina for a duet at her concert. Tetsuya asks Mai out for her birthday.
55	5	"Love Is Like Fireworks"	November 11, 2013
Due to rain, Tetsuya and Mai go to an indoor bowling alley in Chigasaki and afterwards watch fireworks in Enoshima, where he gives her earrings as a birthday present. Mai makes Tetsuya katsukarē for breakfast, but his unenthusiastic response and, later, his jokingly flirting with Miwako and Rina, turns Mai off. Yosuke asks Rina out again. The house has a joint birthday party for Mai and Yosuke.
56	6	"A Love Song All So Suddenly..."	November 28, 2013
Mai tells the girls she has lost interest in Tetsuya, which Miwako later tells him and Yosuke before suggesting maybe it was all an act to stand out on the Terrace House show. An idea that spreads among the members. Rina tells the girls that her feelings for Yosuke are complicated and she is hesitate, but says she will go with him to an amusement park for fun in a conversation partly overheard by Yosuke. Yosuke tells Dyki he will confess his love to Rina on their date in a song he wrote for her. Yosuke confronts Rina about the partly overheard conversation and the date is cancelled, but plays her the song and asks her to be his girlfriend.
57	7	"Is It a Dry Flower"	November 25, 2013
Rina calls Yosuke an important friend, but turns him down. The next day they have their duet performance at her concert. The guys go out with Masato and talk about their girl problems. Feeling some distance, Miwako asks Mai if the joke flirting is the real reason she stopped liking Tetsuya or if it was an act, to which Mai says it was real and explains she worries what other people think of her and has been putting up a wall. Miwako suggests Mai hold a meeting with everyone to address people misunderstanding her and thinking she is fake, which she does.
58	8	"First Confession of Love"	December 2, 2013
With people voicing that they think her actions are fake and contradictory at the meeting, Mai states that they are not but agrees she has been more concerned with her stage persona on the show than her actual self. After, Mai tells Tetsuya that her romantic feelings for him have faded away, which Tetsuya accepts but says he really likes her. With her popularity greatly increased from Terrace House, Rina's management want her to put out a new song, but Rina privately questions if these people are actual fans of her music. Dyki doubts if daycare work is something he wants to do long term as there is no thrill in it like kickboxing.
59	9	"Fourth Time Being Honest"	December 9, 2013
Dyki asks Hana out to tell her he is interested in getting into the entertainment business and thinking of leaving the house. Miwako has a shoot for Weekly Shōnen Magazine. Mai's agency tells her that they feel the Terrace House show is giving her a bad image. Yosuke travels to Kesennuma for photos, but finds it still damaged from the 2011 Tōhoku earthquake and tsunami. Dyki tells the guys about his new career goal and, for the fourth time, that he will be leaving the house.
60	10	"The Last Lie Is a White Lie"	December 16, 2013
Yosuke has his photo exhibition/concert in Isumi. Tetsuya and Mai go out in Yokohama. Miwako reveals that she will be leaving the house after Dyki, but asks everyone not to tell him.
61	11	"I Will Be in Friends All the Time"	December 23, 2013
The house throws a Christmas party with Tetsuya inviting Midori and Raoumaru as they were part of helping Dyki through his retirement from kickboxing. Dyki again apologizes for being vague with and selfish when he asked Miwako to stay for him. The next day Dyki leaves Terrace House, not before leaving letters behind for everyone, and unbeknownst to him, Miwako leaves right after.
62	12	"Vogue Word Award"	January 6, 2014
Special episode where the studio commentators vote for the catchphrase of Terrace House after re-watching scenes that include the nominated phrases. Hana's catchphrase of "vibes" (バイブス) is voted the winner.

=== Season 6 (2014) ===
No. overall	No. in season	Title	Original release date
63	1	"Time-Limited Cinderella Girl"	January 13, 2014
New members, university student Chie and comedian Ippei, move into the house. Chie reveals that her time in the house is limited as she will leave when she graduates to begin working in March. The members decide to cook dinner together and get to know each other. Mai reveals that after their lunch in Yokohama, she has been feeling as if she misunderstood Tetsuya and wants to go out with him again.
64	2	"It's Time to Sing Goodbye"	January 20, 2014
Ippei has a comedy show in Shinjuku with his partner Magu, but it does not go well. Ippei and Chie get along well, and he asks her out on a walk along the ocean. Mai asks Tetsuya out to eat. Rina plays the members her new song which is about Terrace House.
65	3	"Coming Back"	January 27, 2014
Rina announces she will be leaving the next day, and privately tells Yosuke he is an important person to her. She leaves the next morning after six months in the house. Tetsuya goes back home to Asahi, Chiba for his Coming of Age Ceremony. Chie and Ippei go to Yuigahama for lunch, and later surprise the others by cooking dinner. Yosuke appears in a music video for jyA-Me and practices with her for a guest appearance at her concert. Original house member Seina moves back in to Terrace House.
66	4	"It's My Life"	February 3, 2014
Seina reveals that her modeling trip abroad went so badly that she quit her agency and the industry, and she moved back in while she tries to find something else to do. Tetsuya has his part-time boss find jobs for both Ippei and Seina. Mai takes Tetsuya to a high-class formal wear restaurant in Tokyo for their date, where she credits him for helping her open up to the other members.
67	5	"Change of Vibes"	February 10, 2014
Yosuke has a date with jyA-Me in Kamakura where he gives her a birthday gift, and later tells Ippei he loves her and suspects she loves him back. Ippei gets a job working with Tetsuya at Kamakura Loco Mart & Garden, while Seina has an interview at a restaurant called Jammin'. Mai makes Tetsuya a bento. Ippei and Magu audition for a comedy show. Current and past house members go to see Dyki's kickboxing retirement ceremony. At dinner after, Yosuke says Hana is most like the type of girl he is interested in out of all the house members, and likewise Hana says Yosuke is most like her type.
68	6	"A Lot of One-Sided Love"	February 17, 2014
Yosuke stresses over picking between jyA-Me or Hana, despite knowing he is closer to jyA-Me, whom he thinks sees him as her unofficial boyfriend. Seina has her first day of work at the restaurant. Ippei and Magu have a show at Shibuya La.mama which Tetsuya, Yosuke and Chie attend. Ippei asks Chie out for drinks afterwards. Masato asks to meet up with Tetsuya to tell him he still has feelings for Seina. Seina meets with Hana and tells her all about Yosuke and jyA-Me, with Hana deciding she has to be the one to act first.
69	7	"Who Is His Heart's Desire?"	February 24, 2014
Masato visits Seina at work unannounced, where he tells her he loves her before she abruptly ends the conversation to get back to work. Yosuke is asked out by jyA-Me and spends the night at her place. The girls go out to eat, where Mai reveals she is pursuing Tetsuya again but is convinced she is too late and Chie says she does not have any attraction to Ippei. At the same time, Ippei tells Tetsuya he has lost interest in Chie and might pursue Mai. Yosuke gets asked out by Hana.
70	8	"White & Black Valentine"	March 3, 2014
Yosuke goes out with Hana, but is unable to tell her about jyA-Me. However, he later learns that Hana already knows and is criticized by Mai for not telling her after he slept with jyA-Me. The girls make Valentine's Day chocolate for the guys, with Mai making Tetsuya a special one. Yosuke has his photo exhibit/concert, after which he tells jyA-Me he went out with Hana whom he thinks he is in love with. Yosuke tells jyA-Me that the "I love you." text messages he sends her everyday were lies and that they will not see each other again. Masato arrives at the house unexpectedly to talk to Seina.
71	9	"At a Critical Moment in One's Life"	March 10, 2014
Masato reiterates his feelings to Seina and asks that she give him a chance to make her fall in love with him, to which she says she will think about it. Yosuke reveals to his housemates that he purposely lied to jyA-Me about the texts, which were his real feelings at the time, in order to make her hate him in hopes it would make the breakup easier for her, but they all tell him that was wrong and only made it easier for himself. Yosuke later contacted jyA-Me to tell her the truth. Ippei asks Mai out for food, but she only talks about Tetsuya. Chie learns she will graduate. Yosuke takes Hana out on a nature walk date.
72	10	"Try Two at Once, Get None"	March 17, 2014
Hana confronts Yosuke about jyA-Me after having seen episode 69 of Terrace House. Although Yosuke tells her he was in love with Hana at that time, Hana reveals she already decided it was over between them after seeing the episode. Because Chie will be leaving soon, Tetsuya suggests an overnight trip with all the house members to make memories. Tetsuya and Mai have a photoshoot for An an where they play embracing lovers. Having grown by learning his way of living has been inconsiderate of others, Yosuke feels it is time for him to leave the house.
73	11	"I Don't Wanna Leave"	March 24, 2014
The members secretly plan and surprise Chie with an onsen overnight trip in Itō, Shizuoka. They visit an amusement park before reaching the hotel, where Ippei distracts Chie so the others can make her a photo collage which is given to her as a goodbye gift with a watch. Mai is later shown crying talking to someone on a telephone about wanting to stay with everyone.
74	12	"Overflowing Difference"	March 31, 2014
Chie and Yosuke leave the house, but not before Chie gives everyone a photo album. Mai suddenly reveals that she will also be leaving the following day due to constant requests from her family. After saying goodbye to the others, Mai has Tetsuya drive her to the beach where she confesses her love to him. But Tetsuya turns her down, believing their values to be too drastically different.

=== Season 7 (2014) ===
No. overall	No. in season	Title	Original release date
75	1	"Spring Storm"	April 14, 2014
New members Ryoko, an employee at Sony Music Records, Kenya, a water polo player, and Frances, a half-American painter, move in. Ryoko and Frances both joined Terrace House to make friends as they have none, while Kenya joined to raise the awareness of his sport. The girls cook dinner for everyone.
76	2	"So Cool..., So Cool..."	April 21, 2014
Kenya and Seina go shopping together. Seina and Ryoko both express interest in Kenya. The house throws a birthday party for Seina, with Masato appearing.
77	3	"Trendy Venus"	April 28, 2014
Masato gives Seina a ring and flowers and reiterates his strong feelings for her. Seina confronts him about rumors that he fools around with a lot of other women. Seina tells Masato she will come watch him surf sometime and dismisses him. Frances works on the curriculum for an English class she teaches at a design school in Ebisu. Ryoko recently got a promotion and begins working on visuals for singer Mirei Touyama. Ryoko gives Kenya a present to use on his upcoming three-day training trip. However, he does not take it with him and the other members hide it from Ryoko.
78	4	"I Wanna Be Alone with You"	May 5, 2014
The girls have a night out talking about guys. Kenya returns, learns he forgot to take Ryoko's present with him and apologizes to her. Frances' boyfriend visits the house. Ippei and Magu have a comedy show, but they are disappointed with the result. Frances tells Ippei he should be meeting with Magu everyday to write material. Kenya surprises Ryoko by picking her up from work to go to dinner and plan to go golfing together. Masato invites Seina to watch him surf in the morning on short notice.
79	5	"Face a Crisis"	May 12, 2014
Seina watches Masato surf, after which they go to lunch where he tells her he does not like seeing her drinking all the time with no plan for a career, which causes an argument. But she later tells her housemates he was cool surfing and she forgives him. Kenya goes to China for over a week. Ryoko continues working on visuals for Mirei Touyama, while Frances paints live for an event. Magu unexpectedly visits and accuses Ippei of just enjoying living at Terrace House the past four months and not working hard on their comedy like they planned. Magu proposes that they breakup so he can move back home and take care of his parents.
80	6	"I Wanna Know More About You"	May 19, 2014
Ippei aims to change and show Magu he can live at the house and still work hard. Tetsuya goes surfing with Masato, who tells him he feels like he has done all he can to win Seina. Kenya and Ryoko go on their golf and dinner date, where they each confess they want to get to know each other better.
81	7	"An Omelette, A Banana, and a Skirt"	May 26, 2014
Ryoko cooks Kenya breakfast before he goes on another trip. Seina speculates that it is over between her and Masato after a fight; he told her not to wear a skirt on a planned date because it would "stand out" and brought up his "fans," which she interprets as him caring too much about his image with other girls. Frances goes to Kesennuma to paint a business. Ippei apologizes for being selfish and asks Magu to do one more show, the outcome of which will decide whether they break up their comedy duo. Seina goes out with Masato, who says he was simply concerned someone might see her underwear if she wore a skirt.
82	8	"Work to Live or Live to Work"	June 2, 2014
Ryoko surprises Kenya by picking him up from practice. Tetsuya meets up with Masato, who says he will give up on Seina as he has done everything he could. Ippei and Magu work on material together all night and morning. Frances goes out with her boyfriend, who feels he never gets to see her anymore due to her busy schedule and asks her to slow down. Before Kenya goes to China again for a competition, he tells Ryoko he will have something important to tell her when he returns.
83	9	"And Yet It Moves"	June 9, 2014
Frances and Ryoko help Ippei out by designing flyers for his show. Tetsuya has practice for his play, which is physically demanding with tumbling choreography. The girls tell Seina she needs to settle things with Masato since they both still have feelings for each other.
84	10	"Indefinite Reservation"	June 16, 2014
The members look up the results of Kenya's competition online and learn his team has lost all their matches and must win the next one to stay in the running. Frances helps Ryoko with her work by body painting Mirei Touyama for a music video. Kenya returns and tells Ryoko that he intended to confess his feelings to her, but because his team lost he feels he should focus on improving instead of dating. The girls tell Ryoko she should secretly go to Kenya's upcoming match to surprise him.
85	11	"Last Trendy"	June 23, 2014
Ippei, Seina and Masato go to see Tetsuya in the play Tumbling Final. Masato and Seina go out after, where she ends things by asking him to be her friend. Ryoko secretly watches Kenya's match before surprising him after the win.
86	12	"X-Day"	July 7, 2014
Frances has an interview over Skype for an exhibit in New York. The members go to Ippei and Magu's comedy show. After which, the two comedians decide to stay together as a duo. Ippei informs his housemates that in order to keep the rhythm he and Magu have going, he is thinking of leaving Terrace House.
87	13	"Sun-Tanned Girl"	July 14, 2014
Ippei says goodbye to everyone and leaves the house. Frances tells her boyfriend that she has made lifelong friends at Terrace House, has changed by making time for friends, revealing that she rescheduled a meeting to go to Ippei's show, and thinks it is time for her to leave too. She tells the other members, and leaves the house the next day. The new female member arrives.

=== Season 8 (2014) ===
No. overall	No. in season	Title	Original release date
88	1	"Your Love Is Not Real"	July 21, 2014
New member Michiko, a bikini designer, moves in to Terrace House with the hope that living by the ocean will inspire new designs. Ryoko worries that Michiko and Seina will become close and leave her behind. When asked by Michiko if he likes anyone, Kenya says he is unsure which causes Seina to ask him about Ryoko. Kenya says his feelings for Ryoko have lessened and he needs to make that clearer to her. New male member Daiki, a windsurfer and university student, moves in to the house because it looked fun.
89	2	"True Color Reveals"	July 28, 2014
Daiki tells the guys he likes older women. Kenya tells Ryoko his feelings for her have faded, but she thought things were already over and is offended that he thought she still had feelings for him. The girls go out together and talk about the guys, and both Seina and Michiko are interested in Daiki.
90	3	"Love Square"	August 4, 2014
Tetsuya and Daiki visit Michiko's company booth at an event at Ōsanbashi Pier, and take her to Yosuke's photo exhibit at the same event. After hearing that Daiki and Michiko were getting close earlier, Seina lets Daiki know she said she was most interested in him, which makes him happy. On a guys' night out, Kenya reveals he is already quite interested in Michiko. Seina watches Daiki windsurf. Kenya asks Michiko out to lunch.
91	4	"None of Your Business"	August 11, 2014
Kenya and Michiko go out to lunch. Michiko and Seina confront Ryoko about the distance between her and the others. Although she acknowledges the distance, Ryoko is unwilling to explain it to them. Tetsuya tells Seina and Michiko that not everyone needs to talk about everything and they should stop pushing Ryoko. Kenya and Michiko and Daiki and Seina go separately to see fireworks in Yuigahama. Kenya asks Michiko to go on another date when he returns from training at the end of August, while Daiki tells Seina he is more interested in her than Michiko.
92	5	"Bravery in Vain"	August 18, 2014
Michiko and Daiki go to Yuigahama so she can get design ideas and visit Yosuke, whom they invite to Tetsuya's birthday party. Ryoko tells the other members that although she told everyone including herself that the situation with her, Kenya and Michiko did not hurt her, she suspects it actually did. But she now wishes them the best and will try to get closer to everyone. Kenya gives Michiko a gift, and she starts making him one in return. Daiki asks Seina out on another date that he will plan.
93	6	"Shaking Hands Again"	August 25, 2014
The house has a birthday party for Tetsuya, with Yosuke and Dyki attending. Yosuke advises Kenya as he sees him quickly falling in love with different women just like he himself did in the house. Ryoko and Michiko go to a festival in Kamakura where Seina works a booth for her employer. Michiko gives Kenya the dreamcatcher she made him for his trip to Hungary. Daiki informs Seina that their date will be in Hakone.
94	7	"Nothing Lasts Forever"	September 1, 2014
Daiki and Seina go to Hakone for their day-long date, which includes a gondola ride and an onsen dyed red to look like wine. At dinner, they reassure one another that they have the same amount of interest in each other. The following day Daiki injures himself in a competition, leaving him on crutches. While watching Terrace House episode 91, the members are shocked to learn that the show will be ending in September.
95	8	"A Penultimate Confession of Love"	September 8, 2014
With the show ending and Kenya in Hungary, Michiko gets Ryoko's blessing to strongly pursue him romantically. Having returned, Kenya invites the members to his next match and asks Michiko to stay around a while after. The other members, sans Ryoko, go to Kawaguchi to watch Kenya's match, which his team wins. Afterwards, Kenya confesses his feelings to Michiko.
96	9	"Remain in the House to the End"	September 15, 2014
Acknowledging that their work comes first, Kenya tells Michiko he wants to be in a relationship with her. She agrees, asks him to be her boyfriend, and they kiss. Tetsuya meets with Dyki and talks about what lies for him after Terrace House. Daiki asks Seina on another date. Tetsuya learns from his manager that he has no work lined up for October and his acting career might be over next year. Daiki plans to give Seina a bottle of wine that says "I love you" on it during their date.
97	10	"Leading Actress"	September 22, 2014
The members start packing to leave the house. Daiki takes Seina to an oceanfront restaurant for their date, where he gives her the wine and tells her he wants to be with her. However, although she likes him, Seina asks that he let her think it over for a little. They agree to save the wine for when she is ready. Tetsuya looks for apartments to move into. Seina asks Daiki to Zaimokuza, where she brings the wine and tells him she wants to be with him, before they make out.
98	11	"Bye Bye Terrace House"	September 29, 2014
Because of work, Ryoko says goodbye and is the first to leave the house. The other members clean the house before Kenya and Michiko leave together. Seina asks Daiki to leave so that she can leave with Tetsuya, as they are the two original members. Tetsuya and Seina reminisce and spend another night in the house, before she leaves in the morning while he sleeps. But not before leaving him a photo album with letters from former members. As Tetsuya opens the door to leave after two years at Terrace House, a look of surprise appears on his face. The Terrace House: Closing Door film picks up immediately from this point.

== Other media ==
Two books related to Terrace House: Boys × Girls Next Door were released. Terrace House Inside was published on January 28, 2014 by Fusosha Publishing. Terrace House Premium was published on February 13, 2015 by Ohta Publishing, one day before the Closing Door film opened.

Five albums containing music used in the show were released between 2013 and 2014, some of which include songs by its cast members. Terrace House Covers ~Boys×Girls Love Somebody Songs~ was released on October 16, 2013 and charted at number 165 on the Oricon Albums Chart. Terrace House Tunes was released on May 21, 2014 by Universal Music and reached number 5. The Backgrounds of Terrace House was released on May 28, 2015 by Clutch Records. Terrace House Tunes - We Were Once in Love and Terrace House Tunes - We are Best Friends Forever were both released on October 6, 2014 and reached numbers 9 and 13 on the chart respectively.

Terrace House Covers ~Boys×Girls Love Somebody Songs~
No.	Title	Length
1.	"Boys×Girls Love Reception"
2.	"We Are Never Ever Getting Back Together"
3.	"Bitter Sweet Symphony"
4.	"Dry Your Eyes"
5.	"Fallen"
6.	"What's My Name? Feat. Drake"
7.	"New Day"
8.	"Damaged"
9.	"All For You"
10.	"Falls Apart"
11.	"We Are Young feat. Janelle Monae"
12.	"21st Century Breakdown"
13.	"Chasing Cars"
14.	"Only the Horses"
15.	"Island in the Sun"
16.	"Runaways"
17.	"Everyone's At It"
18.	"Judas"
19.	"One Day"
20.	"If I Ain't Got You"
21.	"Next..."

Terrace House Tunes
No.	Title	Writer(s)	Artist	Length
1.	"We Are Never Ever Getting Back Together"	Swift; Max Martin; Shellback	Taylor Swift	3:12
2.	"Santeria"	Bradley Nowell; Bud Gaugh; Eric Wilson	Sublime	3:03
3.	"Heartbeat"	Xavier Boyer	Tahiti 80	3:26
4.	"Only the Horses"	Jason Sellards; Scott Hoffman; Amanda Ghost; Alex Ridha	Scissor Sisters	3:39
5.	"Life Is Wonderful"	Rickie-G	Rickie-G	5:41
6.	"It Don't Matter"	Frankenreiter	Donavon Frankenreiter	3:06
7.	"Runnin'"	Trevant Hardson; Emandu Wilcox; Derrick Stewart; James Yancey	The Pharcyde	4:59
8.	"I Believe in Miracles"	Mark Capanni	The Jackson Sisters	2:59
9.	"Lights Are Changing"	Nick Saloman	Mary Lou Lord	5:23
10.	"A World of Difference"	Q;indivi	Q;indivi+SU	5:52
11.	"Pictures of You"	Jeff Blue; Kurtis John; Mike Nadeau	The Last Goodnight	3:10
12.	"Island in the Sun"	Rivers Cuomo	Weezer	3:21
13.	"Showdown"	William Adams; Allan Pineda; Jaime Gomez; Stacy Ferguson; Ryan Buendia	The Black Eyed Peas	4:30
14.	"Insomnia"	Takeshi Hosomi	The Hiatus	3:56
15.	"The Last Time"	Swift; Lightbody; Jacknife Lee	Taylor Swift feat. Gary Lightbody	4:58
16.	"We Are Never Getting Back Together" (piano ballad version)	Swift; Martin; Shellback	Taylor Swift	4:46
17.	"Chasing Cars"	Lightbody; Nathan Connolly; Tom Simpson; Paul Wilson; Jonny Quinn	Snow Patrol	4:26
Total length:				1:10:27

The Backgrounds of Terrace House
No.	Title	Length
1.	"Chasing Cars"
2.	"It's Time"
3.	"Bitter Sweet Symphony"
4.	"True Colors"
5.	"We Are Never Ever Getting Back Together"
6.	"What's My Name?"
7.	"Stay"
8.	"She"
9.	"We Are Young"
10.	"Wouldn't It Be Nice"
11.	"Safe and Sound"
12.	"Christmas Lights"
13.	"California"
14.	"Red"
15.	"All For U"
16.	"Blurred Lines"
17.	"The Lazy Song"
18.	"Thank You"
19.	"Wake Me Up"
20.	"Some Nights"

Terrace House Tunes - We Were Once in Love
No.	Title	Artist	Length
1.	"Here and Now feat. Monday Michiru"	Kan Sano
2.	"Love Someone"	Jason Mraz
3.	"All I Want"	Kodaline
4.	"Bara to Rōzu" (薔薇とローズ)	Sakai Yu
5.	"Dry Your Eyes"	The Streets
6.	"Somewhere Only We Know"	Lily Allen
7.	"Magic feat. J. Dash"	Smash Mouth
8.	"If I Knew"	Bruno Mars
9.	"Into the Blue"	Kylie Minogue
10.	"All Through the Night"	Cyndi Lauper
11.	"Built to Last"	Mêlée
12.	"She Wolf (Falling to Pieces) feat. Sia"	David Guetta
13.	"Skinny Love"	Birdy
14.	"California"	Phantom Planet
15.	"Sunday Park"	Yen Town Band
16.	"Fix You"	Coldplay
17.	"Gravity"	Embrace
18.	"Mōichido, Tewotsunagō" (もう一度、手をつなごう)	Yosuke Imai supported by Zushi Three Brothers

Terrace House Tunes - We are Best Friends Forever
No.	Title	Artist	Length
1.	"Sailin'"	Special Others & KJ (from Dragon Ash)
2.	"Hey Dude"	Kula Shaker
3.	"On My Way"	Passion Pit
4.	"No Surprises"	Radiohead
5.	"Kibō no Wadachi" (希望の轍)	Beat Crusaders
6.	"Loop & Loop"	Industrial Salt
7.	"One Day"	Matisyahu
8.	"Time"	Ben Folds
9.	"Sayonara Color" (サヨナラCOLOR)	Super Butter Dog
10.	"Badman"	Natty
11.	"Celebrity Skin"	Hole
12.	"Everyday Sunshine"	Fishbone
13.	"Stepping Stones"	G Love & Special Sauce
14.	"Brand New Me"	Alicia Keys
15.	"Thank You"	Dido
16.	"For the First Time"	The Script
17.	"Shōnan ga Tōku Natte Iku" (湘南が遠くなっていく)	Tavito Nanao
18.	"Kotoba ni Shitainda (Acoustic Mix)" (言葉にしたいんだ (Acoustic Mix))	Rina Sumioka
