= Yuuki Yamamoto (model) =

Japanese fashion model and tarento

- 山本 優希
- Born: 9 February 1987 (age 38); Aichi Prefecture, Japan
- Occupations: Model; tarento
- Modeling information
- Height: 158 cm (5 ft 2 in) (2014)

Yuuki Yamamoto (山本 優希, Yamamoto Yūki; born 9 February 1987, in Nagoya, Aichi prefecture) is a Japanese female fashion model and tarento who is represented with Starray Production.

Her real name is Yuuki Miura (三浦 優希, Miura Yūki; née Yamamoto (山本)). Her husband is actor Riki Miura.

== Biography ==
Yamamoto was born in Nagoya. Her father is chairman of the field manager of Pachinko machine wholesale company Fields, racehorse Casino Drive. Hidetoshi Yamamoto, who is also an owner of Pelusa and others. One of her older brothers is actor Takeshi Yamamoto who is eleven years older than her. She also has another older brother.

After graduating from junior high school, she moved to Tokyo. When she was a high school student she was scouted to the editorial staff of the fashion magazine Ranzuki in front of Shibuya 109 and began making her magazine debut as a model. Her skin colour at that time was darker, in which she was a so-called ganguro gyaru.

After that, when the magazine Jelly launched she currently became an exclusive model since its launch, and made full use of modelling activities. The magazine is often responsible for styles such as "strengthening" and "sexy" mainly. In its separate volume of the magazine Celeb Jelly, she was in charge of the style of "Paris Hilton".

Currently her activities are diverse and have appeared on television programmes, etc.

== Private life ==
Her hobbies are watching K-1 and making sweets. Ballet dancing is her special skill. She participated in the launch party of K-1 where her father's company sponsors a special spot and published numerous pictures with K-1 fighters on her own blog.

On 3 September 2010, she announced her marriage with actor Riki Miura on her blog and she gave birth to the first child on 28 January 2011. On 9 July 2012 she later gave birth to her second child.

== Filmography ==
=== Magazines ===
Title	Publisher	Notes
Ranzuki	Bunkasha	
Jelly	Bunkasha	Exclusive model

=== Television ===
Date	Title	Network
	Bonita! Bonita!! -Nagoya Girls Collection-	TVA
19 Mar 2009	3 Minutes Show!	NBN
22 Nov 2009	K-1 television special	CX
15 Jan 2010	Fa-La-Mo	TVO
	Ogiyahagi no sokosoko Star Golf	TX
20 Jun 2010	Gal Next Lab	KTV
14 Jul 2010	Ichihachi	MBS
21 Jul 2010	Gout Temps Nouveau	KTV
8 Aug 2010	Sunday Japon	TBS
19 Oct 2010	Give Up Jō	NTV
Jul 2011	Nep League	CX
Jul 2011	Oh! Doya Kao Summit	ABC
Mar 2012	Dancing Sanma Palace	NTV
Mar 2013	Majika!? Chō Kanemochi o Botchan Ojōsan vs Chō Binbō Geinin Shōgeki no Shiseikatsu dotchiga Sugo ika Zenbu Mise Gassen SP	CX

=== Advertisements ===
Company	Product
Sanyo	Xati CA8

=== Music videos ===
Artist	Song
C&K	"Dance Man (Wokky Wokky × Boogie Woogie)"
Lady Bird feat. yula.	"Tokyo wa Yoru no Shichiji"

=== DVD ===
Guest participation works

Date	Title	Publisher
May 2008	GRP Presents Beauty Bible	E-Net Frontier

=== Events ===
Years	Title	Notes	Ref.
2006, 2007, 2009	Shibuya Girls Collection		
2009, 2009	Fukuoka Love & Collection		
2008	Nagoya Senpa Girls Collection		
	Osaka GB Strut		
2012	Tokyo Girls Collection	2012 Spring/Summer	

=== Stage ===
Dates	Title	Role	Location	Screenplay	Producer
5–12 Sep 2009	150th Anniversary of Japan-France Exchange Moulin de la Garrett	Anna Hert	Nippon Seinenkan	Daisuke Nishida	
