= Seina Shimabukuro =

Japanese model and reality television star

Seina Shimabukuro (島袋聖南, Shimabukuro Seina; born 4 April 1987) is a Japanese model and reality television star. She has also appeared in film and music videos.

== Works ==
=== Television ===
- Terrace House: Boys × Girls Next Door (2012–2014)
- Hibana: Spark (2016)
- Terrace House: Opening New Doors (2017–18)

=== Films ===
- Terrace House: Closing Door (2015)

=== Books ===
- 島袋聖南スタイルブック『I am SEINA』 (宝島社 2015, ISBN 9784800236807)
