= Reina Triendl =

Austrian-Japanese model, tarento, and actress

- トリンドル 玲奈
- Born: January 23, 1992 (age 34); Vienna, Austria
- Education: Keio University
- Occupations: Model; tarento; actress
- Years active: 2009–present
- Agent: Amuse, Inc.
- Spouse: Naohiro Yamamoto (m. 2024)
- Children: 1
- Website: reina-triendl.jp

Reina Triendl (Japanese: トリンドル 玲奈, Hepburn: Torindoru Reina; German: [ˈrɛɪ̯nɐ triːndl]) is an Austrian-Japanese model, tarento, and actress.

== Early life ==
Reina was born in Vienna, Austria, to a Japanese mother and an Austrian father. She has a younger sister named Luna (ルナ, Runa). They moved multiple times due to her father's work, including to France and the United States, but have been living in Tokyo, Japan since her first year of high school. Reina graduated from International Christian University High School and began attending Keio University. However, due to taking time off for work, she did not graduate until September 2015.

== Career ==
Reina was scouted and began working as a model for Platinum Production in her second year of high school. She was an exclusive model for JJ and Vivi, and is currently exclusive to With.

In 2011, Reina made her singing debut as a featured artist on Rocketman's song "Love Disco".

Reina began acting in 2012 with the TV drama Kuro no Onna Kyōshi. Beginning with season 2 of Terrace House: Boys × Girls Next Door on January 11, 2013, Reina became a studio commentator on the reality television series Terrace House. She has continued this role on each installment of the franchise.

She played the lead role in the 2015 horror film Tag. Her performance earned her the Best Actress Award at the 19th Fantasia International Film Festival in Canada.

At the end of 2021, Reina began starring in Watashitachi Kekkon Shimashita 2, the second season of the Japanese remake of We Got Married, where she was paired with actor Kōdai Asaka. Reina's second photobook, January 2022's Aimai (あいまい), reached fifth place on Oricon's weekly photobook chart.

On November 5, 2024, Reina left Platinum Production and moved to her new agency, Amuse.

== Private life ==
On January 19, 2024, Reina married fellow actor Naohiro Yamamoto. On January 14, 2026, she announced her first pregnancy, and gave birth to her first child on February 22.

== Filmography ==
=== Television ===
Year(s)	Title	Role	Notes	Ref.
2013	Yamada-kun and the Seven Witches	Miyabi Itou		
2014	Lost Days	Rinka Sasaki		

=== Film ===
Year	Title	Role	Notes	Ref.
2026	Mystery Arena	Reika Monteleone		
