= Riho Miaki =

Japanese YouTuber and idol

- 三秋 里歩
- Born: Riho Kotani (小谷 里歩); 24 August 1994 (age 31); Kyoto Prefecture, Japan
- Other name: Ripopo (りぽぽ)
- Occupations: YouTuber; Idol (formerly)
- Years active: 2010–present
- Spouse: SHUN SHUN CLINIC P (m. 2020)
- Children: 1
- Musical career
- Genres: J-pop
- Formerly of: NMB48; AKB48; Yoshimotozaka46

YouTube information
- Channel: Ripopo Channel
- Years active: 2020–present
- Genre: Vlog
- Subscribers: 4.3 thousand
- Views: 181.8 thousand
- Last updated: 17 July 2021

Riho Kotani (小谷 里歩, Kotani Riho; born 24 August 1994 in Kyoto Prefecture), also known by her stage name Riho Miaki (三秋 里歩, Miaki Riho) is a Japanese YouTuber who is a former member of the Japanese idol groups Yoshimotozaka46, NMB48 and AKB48. She is a former member of NMB48's Team N, and a former member of AKB48's Teams A and 4.

== Biography ==
Kotani passed NMB48's 1st generation auditions in September 2010. Her debut was on October 9, 2010. In March 2011, she was selected to Team N. She held a concurrent position with AKB48's Team A from August 2012 to April 2013, before holding another concurrent position in Team 4 from February 2014.

In the 2014 general elections, Kotani ranked for the first time, placing 61st with 12,913 votes.

Kotani's height on her official profile is 149 cm, but she is actually 147 cm. Her future dream is to be someone who appears frequently on variety shows, commercials and information programmes.

On March 26, 2015, it was announced that she would be released from her concurrent position in AKB48.

On February 4, 2016, Kotani graduated from NMB48 Team N and changed her stage name to Riho Miaki (三秋里歩).

On August 20, 2018, she became a starting member of the Sakamichi Series idol group Yoshimotozaka46.

On March 23, 2020, Miaki announced her engagement to fellow Yoshimotozaka46 member SHUN SHUN CLINIC P and departure from Yoshimoto Kogyo, her office at the time. She officially graduated from Yoshimotozaka46 on March 31, 2020.

On June 20, 2020, she opened her YouTube channel.

On November 1, 2020, she married SHUN SHUN CLINIC P, 7 months after the engagement announcement. On February 2, 2022, she announced her first pregnancy. On July 6, she gave birth to a baby girl.

== Discography ==
=== Yoshimotozaka46 singles ===
Year	No.	Title	Role	Notes
2018	1	"Nakasete Kure yo"	B-side	Debut with Yoshimotozaka46. Sang on "Kimi no Kuchibiru o Hanasanai"
2019	2	"Konya wa Eeyan"	B-side	Sang on "Yaruki no Nai Ai o Thank You!"
2019	3	"Funō dewa Irarenai"	A-side	Sang on "Mekkemon". Last single to participate as part of Yoshimotozaka46.

=== NMB48 singles ===
Year	No.	Title	Role	Notes
2011	1	"Zetsumetsu Kurokami Shōjo"	A-side	Debut with NMB48 Team N. Sang on "Seishun no Lap Time", "Mikazuki no Senaka" and "Boku ga Maketa Natsu" with Shirogumi
2011	2	"Oh My God!"	A-side	Sang on "Boku wa Matteru" and "Kesshou" with Shirogumi
2012	3	"Junjō U-19"	A-side	Sang on "Migi e Magare!"
2012	4	"Nagiichi"	A-side	Sang on "Saigo no Catharsis" with Shirogumi
2012	5	"Virginity (song)"	A-side	Sang on "Mōsō Girlfriend" and "Sunahama de Pistol"
2012	6	"Kitagawa Kenji"	A-side	
2013	7	"Bokura no Eureka"	A-side	Sang on "Todokekana Soude Todoku Mono"
2013	8	"Kamonegix"	A-side	
2014	9	"Takane no Ringo"	A-side	
2014	10	"Rashikunai"	A-side	Sang on "Kyusen Kyotei" as Team N.
2015	11	"Don't look back!"	A-side	Sang on "Renai Petenshi" as Team N. Sang on "Sotsugyō Ryokō" as NMB48's 1st generation.
2015	12	"Durian Shōnen"	A-side	Sang on "Inochi no Heso" as Team N.
2015	13	"Must be now"	B-side	Did not sing on title track; Sang on "Yume ni Iro ga nai riyū" as Team N, "Kataomoi Yori mo Omoide wo..." and "Orera to wa". Last single to participate as part of NMB48.

=== AKB48 singles ===
Year	No.	Title	Role	Notes
2012	27	"Gingham Check"	B-side	Sang on "Ano Hi no Fuurin"
2012	28	"Uza"	B-side	Sang on "Kodoku na Hoshizora".
2012	29	"Eien Pressure"	B-side	Sang on "HA!"
2013	30	"So Long!"	B-side	Sang on "Ruby".
2013	31	"Sayonara Crawl"	B-side	Sang on "Ikiru Koto"
2013	34	"Suzukake no Ki no Michi de "Kimi no Hohoemi o Yume ni Miru" to Itte Shimattara Bokutachi no Kankei wa Dō Kawatte Shimau no ka, Bokunari ni Nan-nichi ka Kangaeta Ue de no Yaya Kihazukashii Ketsuron no Yō na Mono"	B-side	Sang on "Kimi to Deatte Boku wa Kawatta"
2014	35	"Mae Shika Mukanee"	B-side	Sang on "KONJO"
2014	36	"Labrador Retriever"	B-side	Sang on "Heart no Dasshutsu Game"
2014	37	"Kokoro no Placard"	B-side	Ranked 61st in 2014 General Election. Sang on "Seikaku ga Warui Onna no Ko"
2014	38	"Kibouteki Refrain"	B-side	Sang on "Utaitai" and "Me ga Aketa Mama no First Kiss"
2015	39	"Green Flash"	B-side	Sang on "Punkish"

== Appearances ==
=== Movies ===
- NMB48 Geinin! The Movie Owarai Seishun Girls! (2013)
- NMB48 Geinin! The Movie Returns Sotsugyō! Owarai Seishun Girls!! Aratanaru Tabidachi (2014)
