= Yoshimotozaka46 =

Japanese co-ed idol group

Background information
- Origin: Osaka, Japan
- Genres: J-pop
- Years active: 2018–2022
- Labels: Yoshimoto Kogyo; Sony
- Member of: Sakamichi Series
- Members: See members
- Website: www.yoshimotozaka46.com

Yoshimotozaka46 (吉本坂46; Yoshimotozaka Fōtīshikkusu) is a Japanese co-ed idol group produced by Yasushi Akimoto. It was created on February 21, 2018. It is Nogizaka46's second sister group, after Keyakizaka46 (now split between Sakurazaka46 and Hinatazaka46). This was named after the Osaka-based entertainment company, Yoshimoto Kogyo Holdings.

== History ==
On February 21, 2018, the Sakamichi Series wanted to make a third overall group that will change idol history, with its unisex concept that fits all genders and ages with not just only the usual musical acts, but also with Owarai comedy concept.

The Japanese version of Men in Black: International uses a song by them, titled "Konya wa Eeyan".

On October 29, 2021, it was announced the group would go on hiatus after a concert at Zepp Haneda on February 5, 2022.

== Members ==
=== Generation 1 ===
| Name | Affiliated Unit | Birth date (age) | Prefecture of origin | Notes |
|---|---|---|---|---|
| Anon | | – | Fukuoka | |
| Naoto Ikeda | Rainbow | September 19, 1993 (age 32) | Osaka | |
| Yoshimasa Iwahashi | Plus Minus | August 12, 1978 (age 47) | Osaka | |
| Kazuhiro Unagi | Ginshari | August 31, 1983 (age 42) | Osaka | |
| Masahiko Ehara | | May 29, 1982 (age 43) | Osaka | |
| Shozo Endo | Cocorico | July 13, 1971 (age 54) | Osaka | |
| Shizuka Ohki | | February 14 | Tokushima | |
| Yōsuke Ōchi | Dienoji | July 13, 1972 (age 53) | Oita | |
| Takahiro Ogata | Panther | April 27, 1977 (age 48) | Miyagi | |
| Haruna Ogawa | Spike | February 7, 1990 (age 35) | Aichi | |
| Otake | Jungle Pocket | December 2, 1982 (age 42) | Tokyo | |
| Obata no Onīsan | | June 5, 1988 (age 37) | Niigata | |
| Satoshi Kanada | Hannya | February 6, 1986 (age 39) | Aichi | |
| Akiyoshi Kawashima | Hannya | January 20, 1982 (age 43) | Tokyo | |
| Kyon | Cotton | November 18, 1987 (age 37) | Saitama | |
| Ken | Mizutama Repputai | August 22, 1969 (age 56) | Nara | |
| Koide | Shampoo Hat | February 1, 1976 (age 49) | Osaka | |
| Junichi Kōmoto | Jichō Kachō | April 7, 1975 (age 50) | Okayama | Captain |
| Mari Kotera | Yoshimoto Shinkigeki | August 31, 1991 (age 34) | Osaka | |
| Tsukasa Saito | Trendy Angel | February 15, 1979 (age 46) | Kanagawa | |
| Tetsuji Sakakibara | | December 6, 1989 (age 35) | Aichi | |
| Sayuri | Katsumi Sayuri | July 15, 1969 (age 56) | Hyogo | |
| Tamayo Shimada | Yoshimoto Shinkigeki | May 10, 1970 (age 55) | Osaka | |
| Shuho | | July 28, 1980 (age 45) | Iwate | |
| Shunshun Clinic P | | July 2, 1983 (age 42) | Gunma | |
| Takashi | Trendy Angel | January 30, 1986 (age 39) | Tokyo | |
| Tomohiro Tada | Totto | January 9, 1986 (age 39) | Osaka | |
| Single Tanaka | 8.6byo Bazooka | February 26, 1991 (age 34) | Osaka | |
| Takeshi Nadagi | | October 9, 1970 (age 55) | Osaka | |
| Shinji Nishimura | Cotton | June 30, 1984 (age 41) | Hiroshima | |
| Hideboh | | October 7, 1967 (age 58) | Tokyo | |
| Hinata | | October 6, 1991 (age 34) | Osaka | |
| Nao Fujii | | November 6, 2001 (age 23) | Hiroshima | Youngest |
| Masaruko | | February 11 | Osaka | |
| Machaaki | Egu-Splosion | October 9, 1981 (age 44) | Yamaguchi | |
| Shiho Matsuura | Spike | June 13, 1984 (age 41) | Yamagata | |
| Mahiru | Ganbareruya | August 30, 1993 (age 32) | Tottori | |
| Shōji Murakami | | May 28, 1955 (age 70) | Ehime | Oldest |
| Masumi Yagi | Savanna | August 4, 1974 (age 51) | Kyoto | |
| Keiichi Yamamoto | Gokuraku Tombo | February 23, 1968 (age 57) | Hiroshima | |
| Yuriyan Retriever | | November 1, 1990 (age 34) | Nara | |
| Yoshiko | Ganbareruya | October 24, 1990 (age 35) | Aichi | |

=== Generation 2 ===
- Tokio Uenishi
- Asami Osako
- Yoshio Obara
- Hayate Kajiwara
- Madoka Kabasawa
- Kosuke Kikuchi
- Miyu Kihara
- Junichi Sakamoto
- Masafumi Satake
- Sota Yamamoto
- Kazushi Toguchi
- Tojima Repeat
- Hirota Hara
- Ruruka Higa
- Renge Fujimori
- Keiko Matsuura
- Maruirui
- Kana Minosako
- Rossy

=== Former members ===
| Name | Affiliated Unit | Birth date (age) | Prefecture of origin | Graduation date | Notes |
|---|---|---|---|---|---|
| Naoko Nozawa | | March 29, 1963 (age 62) | Tokyo | August 18, 2019 | Gen 1 |
| Riho Miaki | | August 21, 1994 (age 26) | Kyoto | March 31, 2020 | Gen 1 Former NMB48 / AKB48 |
| TAK | | April 23, 2002 (age 19) | Hyogo | March 31, 2021 | Gen 2 |
| Hinana Okahata | | January 3, 2003 (age 18) | Osaka | September 9, 2021 | Gen 2 |
| Yui Takano | | December 6, 1993 (age 31) | Osaka | October 1, 2021 | Gen 1 Former NMB48 |

== Discography ==
=== Studio albums ===
| No. | Title | Release date | Peak chart positions | | Sales (Oricon) | | Sales (Billboard Japan) |
| No. | Title | Release date | JPN Oricon | JPN Hot Albums | First week | Total | Sales (Billboard Japan) |
|---|---|---|---|---|---|---|---|
| 1 | That's Life: Sore mo Jinsei Jan (That's Life 〜それも人生じゃん〜) | February 2, 2022 | 22 | 30 | 2,766 | TBA | TBA |

=== Singles ===
| No. | Title | Release date | Peak chart positions | | Sales (Oricon) | | Sales (Billboard Japan) |
| No. | Title | Release date | JPN Oricon | JPN Hot 100 | First week | Total | Sales (Billboard Japan) |
|---|---|---|---|---|---|---|---|
| 1 | "Nakasete Kure yo" (泣かせてくれよ) | December 26, 2018 | 3 | 18 | 15,122 | 18,304 | 28,969 |
| 2 | "Konya wa Eeyan" (今夜はええやん) | May 8, 2019 | 3 | 18 | 16,770 | | |
| 3 | "Funō dewa Irarenai" (不能ではいられない) | December 25, 2019 | 3 | 15 | | | |
