= Ryuichi Kosugi =

Japanese comedian (born 1973)

- 小杉 竜一
- Born: 5 July 1973 (age 52); Ukyō-ku (now Nishikyō-ku), Kyoto, Japan
- Other names: Kossū (こっすー); Hira-Par Nīsan (ひらパー兄さん, Hira-Pā Nīsan)
- Education: Kyoto Prefectural Katsura High School; NSC Osaka 13th Year
- Years active: 1995–present
- Agent: Yoshimoto Creative Agency
- Style: Manzai
- Partner: Takashi Yoshida

Ryuichi Kosugi (小杉 竜一, Kosugi Ryūichi; born 5 July 1973, in Kyoto) is a Japanese comedian who performs tsukkomi in the comedy duo Black Mayonnaise. His standing position is on the left. His partner is Takashi Yoshida.

Kosugi is represented with Yoshimoto Kogyo. He graduated from Kyoto Prefectural Katsura High School. On 12 November 2010 Kosugi married a former dental assistant from Osaka Prefecture.

== Filmography ==
=== TV programmes ===
Year	Title	Notes	Ref.
2009–present	Honmadekka!? TV		
2009–2016	BlaMayo to Yukai na Nakama tachi: Atsuatsu!		
2010–present	Uramayo		
2013–2021	MurakamiMayonnaise no Tsukkomasete itadakimasu!		
2015–2019	Mayonaka Geinin		
2016	Tatakae! Sports Naikaku	Regular secretary	

=== Television drama ===
Year	Title	Role	Notes	Ref.
2020–2023	Isekai Izakaya "Nobu"	Frank	3 seasons	

=== Films ===
Year	Title	Role	Notes	Ref.
2025	Dive in Wonderland	Humpty Dumpty (voice)		

=== Japanese dub ===
Year	Title	Role	Dub for	Notes	Ref.
2015	Ant-Man	Luis	Michael Peña		
2018	Ant-Man and the Wasp	Luis	Michael Peña		

== Bibliography ==
Year	Title	Code
2009	Usuge no Hinkaku	ISBN 4847018222
