= Kotoge =

Kotoge (written: 小峠) is a Japanese surname. Notable people with the surname include:

- Atsushi Kotoge (born 1985), Japanese professional wrestler
- Eiji Kotoge, Japanese comedian from the comedy duo Viking
