= Exit (comedy duo) =

Japanese comedy duo

Exit (Japanese reading: イグジット, Igujitto), stylized in all-caps as EXIT are a Japanese owarai (comedy) duo consisting of Rintarō and Daiki Kanechika, formed in December 2017. The duo is affiliated with Yoshimoto Kogyo.

Currently, they are mainly active in Yoshimoto Mugendai Hall. The duo also has a YouTube channel called Exit Charannel. As of April 2021, the channel has 722,000 subscribers.

== History ==
After disbanding Bebī Gyangu (ベイビーギャング), Rintarō was active as a comedian in onē mandan (drag queen comic monologue). The duo was formed when Daiki Kanechika, who had previously been in the group Purizun (ぷりずん。), called him out. Originally they were a duo formed to participate in the M-1 Grand Prix. The two participated in the M-1 Grand Prix 2017 as a temporary duo called Scandal and advanced to the third round. In December 2017, they officially formed the owarai duo called Exit. The origin of the name was explained on Exit's Twitter as, "I hope we can be the exit to everyone's pain and stress."

In July 2018, Exit was ranked number one in "Young entertainers who are likely to sell in the current variety" category on TV Tokyo's variety show Goddotan.

On November 11, 2018, Exit sold out a solo live performance at Yoshimoto Mugendai Hall. In December 2018, Exit Charannel was begun and videos were scheduled to be uploaded every Tuesday, Friday and Sunday. On November 11, 2018, EXIT sold out a solo live performance at Lumine the Yoshimoto.

The duo was promoted to first class at Yoshimoto Mugendai Hall at Faseka ∞ Change on December 23, 2018.

On February 2, 2019, Exit held a bus tour with HoriPro com's fellow owarai duo Kitsune. In August 2019 the two held a cruising event.

On December 25, 2019, the duo released their first live DVD Exit hatsu rainichi chara manji baibusu buchiage japan tsuā hikari × hikari sore sunawachi oto ninarikeri 〜 osoku nattenjan 〜☆hikaeme ni itte Pa ripi zen'in ni todoku yō ni achāna nedan de here we go☆ which was recorded at Japan Tour on September 27 of the same year.

On December 28, 2019, the duo's first own TV show Exido was broadcast on TV Asahi.

On December 29, 2019, Exit held a solo live performance Exit wo mitai subete no hito yo. Mite kurēn shageki kimi no hāto o uchinuki machupichu kūchū toshi raivu 〜Reiwa saisho no Shon Ten ito agarikeri! Tomoni jidai o kaerunari yo Fes. Kotoshi mo senki ~yusu rainen mo yorota no forever in Pacifico Yokohama〜 at Pacifico Yokohama with an audience of 5,000.

When the duo made a remote guest appearance on Fuji TV's KinKi Kids no Bunbun Būn broadcast on August 21, 2020, the tentative title of KinKi Kids's 2nd single Aisareruyori Aishitai was "Exit". From this, an unexpected connection to KinKi Kids was found in the origin of the duo's name.

On 23 Nov 2020, Exit has gained "Best comedy duo of the Year" award for GQ Japan Men of the Year.

== Members ==
=== Rintarō (りんたろー。) ===
Rintarō was born Rintarō Nakajima in Hamamatsu, Shizuoka Prefecture on March 6, 1986. He is in charge of tsukkomi and creating neta (ideas).

=== Daiki Kanechika (兼近 大樹) ===
Daiki Kanechika was born in Kita-ku, Sapporo, Hokkaido on May 11, 1991. He is in charge of boke. He has been nicknamed Kanechī (かねちー).

In 2019, Bunshun published information on Kanechika's arrest in 2011 on suspicion of mediating the prostitution of a high school girl. Following the publication, Kanechika conducted a public apology and stated "I will forever carry this on my back" but also stated "Because of who I am [and what I have done], I think there are many things that I can do, and want to show and tell". The same day, his partner Rintarō apologized to the fans and said "As long as there are people who support us, we would like to continue to entertain with laughter."
