= Akiba Maid War =

Japanese anime television series

- Key visual

アキバ冥途戦争 (Akiba Meido Sensō)
- Genre: Black comedy; Girls with guns; Yakuza
- Anime television series
- Directed by: Sōichi Masui
- Written by: Yoshihiro Hiki
- Music by: Yoshihiro Ike
- Studio: P.A. Works
- Licensed by: NA: Sentai Filmworks; UK: Anime Limited; EU/IN: Crunchyroll
- Original network: Tokyo MX, BS11, KBS Kyoto, SUN
- Original run: October 7, 2022 – December 23, 2022
- Episodes: 12
- icon

Akiba Maid War (Japanese: アキバ冥途戦争, Hepburn: Akiba Meido Sensō) is an original Japanese anime television series produced by Cygames and P.A. Works. It was directed by Sōichi Masui and written by Yoshihiro Hiki, and features character designs by Manabu Nii and music by Yoshihiro Ike. The series is set in Akihabara in 1999 and follows Nagomi Wahira, a young woman who joins a pig-themed maid café only to discover the cutthroat nature of the business. It aired from October to December 2022 on Tokyo MX, BS11, KBS Kyoto, and SUN. (Note: Tokyo MX listed the series premiere at 24:00 JST on October 6, 2022, which is effectively October 7 at midnight.) Sentai Filmworks licensed the series, and is available for streaming on Hidive. Crunchyroll streamed the series in Europe and India.

== Plot ==
In Akihabara in 1999, a 17-year-old girl named Nagomi Wahira begins her new job working at a pig-themed maid café, trying to follow her dream of being a cheerful and hardworking maid. However, Nagomi soon finds the world of maid cafés in Akihabara is a lot more cutthroat than she anticipated at first.

== Characters ==
Nagomi Wahira (和平 なごみ, Wahira Nagomi)
Voiced by: Reina Kondō (Japanese); Alyssa Marek (English)
Portrayed by: Hinata Satō
A fresh-faced 17-year-old girl who moves to Akiba to become a maid café waitress after seeing a flier from the Oinky Doink Cafe. Despite her initial enthusiasm, Nagomi quickly becomes disillusioned when she gets dragged into the schemes of the café and her manager as she begins to learn the hard reality of being a maid. At the end of the series, she becomes disabled, but she continues working as a maid as of 2018.
Ranko Mannen (万年 嵐子, Mannen Ranko)
Voiced by: Rina Satō (Japanese); Chaney Moore (English)
Portrayed by: Hotaru Nomoto
A 35-year-old woman with a stern, professional demeanor at all times, whether serving patrons at the cafe or gunning down rival maids. Despite being introduced as a rookie at the Oinky Doink Cafe, Ranko has a history in the world of the Akiba Maids stretching back over a decade. She previously spent some time in prison. She is later killed while shopping with Nagomi.
Yumechi (ゆめち)
Voiced by: Minami Tanaka (Japanese); Cat Thomas (English)
Portrayed by: Marina Nagasawa
One of the veteran maids at the Oinky Doink Cafe, with a small but dedicated following, able to read other people and turn on her charm as needed. Her real name is Yume Hiiragi (柊 結夢, Hīragi Yume).
Shiipon (しぃぽん)
Voiced by: Tomoyo Kurosawa (Japanese); Christina Kelly (English)
Portrayed by: Rina Hashimoto
A tanned gyaru and another veteran maid at the Oinky Doink Cafe. Her real name is Shino Goto (後藤 志乃, Gotō Shino).
Zoya (ゾーヤ)
Voiced by: Jenya (Japanese); Katelyn Barr (English)
Portrayed by: Asana Mamoru
A new maid in Oinky Doink Cafe. Growing up in the former Soviet Union, she was forbidden to touch and play with cute things by her strict parents. She becomes a maid in Japan following the collapse of the Soviet Union but struggles to cope with life in Japan before meeting Ranko. As she still struggles with the Japanese language she often speaks in Russian.
Yasuko Yaegashi (八重樫 靖子, Yaegashi Yasuko)
Voiced by: Ayahi Takagaki (Japanese); Teresa Zimmerman (English)
Portrayed by: Miyuki Torii
The manager of the Oinky Doink Cafe. Her bad money management puts her in debt to the Creatureland group, and her schemes to get out of debt make things worse.
Okachimachi (御徒町)
Voiced by: Aya Hirano (Japanese); Luci Christian (English)
The mascot of the Oinky Doink Cafe, despite being a panda instead of a pig. Okachimachi does support the other cafe members as needed. Her identity is later revealed to be the maid who shot Michiyo (Ranko's former employer) on the orders of Nagi. She later impales Nagi to death after the latter is shot.
Nerula (ねるら, Nerura)
Voiced by: Manaka Iwami (Japanese); Annie Wild (English)
A maid working in the Invader Café Destron, which is owned by Oinky Donk's business rival Maidalien, which allows her to have some knowledge about the yakuza-like business of the maids. Despite this, she and Nagomi become friends and later sworn sisters. She is later murdered for trying to undermine Maidalien's attempt to wage war against its rivals, which deeply traumatizes Nagomi.
Debt Collector (取り立て屋, Toritateya)
Voiced by: Koki Uchiyama (Japanese); Jack Stansbury (English)
Portrayed by: Sōichirō Sorihashi
A hard-boiled man dressed like a stereotypical otaku who serves as the middleman for the Creatureland group and the various maid cafes in Akihabara under its umbrella. He is murdered by Nagi after the Oinky Donk Cafe wins the Lady Omoe Festival.
Nagi (凪)
Voiced by: Junko Minagawa
The leader of Creatureland group, she was once a maid at Michiyo's Maid Teahouse named Uzuko and the sworn sister of Ranko.

== Media ==
=== Anime ===
==== Episodes ====
No.	Title (Note: All English titles are taken from Hidive.)	Directed by	Written by	Storyboarded by	Original release date
1	"Oink It Up! Starting Today, You're an Akiba Maid!"; Transliteration: "Buhire! Kyō kara Akiba no Shinjin Meido!" (Japanese: ブヒれ！今日からアキバの新人メイド！)	Tomoaki Ōta	Yoshihiro Hiki	Sōichi Masui	October 7, 2022
In 1985, an older maid is walking into a teahouse in Akihabara when she is gunned down by a rival maid. 14 years later, Akihabara is covered by multiple different maid cafes as a girl named Nagomi Wahira prepares to begin her new job working for the "Oinky Doink Cafe", a pigsty-themed maid cafe. Nagomi is quickly pressed into service along with the stern yet professional 35 year old Ranko Mannen as new maids that same day. Despite their enthusiasm for the job, their lack of experience creates problems for the other maids. Suddenly, a hard-boiled otaku shows up, threatening the manager of the cafe for not paying her dues to his organization, "Creatureland". Looking for a way out, the manager offers Nagomi to handle "the Wuv-Wuv Moonbeam issue", tasking her with hand-delivering a letter to the rival maid cafe. Before that, the manager gives some money for the ramen shop owner downstairs, and allows Ranko to go with Nagomi. After eating some ramen, the two girls head over to Wuv-Wuv Moonbeam, and find out that the letter was actually a provocation to attack. Ranko shoots the head maid of Wuv-Wuv Moonbeam with a gun she got from the ramen chef, and then kills the rest of the rival cafe's maids while fleeing with Nagomi. The two eventually return to the pigsty cafe. Nagomi, traumatized from the events of the night, plans to flee, but is stuck when Ranko locks the door to her bedroom and announces that they are roommates.
2	"Gambling Adoracalypse: Yumechi"; Transliteration: "Tobaku Moe Kyun-roku Yumechi" (Japanese: 賭博萌キュン録 ゆめち)	Noriyoshi Sasaki	Saji Komori	Sōichi Masui	October 14, 2022
While Nagomi tries to process the events of the previous night, the Oinky Doink manager is forced to serve as a golf tee by the Creatureland representative for not paying her dues and ruining his original plan for Wuv-Wuv Moonbeam. In dire need of cash, the manager visits a loan shark, who makes her give him the Oinky Doink Cafe as collateral, then convinces her to gamble the loaned money at the Maid Casino, where she loses it all. The manager announces that she is closing shop, but after realizing there is cash left in the register, decides to take the maids with her back to the Maid Casino to try and gamble their way back into the black. Most of the crew ends up losing money at various games, when the head maid from the Casino offers to let them buy in at "Moe Moe Poker" where she acts as the dealer, as long as they are willing to put their own futures on the line. One by one, the Oinky Doink crew loses and ends up in a cage. Yumechi figures out that the dealer and another player at the table are cheating to rig the game in their favor, but she still loses. The loan shark from before comes to gloat at the manager and the Oinky Doink maids, when Ranko shoots him with a hidden gun, freeing her colleagues and sparking another gunfight. The casino is then destroyed by a grenade setting off a gas explosion as the Oinky Doink crew escape back to their cafe.
3	"The Worth of a Maid's Fist and Pancreas!"; Transliteration: "Meido no Kobushi, Suizō no Kachi wa" (Japanese: メイドの拳、膵臓の価値は)	Mitsutaka Noshitani	Katsurō Hidaka	Masakazu Hashimoto	October 21, 2022
A figurine seller named Kijima is in town to sell a replica of a rare anime figure to a woman named Taira. Meanwhile, the Creatureland representative decides to enter Ranko in a rigged fighting match at the "Akiba Fluffy & Sweet Club", owned by Taira, to make up for the cafe's debt. As the rest of the maids act as cornermen, the manager promises Taira that Ranko will throw the fight in the third round. However, as Taira is about to buy the figurine, Ranko wins the fight with her first punch, leading Taira to shoot Kijima in anger. The manager keeps herself alive by swearing that Ranko will fight her way to the finals and then take a dive in the last round. Taira introduces her ringer, a Russian woman that Ranko met earlier who said that Ranko was not cute enough to be a maid, while Ranko responds that just wearing the uniform is enough. Taira then tells Ranko to dispose of Kijima's body, and lets her make her way to the finals. Meanwhile, the Cafe Manager and Shiipon take out loans to bet on Ranko while offering their organs as collateral. In the finals, Ranko plays defense for 11 rounds, but is angered by the Russian's insults about her not being a real maid, as the Russian's own monologue reveals that she wished to be a maid but was only allowed to study non-cute pursuits and could not smile, ruining her trial at an Akiba Maid Cafe before becoming a hitwoman under Taira. Ranko then defeats the Russian in round 12. Before Taira can get her revenge, Kijima's men find Ranko's note to Taira that reveals her as the real killer, sparking a fight between the two sides. Yumechi finds the real figurine in Ranko's bag that she took from Kijima's corpse, and sells it to help the manager break even with the organ sellers. The next day, the cafe gains a new maid: Zoya, the Russian that Ranko fought in the ring.
4	"The Inside Story! A Drillmaster for the Swine!!"; Transliteration: "Jitsuroku! Buta no Chōkyōshi da bū!!" (Japanese: 実録！豚の調教師だブー‼)	Tetsuo Ichimura	Yoshihiro Hiki	Sōichi Masui	October 28, 2022
The head of Creatureland executes a traitor in her organization on stage, then later sends out trainers to each maid cafe. Oinky Doink Cafe is visited by Sano, who kicks out the Manager and Okachimachi before setting a brutal new regimen for the maids in the cafe. Sano spends several days delivering physical and emotional abuse, forcing the maids into struggle sessions, tasking them with carving a large monument to Creatureland on the roof, and demanding they each earn at least 100,000 Yen in sales by the end of the week. Shiipon tries to lead a revolt against Sano, but Sano instead turns the other maids against her. Shiipon then tries to run away, and is even assisted by Ranko, but after seeing the deposed Manager and Okachimachi rooting through the cafe's garbage for food, Shiipon decides to stay and puts on different makeup that Sano approves of. At the end of the week, Sano leaves the cafe. However, the Manager returns to the cafe with Okachimachi and a bazooka, assisted by Shiipon and Ranko. The cafe workers fight amongst themselves until Shiipon destroys the Creatureland symbol with the bazooka, reminding her friends that they became maids for fun, not for profit. A few days later, Sano returns to the Oinky Doink cafe to find everything has reverted to before. She then flees, fearing the wrath of her boss, while Nagomi shows off her skills to the visiting ramen chef.
5	"Drowning in Red! A 36th Birthday Celebration!"; Transliteration: "Aka ni Shizumu! Sanjūroku-sai Seitansai!" (Japanese: 赤に沈む！三十六歳生誕祭！)	Tomoaki Ōta	Katsurō Hidaka	Jong Heo	November 4, 2022
With Oinky Doink Cafe in dire need of funds to pay the interest on the Manager's debt, Nagomi gets the idea from Nerula to hold a celebration for Ranko's 36th birthday. However, the other cafe staff shoots down the idea. Even so, Ranko and Nagomi work on making a birthday event, and try going to Creatureland affiliate, Cafe Sheep, to get some customers. However, after being insulted by the maid Kaoruko and her clientele, Ranko and Nagomi leave. Ranko flashes back to her old job in 1985, when she was working in a teahouse and had a code of nonviolence. Suddenly, Kaoruko and a few sheep maids attack, and Kaoruko takes Nagomi hostage, forcing both her and Ranko into a giant barrel where she plans to drown them both for their overlapping birthday event. As the barrel fills with tomato juice, Ranko tells Nagomi that she spent time in "the joint" for her actions 14 years ago, and was happy that Nagomi tried to plan a birthday party for her. At the last second, the other Oinky Doink maids follow a hint from Okachimachi to Cafe Sheep and free the two from their captivity, fighting their way through the sheep maids. The group then unveils their surprise party for Ranko, despite having no other customers, while Okachimachi hands the Manager the full cash box from Cafe Sheep.
6	"Blood in a Sisterly Troth and the Menace of the Red Bat"; Transliteration: "Shimai Sakazuki ni Sosogu Chi Aka Batto no Kyōkō" (Japanese: 姉妹盃に注ぐ血 赤バットの凶行)	Kiyoshi Murayama	Yōko Yonaiyama	Jong Heo	November 11, 2022
Manami Yamagishi, a legendary Maid known as the "Crimson Supernova", is released from prison and escorted to the Maidalien group's HQ. After calling Maidalien's current leader soft for letting Wuv-Wuv Moonbeam get wiped out, she takes over the group herself. Meanwhile, Nagi and the Debt Collector issue an ultimatum to the Oinky Doink Manager to deal with Maidalien's leader or they will destroy her cafe themselves. When the Manager calls a staff meeting to inform them of the news, Ranko and Zoya suggest assassinating Maidalien's leader, as all other alternatives would lead to their deaths. However, Nagomi does not want to fight, fearing that a war would make her have to hurt Nerula. The Manager suggests a formal sisterhood bond, and with the ramen chef's help, the two become sisters. The next day, Nerula hears orders go out from Manami to all Maidalien maid cafes to destroy Oinky Doink Cafe. Nerula tries to hold them off by slipping Nagomi a warning and tipping off a local policeman, but Manami and her aide Miyabi bribe the cop, and hunt down Nerula soon after finding out she was the mole. The two find her hiding spot about the same time as Nagomi and Ranko. Nerula takes responsibility for her actions and tries to kill Manami, but is beaten and then gunned down in front of Nagomi. The Maidaliens then flee from approaching police, as Nagomi hears Nerula's dying words.
7	"Creature Gang War Chronicles: The Bloody Extra-Akiba Terrestrial Showdown!"; Transliteration: "Kedamono Kōsō-shi! Akiba-gai Seimei-tai Kessen!!" (Japanese: 獣抗争史！秋葉外生命体血戦！！)	Tatsuya Sasaki	Yōko Yonaiyama	Noriyoshi Sasaki Sōichi Masui	November 18, 2022
One week after Nerula's murder, Nagomi has gone missing from Oinky Doink Cafe. Ranko finds out that Nagomi has started working at a ninja-themed cafe instead, hoping to hide from the maid violence. However, Nagomi soon regrets her decision after hearing from some of Nerula's regulars how much Nerula praised Nagomi before her death. After talking with the Ramen chef, Nagomi decides to use the ninja techniques she learned. Some time later, Manami takes a sizable crew of Maidaliens with her to finish off Oinky Doink Cafe. Despite Ranko, Zoya, and Yumechi's tactics, the numbers are not in their favor. However, Nagomi appears in her ninja outfit, using smoke bombs and kunai to ambush the enemy maids and even the odds. Manami is dragged away from the fight by Miyabi, but when Manami calls for reinforcements, she discovers that the leadership of Maidalien are entering a pact with Creatureland to cease all hostilities while hoping Manami's soldiers and Oinky Doink's staff kill each other. Ranko and Nagomi track the wounded Manami to a nearby park, but Nagomi refuses to kill Manami, delivering a heavy slap instead and demanding she live on as a maid. Manami limps back to Maidalien HQ, where the executives all gun her down. A narrator then remarks that with Manami gone, Creatureland has no one to stop them from absorbing all of Maidalien into their organization, as Nagi mutters that the pigsty should have died that day.
8	"A Blood-soaked Ballgame: The Kyun of Victory Shines On You"; Transliteration: "Senketsu ni Somaru Hakkyū Eikō wa Kimi ni Kagaya-kyun" (Japanese: 鮮血に染まる白球 栄光は君に輝キュン♡)	Noriyoshi Sasaki	Katsurō Hidaka	Jun'ichi Sakata	November 25, 2022
After being absorbed into Creatureland, the Maidaliens were rebranded into an Axolotl-themed maid cafe. As they hold a funeral for Manami, the Oinky Doink Manager comes to pay her respects with the Debt Collector, but ends up angering them. Nagi orders both sides to settle their grievances with a game of baseball. Nagomi is elated that the maids can engage in a peaceful match, but with the cafe short of the minimum number of players for baseball, the Manager is forced to hire three Venezuelans (José, Luis, Antonio) to fill out her side. The Oinky Doink team gets off to a hot start, though the Venezuelans turn out to not be ballplayers but tourists in Akihabara at the time. With her team behind, Ginko orders her team to start cheating, and one of the Axolotl maids hits Nagomi with the bat. The game soon turns into a brawl, despite Nagomi's efforts to focus on the baseball game itself. However, a couple of Axolotl maids grow impressed with her resolve, and start ignoring their manager's cries. Ginko herself decides to step in and attack Ranko with a bat, but is knocked down by Zoya. Suddenly, Ginko is backstabbed by her own Axolotl mascot, who turns out to be Miyabi, shortly before getting stabbed with her own dagger. However, the Axolotl team decides to pretend they are still alive to finish the game, which Ranko wins with a final strikeout. After the game, Ranko meets with Nagi, recognizing her as her sworn sister Uzuko from 15 years ago. Nagi tells her that she should have fought for their mistress in the past, and now must fight for Creatureland.
9	"Akiba Creatures Go Wild! Let the Moe Festivities Begin!!"; Transliteration: "Akiba Seitaikei Kyōsō Kyoku! Meido no Moe Nobori!!" (Japanese: 秋葉生態系狂騒曲！メイドの萌え登り！！)	Masato Uchibori	Yōko Yonaiyama	Jong Heo	December 2, 2022
The "Lady Omoe Festival" is about to start, a festival in honor of the first ever Akiba Maid, where all the local Maid Cafes sell themselves and their snacks to the visitors, and then race to reach the top of a giant Lady Omoe statue where the winning maid cafe gets increased prestige and sales. With Creatureland as the sole organizer for this year's festival, the Debt Collector is tasked with instructing all Maid Cafes to ensure that Nagi's own cafe, Dazzlion, is the winner of the race. However, the Oinky Doink Manager quickly loses her copy of the guidelines as the staff prepare some pigs feet and a stand to sell them at the festival. When the Lady Omoe Festival begins, Nagomi stays up all day to make the stall look better, but the festival has been arranged so their stand is not even on the map. When Nagomi tries to sell her pigs feet elsewhere, the other maids punish her for it. As night falls, the Oinky Doink maids decide to cut in line in front of the others and race for real, not aware of the rigged guidelines. The maids literally fight their way to the top against the other Creatureland maids, with Nagomi finally planting the pig symbol at the top of Lady Omoe. After the race, Nagi decides to crown Nagomi on stage as the year's Lady Omoe for her result. However, behind the scenes, Nagi has the Debt Collector murdered for letting them win.
10	"To Die For Love: Tears Fall on Electric Town"; Transliteration: "Meido Shinjū Denki-gai o Nurasu Namidaame" (Japanese: メイド心中 電気街を濡らす涙雨)	Tetsuo Ichimura	Saji Komori	Tetsuo Ichimura	December 9, 2022
Mr. Suehiro strangles a maid to death before visiting the Oinky Doink Cafe, where business is booming after their victory in the Lady Omoe Festival. Suehiro has been a frequent guest of the maid cafe and of Ranko in particular, and asks Ranko out on a date. Though Nagomi is against the idea of Ranko falling in love, the Manager accepts on Ranko's behalf, thinking Suehiro is a wealthy banker. Okachimachi tries to stop Ranko from going out, but the rest of the cafe's staff help her with makeup and clothes. Suehiro spends the day taking her around Ueno, and then at night, offers to run away with her to Sapporo. After he leaves, Okachimachi appears again and begins to speak, warning that Suehiro plans to kill her. She then reveals herself to be the maid who gunned down Ranko's old boss, Michiyo, thinking she would get a promotion. However, Suehiro nearly murdered her, until he was interrupted by a passing cop, and the maid was hit by a speeding car while escaping. The maid decided to hide from her past by staying in a panda costume and spent several years drifting around Akiba before ending up at the Oinky Doink Cafe, which replaced the teahouse from 14 years ago. However, Ranko was soon hired at the same spot, forcing the panda to remain silent. Ranko takes her revolver and shoots the panda head, saying that Michiyo would not want to kill her. The next night, Ranko decides to deal with Suehiro herself, but never meets him as Okachimachi shoots him on his way to the train station. Back at the cafe, Okachimachi tells Ranko that Nagi originally ordered the hit on Michiyo, and now ordered one on her too. A post-credits scene reveals that Suehiro really did plan to flee with Ranko from Akihabara, holding an engagement ring before Okachimachi shot him.
11	"Battles Without Moe"; Transliteration: "Moenaki Tatakai" (Japanese: 萌えなき戦い)	Atsushi Nakagawa	Yoshihiro Hiki	Jong Heo	December 16, 2022
Creatureland sends a message to the Oinky Doink Cafe that they have officially been disowned from the group. Despite the fame from winning the Lady Omoe Festival, other Creatureland maids start harassing the cafe and even murder one of Nagomi's biggest regulars to drive business away. Ranko decides to tell the other staff about her past with Nagi and Michiyo, and resolves to face Nagi by herself. However, the next morning, the rest of the Oinky Doink staff decide to join her. The manager joins Shiipon, Yumechi, Zoya, and Okachimachi in taking the head maid of Dazzlion hostage to draw out Creatureland's main force, while Nagomi and Ranko slip into their HQ. However, Nagi already anticipated the attack, and forces the two girls to surrender, while a large force of maids fires through the windows of Dazzlion at the other Oinky Doink staff. In Nagi's office, Nagi forces Ranko and Nagomi to beg for their lives and the lives of the Oinky Doink Cafe. After desperate pleas from both maids, Nagi decides to retract her disownment of their cafe, provided they earn ten times as much "sweets money" for Creatureland. Hostilities are then ended, though not before Zoya shoots another maid on her manager's order. The next day, Ranko and Nagomi are shopping at a street market when another maid quietly murders Ranko from behind.
12	"At Moe's End"; Transliteration: "Moe no Hate" (Japanese: 萌えの果て)	Tomoaki Ōta Noriyoshi Sasaki Mitsutaka Noshitani Masakazu Hashimoto	Yoshihiro Hiki	Sōichi Masui	December 23, 2022
Nagi's fellow maids discover that Ranko's murderer was the lone surviving maid from the Wuv-Wuv Moonbeam massacre. Nagi did not intend for Ranko to be murdered but decides to let the killer maid go and finish the fight with the Oinky Doink Cafe. Meanwhile, Nagomi stays in her funeral maid outfit and takes Ranko's revolver as she tries to get revenge. First attacking a cow maid, then firing into the ceiling of the ramen shop to get information on Uzuko and her family. Nagomi learns from the ramen chef that Uzuko was a starving orphan, groomed by Michiyo to be her successor. However, after hiring Ranko, Michiyo was moved by her sincerity and decided to become more peaceful, but Uzuko could not accept the change and arranged to have Michiyo killed and Ranko imprisoned, eventually becoming Nagi. Later, the cow maids beat up Nagomi for attacking their leader, Nagomi finally snaps for everything she has experienced and goes insane for a moment, but police intervene before they can kill her and scare them off. As the Oinky Doink maids prepare for war, Nagomi looks through Ranko's personal effects and breaks down. Meanwhile, some of the Creatureland maids question Nagi's wild mood swings regarding the Oinky Doink staff, and a couple are gunned down for expressing doubts about her decision to personally lead the attack. On the day of the attack, Nagi and over 20 Creatureland maids storm Oinky Doink Cafe with guns drawn, only to be treated like normal customers. Nagomi performs a song and dance on stage for the assembled crowd, even after Nagi shoots her in the torso, and shoots another maid for applauding Nagomi's act. At the end, Nagomi points out that maids are supposed to serve people, and that their friends, neutral and even enemies would not have been killed because of this. Nagi is unmoved by the performance and empties her revolver into Nagomi, but she is then shot by the same maid who killed Ranko, and then impaled by a bamboo spear thrown by Okachimachi. 19 years later, in 2018, violence between maids has been completely abolished. Two of Nagomi's old regulars, now adults, take a friend to visit the renewed Oinky Doink Cafe where an adult Nagomi, using a wheelchair, greets them in her maid costume.

=== Stage play ===
A stage play adaptation was announced on December 26, 2022, with Keita Kawajiri writing and directing the production. It ran at the Hakuhinkan Theater in Tokyo from September 6–10, 2023.

== Reception ==
=== Previews ===
The anime series' first episode garnered generally positive reviews from Anime News Network's staff during the Fall 2022 season previews. James Beckett gave high praise to P.A. Works' "top-notch production" for taking a "late-90s nightmare version of Japan's otaku paradise into a truly grimy and lived-in battleground" and Ranko for being "a cool, funny, and badass action heroine". Caitlin Moore called it "the kind of episode where you spend 25 minutes with your jaw hanging open as your brain scrambles to process everything happening on the screen. Every time you think you have a handle on the latest twist, the plot one-ups itself in some way, either playing with yakuza movie tropes or just going balls-to-the-wall wild." Nicholas Dupree praised the series' take on the "cute-to-cutthroat twist" by adding "slapstick comedy" during the Ranko sequence. While critiquing that the "tongue-in-cheek violence" can come across in bad taste to certain viewers, he concluded that "Akiba Maid War is a pitch-black comedy in a frilly white apron, which is certainly an acquired taste, but it's exactly what my appetite is craving right now." Richard Eisenbeis praised the series' combination of "a slice-of-life story" with "an ultraviolent crime epic" throughout the episode, especially during the climax. While criticizing the opening scene for giving away the series' overall concept, he concluded that "this amounts to a minor gripe in a highly enjoyable, often hilarious first episode. I can't wait for the next one." Conversely, Rebecca Silverman felt it wasn't "funny or engaging on any level" and was stuck between being tryhard and overly reliant on the story's premise, concluding that "some visuals and the odd joke aside, the level of violence and absurdity just don't combine properly for me."

=== Series ===
Anime News Network's staff included Akiba Maid War on their top 5 best anime list of 2022: Beckett placed it at number four, calling it "one of those wonderful examples of an anime-original production that manages to tell a satisfying and complete story in just one 12-episode season." Moore placed it at number three, saying "Akiba Maid War pulls no punches, with perfectly timed comedy as dark as a Berkshire hog. On the other hand, it applies a light touch to its moments of pathos, which are always as absurd as they are sincere." Lynzee Loveridge placed it at number two, calling it "quintessentially anime in the best way possible".

At the 8th Crunchyroll Anime Awards in 2024, the series was nominated for Best Original Anime, ultimately losing to Buddy Daddies.
