= Chad Mullane =

Australian comedian, actor, writer and producer based in Japan

- Born: 28 November 1979 (age 46); Perth, Western Australia
- Occupations: comedian, actor, writer, director, translator, academic, producer
- Website: www.chad.jp

Chad Mullane (born 28 November 1979) is an Australian comedian, actor, writer, director, translator, academic and producer based in Japan.

== Career ==
Chad became the first non-Japanese comedian to enter Japan's highest-profile comedy college Yoshimoto New Star Creation (NSC) and join Yoshimoto Kogyo in 1998. As an award-winning manzai artist he has since hosted, co-hosted and made guest appearances on thousands of comedy and variety television shows. Having ranked among the top 50 comedians in Japan by reaching the semi-finals of the prestigious M-1 Grand Prix for a record eight-years consecutively, he still performs live at theaters across Japan as one part of his comedy duo (which is also called "Chad Mullane.")

As an actor Chad has performed in many award-winning films, drama series and he has also been featured in several advertising campaigns. As a writer he has frequently contributed to publications at NHK Publications and The Japan Times, and he has also authored the book The Peculiar Case of Japanese Comedy. As an academic he teaches comedy at NSC, guest lectures at universities throughout Japan and will be one of the founding lecturers at Tokyo's 'i University' opening in 2020. Chad has been an advisor to the Japanese government and its promotion of Japanese culture through the Cool Japan initiative since March 2019.

== Influences ==
Growing up in Australia, Chad was exposed to American, British and Australian humor, but developed an interest in owarai (Japanese comedy) after a student exchange program took him by chance to Osaka (a.k.a. "The City of Comedy.") Having been exposed to the rich culture of uniquely Japanese comedy (including manzai, conte, shinkigeki, oogiri and batsu game,) and being particularly fascinated by the talent of comedy duo Downtown's Hitoshi Matsumoto, Chad joined NSC, after which he spent two years as an apprentice to The Bonchi's Osamu (the first manzai artist to sell out the 14,000 capacity Nippon Budokan.) By taking Osamu as his mentor, Chad became one of only three "brothers" to cult comedian Jimmy Onishi (of Downtown no Gaki no Tsukai ya Arahende!!-fame) and shinkigeki leader Hiro Yoshida. Chad was recognized by Hitoshi Matsumoto in 2006, and after being nicknamed "The Osaka-ralian," was invited to appear on the bi-annual TV show all comedians aspire to be on: Hitoshi Matsumoto no suberanai hanashi. Chad has since collaborated with Matsumoto on several TV shows and films.

== Awards and nominations ==
Year	Title	Result	Notes
1999	Imamiya Ebisu Manzai Contest	Won	
2001	M-1 Grand Prix 2001	Third Round	
2002	M-1 Grand Prix 2002	Semi-Finalist	
2003	M-1 Grand Prix 2003	Semi-Finalist	
2004	M-1 Grand Prix 2004	Semi-Finalist	
2005	Shibuya Rockwest Cup	Won	
2005	M-1 Grand Prix 2005	Semi-Finalist	
2006	R-1 Grand Prix	Semi-Finalist	
2006	M-1 Grand Prix 2006	Semi-Finalist	
2007	M-1 Grand Prix 2007	Semi-Finalist	
2008	M-1 Grand Prix 2008	Semi-Finalist	
2009	M-1 Grand Prix 2009: The Final	Semi-Finalist	Record number of semi-final appearances
2010	CBC Radio King of Hamaguri	Won	
2010	MBS New Generation Manzai Award	Finalist	
2012	Sendai Comedy Contest	Won	

== Filmography ==
=== Film ===
Year	Title	Role	Notes
2004	Moon & Cherry	Paul	
2007	Ten Nights of Dreams	Yassan	
2007	Honeystar	Groom	Written & directed by
2008	Lala Pipo	Mr. Lala Pipo	
2009	Elite Yankee Saburo	First Guy to Die	
2009	Nodame Cantabile: The Movie	Paul Dubois, Jane Dubois, Jean Dubois, Claude Dubois	
2010	Nemuriba	Chad	
2010	Not Enough Hands	Chicken Ball Boy	Written & directed by
2012	Grafreeter Toki	Jack Hanma	
2012	Space Brothers	Raleigh Cuomo	
2012	Paper Rabbit Rope	Jose the Alpaca (voice)	
2014	Judge!	Alex Moylan	
2014	Dogeza Japan	Mr. Mediocre	Written & directed by
2015	Samurai of the Dead	Zombie George	
2015	Sideline	Nabihiko Tsuji	
2016	Kamen Rider Ghost: The 100 Eyecons and Ghost's Fated Moment	Thomas Edison	
2017	Zen and Bones: Henry Mittwer	John Mittwer	
2017	The Stand-In Thief	Dave Ross	
2018	Movies: Mr. Fukyô vs eiga-tachi	Mr. NEET	
2018	Jesus	Jesus	Won New Director's Award at 2018 San Sebastián International Film Festival
2019	Roots	Tommy	Short film

=== Television ===
==== Drama Series ====
Year	Broadcaster	Title	Role	Notes
2001	MBS	Hitori Janai No	Mark	3 episodes
2003	MBS	Drama Damas	Conman	1 episode
2007	NHK	Imo Tako Nankin	Eddie Spencer	5 episodes
2008	NHK	Hitomi	Jason	2 episodes
2009	NHK	Ghost Friends	Ryan	1 episode
2010	YTV	Kinoshita Bucho to Boku	Emcee	1 episode
2011	NHK	Haha ni nattari, naranakattari	Chad	1 episode
2011	NHK	Kumajiro: Otoko-tabi	Okami-san	5 episodes
2012	NHK	Seishun Nine	Kotaro	5 episodes
2013	NHK	Takanashi-san	Tom	1 episode
2015	YTV	Itsutsu-boshi Tourist	Mark Houston	1 episode
2015	NHK	Sono Otoko, Ishiki Takai-kei	Tom	2 episodes
2015	MBS	Tonari no Seki-kun to Rumi-chan no Jisho	Chef Bob	2 episodes
2018	NTV	Hotel on the Brink	Pierre Tanaka	10 episodes
2018	NHK	Babysitter Gin!	Steve Fever	1 episode
2019	TV Tokyo	Secret × Heroine Phantomirage!	Art	1 episode

==== Daily Shows ====
Year	Broadcaster	Title	Role	Notes
2013-2016	NHK	Shigoto no Kiso Eigo	Chad	
2015-	NHK	Eigo de Asobo with Orton	Peachy (voice)	Also written by

==== Weekly Shows ====
Year	Broadcaster	Title	Role
2003-2005	TVK	Kyanagawa	Himself
2004-2005	Fuji TV	Quiz! Hexagon	Himself
2006	Fuji TV	Impact!	Himself
2006-2007	Fandango TV	Itadaki∞	Himself (host)
2006-2008	Fuji TV	Bakusho! Red Carpet	Himself
2007	TV Tokyo	Webtama ww	Himself
2007-2008	Tokai TV	Morisugi	Himself
2007-2008	NTV	Kuchikomi! Johnny	Himself (co-host)
2007-2009	NHK	Kyou kara Eikaiwa	Himself (co-host)
2007-2009	TV Tokyo	Honban desu: Chad's Shanghai Walker	Himself (co-host)
2008	KTV	Tsukai! Everyday	Himself (co-host)
2010-2011	NHK	Matsumoto Hitoshi no Konto: MHK	Narrator
2010-2012	TV Tokyo	Ohasta 645	Chad-mushi
2011-2013	TBS	Power Pulin	Narrator
2011-2016	NTV	Nep & Imoto's Sekai Banzuke	Himself
2012-2013	LaLa TV	Everybody! Good Gakuen	Himself (co-host)
2012-2013	Nerdist Channel	Weird S*it from Japan	Himself (host)
2012-2015	NHK	Bitworld	Takeshi Tanaka
2014-2015	TV Tokyo	Hakkutsuberry	Narrator
2014-2015	TV Tokyo	Ohasta 645 Go! Go!!	Narrator
2014-2015	Dlife	Chad & Kids Omoro-English	Himself (host)

=== Music videos ===
Year	Artist	Title	Role
2007	JYONGRI	Hop, Step, Jump!	Himself
2009	100s	Sorya Sou Da	Himself

=== Advertising Campaigns ===
Year	Company	Title	Role
2006	Kirin Beverage	Namacha Panda to Kuraso	(Lyrics sung by)
2008	Coca-Cola Japan	Aquarius Vitamin Guard	Vitamin C/Himself
2009	Keihan Electric Railway	Okeihan Music Story	Noel Morinoshoji
2010	Nihon Wasou	Kareshi wa Gaikokujin, Kyoushitsu no Hi	Himself
2012	LOTTE	Fit's Sijo Saikyo! Kakurenbo Campaign	Himself
2014	Konami	World Soccer Collection	Himself
2019	Osaka Gas	Natsu no Eikaiwa Kyoushitsu	Himself

== Publications ==
=== Books ===
Year	Publisher	Title	Notes
2017	NHK Publications	Strange Tales: Japanese Comedy	ISBN 4140885394

=== Regular Contributions ===
Year	Publisher	Magazine/Paper	Title	Language
2007	NHK Publications	Kyou Kara Eikaiwa	"Chad's Body Language Lesson"	Japanese
2007-2008	NHK Publications	Kyou Kara Eikaiwa	"Chado-Chado-ish Failures"	Japanese
2007-2008	INFAS Publications	Ryuko Tsushin	"Chad's Moteru Eikaiwa"	Japanese
2007-2008	Shueisha	Margaret	"Chad's Operation: Margaret"	Japanese
2008	NHK Publications	Shin Sankagetsu Topics	"Chadotta Tales"	Japanese
2009	NHK Publications	Shin Sankagetsu Topics	"Chad's Japan-Australia, Go!"	Japanese
2009-2010	NHK Publications	Jissen Business Eigo	"The English Triangle"	Japanese
2011-2014	NHK Publications	Jissen Business Eigo	"Growing Up in Australia"	Japanese
2015-2017	The Japan Times	The Japan Times ST	"Chad's Thoughts"	English
2015-2017	The Japan Times	The Japan Times ST	"Chad's Omoro People Journal"	English
2018-	The Japan Times	The Japan Times Alpha	"How Do You Say That!"	English
2021-	Yomiuri Shimbun	Yomiuri Kodomo Shimbun	"Chad's Showtime"	Japanese

== Translation Works ==
=== Feature films ===
Year	Title
2006	Chromartie High the Movie
2007	Big Man Japan
2009	Yatterman
2009	Symbol
2010	Farewell, Mr. President
2010	What a Life!!
2010	The King of Jail Breakers
2011	Omrice
2011	Deadball
2011	Moonlight Mask
2011	Saya Zamurai
2012	TSY: Time Slip Yankee
2012	Typhoon Family
2012	All Tied Up With My Own Rope
2013	Abductee
2013	SEIZA
2013	Jelly Fish
2013	R100
2014	Oh! Father
2014	The Mole Song: Undercover Agent Reiji
2015	Samurai of the Dead
2015	At Home
2015	Mr. Maxman
2015	Secret Breaths
2016	CHIN-YU-KI: Journey to the West with Farts
2016	What if you can talk to your belongings
2016	Hentai Kamen: Abnormal Crisis
2017	MINT
2017	Carton MOOn
2017	The Stand-In Thief
2017	Jojoen
2017	Spark
2018	Watashi no Jinsei Nanoni
2019	Violence Voyager
2019	Kuso Mitai na Eiga
2019	Little Miss Period
2019	Dosukoi! Sukehira
2019	Tokyo Adios
2019	Tonde Saitama
2023	Shin Kamen Rider

=== Web series ===
Year	Broadcaster	Title	Notes
2016	Netflix	Hibana: Spark	10 episodes
2018	Netflix	Jimmy: The True Story of a True Idiot	9 episodes
2018-	Amazon Prime	Hitoshi Matsumoto's Documental	Seasons 1–5

=== Illustrated Books ===
Year	Title	Author
2009	Dr. Ink's Starry Sky Cinema	Akihiro Nishino
2010	Zip & Candy	Akihiro Nishino
2012	The Music Box Planet	Akihiro Nishino

== Impressions ==
Haley Joel Osment
Sylvester Stallone
Michael Schumacher
Setsuko from Grave of the Fireflies
Celine Dion
Paris Hilton
Disney Witches
Zlatan Ibrahimović
Diego Forlán
Carles Puyol
