= Atsushi Tsutsumishita =

Japanese comedian

- 堤下 敦
- Born: 9 September 1977 (age 49); Kanagawa-ku, Yokohama, Kanagawa Prefecture, Japan
- Education: Kanto Gakuin University dropped
- Employer: Yoshimoto Creative Agency
- Notable work: CD "Iitaikotomo Iezuni"; Photo album Otoko Utsushi

Comedy career
- Years active: 1998–
- Genres: Manzai; conte (tsukkomi)
- Website: Blog "Ore to Bābon"

Notes
- Same year/generation as: Robert; Morisanchu

Atsushi Tsutsumishita (堤下 敦, Tsutsumishita Atsushi; born 9 September 1977, in Kanagawa-ku, Yokohama, Kanagawa Prefecture) is a Japanese comedian. He performs tsukkomi in the double act Impulse. His partner is Toshiyuki Itakura.

Tsutsumishita is represented with Yoshimoto Creative Agency.

== Biography ==
In their junior high school and high school days, Tsutsumishita and Itakura belonged to the baseball club. Although Tsutsumishita was initially a substitute while serving as a captain at the Takeboshi High School Baseball club, he became the starting first baseman even though he had uniform number 13.

He formed Impulse in 1998 with his NSC classmate Toshiyuki Itakura. Before the formation, Tsutsumishita had formed a combi Plus 2 Ton with another NSC classmate, and at that time played the boke.

In September 2005, he published a photograph collection titled Otoko Utsushi with photographs by Itakura.

On 27 September 2008, Tsutsumishita was arrested for driving 80 kmh on an ordinary road with a speed limit of 50 km.

On 6 March 2010, he was involved in a multiple car collision Ryuji Akiyama of the comedy trio Robert. Akiyama suffered minor injuries.

On the 29 December 2010 broadcast of Haneru no Tobira Tsutsumishita made an on-air marriage proposal to Miki Matsuki (松枝美希) during the year-end special show. Matsuki, a former Kishidan back dancer and leading member of the OZ-MAX with DJ Ozma, accepted by dancing with Tsutsumishita. It was revealed on the 11 May broadcast that the couple registered their marriage on 3 March 2011. His wife's pregnancy was announced in the programme in November, and their eldest daughter was born on 24 January 2012.

On 14 June 2017, he was found by a police officer to be in a groggy state in the driver's seat of a car after having taken sleeping pills. Tsutsumishita was put on suspension by his agency, Yoshimoto Kogyo, and was allowed to return to television activities in late 2018.

== Filmography ==
=== Television ===
Date	Title	Network	Notes
	Run for money Tōsō-chū	CX	
20 Sep 2008	Nihon Golfers Kentei 3	TX	
	Chalida	NHK BS1	Navigator

=== Dramas ===
Date	Title	Role	Network	Notes
2004	Nurse Man ga yuku	Rokuhei Gotanda	NTV	
27 Mar 2007	Akumu no Elevator		CX	Lead role
2007	Gout Temps Nouveau na Onna-tachi	Susumu Koshimizu	KTV	
16 Nov 2009	Chichiyo, anata wa erakatta: 1969-nen no Oyaji to Boku	Riichi Onodera (age 21)	TBS	
5 Sep 2011	Marumo no Okite		CX	
2014	Tokyo Guard Center	Takamichi Kubota	Dlife	
2014	Again!	Gakuki Suga	MBS	
26 Jan 2017	Masuyama Chō Nōryoku-shi Jimusho	Regular customer	YTV	
2017	It's All About the Looks	Motoki Misawa	CX	

=== Films ===
Year	Title	Role	Notes
2007	Yoshimoto Director's 100: 100-ri ga Eiga Torimashita Love Riderbr: until I find the key to her heart		Lead role; directed and written
2008	Kung Fu Kid	Boss Burger's father	
2011	Omuraisu		
2012	Afro Tanaka	Mikio Osawa	
2021	Made in Heaven		

=== Advertisements ===
Run	Product	Notes	Ref.
2007	GREE		
Mar 2012 –	Kyushu Railway Company (JR Kyushu) Kyushu Shinkansen "Warau. Kumamoto Kagoshima"	Warau. Kagoshima; co-starred with Daisuke Miyagawa	
2015	Suntoryfoods "Boss Rainbow Mountain Blend"		

=== Books ===
Year	Title	Publisher
2012	Oto ate Ehon: Atsushi Tsutsumishita no Tsutsumi no shita wa nanda Bū?	I Freak Corporation
2013	Buta no Kaeshi―Sugu wakaru! Ijira reta toki no "Zetsumyōna Kaeshi"	Shufunotomo

=== Discography ===
Date	Artist	Title	Notes
31 Aug 2008	Muga Tsukaji-Atsushi Tsutsumishita-Yuta Kajiwara	Iitaikotomo Iezuni	Song of conte character Busonbo Master of Haneru no Tobira
