= Yuki Yamasaki =

Japanese announcer

- 山﨑 夕貴
- Born: 4 August 1987 (age 38); Kurashiki, Okayama, Japan
- Other names: Yamasakipan (ヤマサキパン); Zakiyama (ザキヤマ)
- Education: Okayama University Faculty of Economics
- Years active: 2010–
- Employer: Fuji Television
- Television: Current; Wide na Show; Former; Mezanew; Yamasakipan; Mezamashi Saturday; Mezamashi TV; Non Stop!
- Spouse: Obata no Onīsan (m. 2018)
- Children: 1
- Website: Yuki Yamasaki profile

Yuki Yamasaki (山﨑 夕貴, Yamasaki Yuki; born 4 August 1987) is a Japanese female announcer for Fuji Television.

== Current appearances ==
=== Regular ===
Run	Title	Notes	Ref.
2 Apr 2021 –	Hitoshi Matsumoto no Sake no Tsumami ni Naru Hanashi	Narrator	
5 Feb 2023 –	Mr. Sunday	Assistant moderator	

=== Occasional ===
Run	Title	Notes	Ref.
13 Feb 2013 –	Tokio Kakeru	"Yasashī Kotoba ga Sekai o Kaeru" facilitator	
29 Oct 2013 –	Bakushō Sokkuri Monomane Kōhaku Uta Gassen Special	Assistant moderator	
6 Apr 2014 –	Wide na Show	Assistant; in charge with announcer Moemi Kushiro every other week	
2 Oct 2017 –	FNS Bangumi Taikō! All-Stars Spring-Autumn Festival Special	Moderator	

== Former appearances ==
Run	Title	Notes	Ref.
21, 23 Sep 2004	Cream Stew no Mitai TV		
	FNS no Hi 26-jikan TV 2010 Chō Egao Parade Kizuna Bakushō! Odaiba Gasshuku! !	She was in charge of providing reading at the Grand Finale as a new announcer for her first year in company entry.	
	FNS 27-jikan TV Mecha-Mecha Dejitteru! Egao ni Narenakya TV janai jan!!	'Pan' Series Yoko Shono, Ayako Kato, Mio Matsumura and Yamasaki who have experience of MC, were in charge of information corner etc. as "Mecha-Mecha Smiles".	
9–11 Aug 2010	Mezamashi TV	Caster Misato Nagano acted as a substitute for weather casting	
22 Sep 2010	Sport!	Representative appearance by announcer Rio Hirai	
2 Oct 2010 – 31 Mar 2012	Mezamashi Saturday	In charge of entertainment	
7 Oct 2010 – 31 Mar 2011	Mezanew	Thursdays and Fridays; responsible for weather	
14 Oct 2010	Waratte Iitomo!	Telephone announcer	
18 Oct – 20 Dec 2010	Japan Rocket Festival		
18 Oct 2010 – 1 Apr 2011	Yamasakipan	Mondays to Thursdays	
25 Nov 2010 – 18 Aug 2016	Tonneruzu no Minasan no Okage deshita	"Talk Derby"; solver, "Female Announcers Cooking Showdown", "Ītabi o Nē Kibun", "Nanday Morning", "Announcer Yamasaki, Buy the Furniture!", "Mojimoji-kun Summer Women Announcers Festival"	
6–10 Dec 2010	Mezamashi TV	Acting caster of information caster Aiko Kaitou	
4 Apr 2011 – 30 Aug 2018	Mezamashi TV	In charge of entertainment; she appeared on Thursdays and Fridays only until 30 March 2012, she appeared every day from Monday to Friday from 2 April 2012, but only from Mondays and Tuesdays from 31 March 2014	
17 Apr 2011	1-Nen 1-kumi Heisei Kyōikug Gkuin Kitazo Shin Gakki! Team no Kizuna de Mezase Zenin Gōkaku SP	Solver (Mezamashi TV team)	
Apr–Sep 2011	Tenshi no Miyōshitsu: Kami ga Kawaku made...	MC	
14 Jul, 15 Sep, 22 Dec 2011	Tonneruzu no Minasan no Okage deshita	Female announcers' dish confrontation "Ore no Kitchen Stadium"	
27 Sep 2011 – 21 Sep 2012	Bakushō sokkuri monomane Kōhaku Uta Gassen Special	Imitator	
Oct 2011 – 25 Mar 2012	BS Fuji News	Sunday afternoon charge	
2 Oct 2011 – 25 Mar 2012	FNN Super News Weekend	Sunday narrator	
12 Nov 2011	Premium Saturday "Shin Junk Sports Talk Fukkatsu Matsuri!"	MC	
26 Nov 2011	Natsuki Kondo no All Night Nippon R	NBS; guest appearance	
2 Apr 2012 – 30 Mar 2018	Non Stop!	Moderator	
21 Apr 2012	Yonimo Kimyōna Monogatari '12 Haru no Tokubetsu-hen	As 'OL that encounter squid woman'	
31 May, 6 Sep 2012	Tonneruzu no Minasan no Okage deshita	"Ītabi o Nē Kibun"	
6 Jun 2012	Dai 4-kai AKB 48 Senbatsu Sō Senkyo Namahōsō Special		
17 Jun 2012	Shōfukutei Tsurube Nichiyōbi no sore: Yoru-ban: Fuji TV vs NBS Announcer Kōryū-sen	NBS; Guest appearance with announcer Taisei Kurata	
24 Nov 2012	1 Oku 3 Sen Man Hito ga Erabu Anime & Drama & Eiga na Serif Best 20		
28 Jan 2013	Generation Tengoku	Moderator	
13 Apr 2013	Burabura Saturday		
11 May 2013	Somosan Seppa!	Progress	
15 Sep 2014	Hero	Episode 10; as herself	
24 Oct 2014 – 20 Mar 2015	Shite miru TV! Kyōkun no Susume	Progress	
4 Nov 2014	Bakushō sokkuri monomane Kōhaku Uta Gassen Special	Moderator	
5 Dec 2014	Yumemiru Kin Baku!	OHK Guest	
17 Apr – 11 Sep 2015	Downtown Now	Progress	
18 Apr 2015	Yōgi-sha wa 8-ri no Ninki Geinin	As herself	
13 Aug 2015	Tonneruzu no Minasan no Okage deshita	"Nonde Morning"	
23 Sep 2015	Kono-wa, Sugoku nai desu ka?	Voice of Ten	
22 Oct 2015	Tonneruzu no Minasan no Okage deshita	"Yamasaki-ana, Kagu o Kau!"	
18 Aug 2016	Tonneruzu no Minasan no Okage deshita	"Mojimoji-kun Natsu no Joshi-ana Matsuri"	
6 Nov 2016 – 17 Sep 2017	Furutachi-Sun	Assistant	
3 Nov 2017 – 14 Sep 2018	Monosiri no Special ~Sun-goi Hito ga yattekuru!~	Moderator	
2 Apr 2018 – 26 Mar 2021	Tokudane!	Sub-moderator	
28 Dec 2020	Drift, Baka, Shimura Tomodachi Dai Shūgō Special!!	Studio progress	
4 Apr – 23 Dec 2022	Pop Up!	Progress moderator	

== Films ==
Year	Title	Role
2012	Bayside Shakedown The Final	TV caster

== Bibliography ==
Date	Title	Publisher	Code	Notes
Oct 2012	sarayuki	Tokyo News Service	ISBN 978-4863362673	A personal book that formed a combination with Sora Hosogai in synchronization. The company's Beautiful Lady & Television article plus unpublished cuts.

== Synchronization announcers ==
- Shinichi Tanioka
- Kotaro Kinoshita
- Sora Hodogai (transfer)
