= Yoshimoto New Star Creation =

Japanese comedy school

- 吉本総合芸能学院
- Japan

Information
- Established: 1982

The Yoshimoto New Star Creation, commonly called NSC or Yoshimoto Academy, is the comedy school established by Yoshimoto Kogyo in Japan.

== History ==
There are currently two campuses, the original NSC, established in 1982 in Osaka and the Tokyo branch NSC established in 1995. Students enroll for the purpose of becoming a comedian and the school is meant to be a systematic entry into the entertainment industry as a Yoshimoto Kogyo affiliated comedian after graduation.

Officially established as Yoshimoto General Comedy Arts Academy (吉本総合芸能学院), both the Osaka and Tokyo branches have produced numerous successful comedians and television personalities.

In order to enroll, the applicant must have graduated middle school. Each graduation class is considered as a generation, for example, the comedy duo Downtown were one of the first graduates of the school as the 1st generation at NSC Osaka in 1982

Students of the academy go through various comedy classes focused on manzai, conte and other modern owarai comedy genres. The school often brings in established comedians as speakers and temporary teachers to further the students' development.

== Notable alumni ==
=== NSC Osaka ===
Gen	Year	Month	Notable Alumni
1	1982	4	Downtown, High Heel, TOMMY's
2	1983	4	Bobcats, Sayuri・Katsumi, Masahiro Maetani
3	1984	4	Arimatsu Takashi Taikai
4	1985	4	Koji Imada, 130R, Chagama Katsura
5	1986	4	Shigeo Tsujimoto, Fusayo Kameyama,
6	1987	4	Housei Tsukitei, Hiromitsu Noriyasu, Purin Purin
7	1988	4	Ameagari Kesseitai, Narumi, Tomohiro Takayama, Yoshiyuki Yabe, Koraagen Haigouman
8	1989	4	Chihara Kyodai, FUJIWARA, Buffalo Goro, Nadagi Takeshi, Hideo Ooyama
9	1990	4	Ninety-nine, Daisuke Miyagawa, Hidetoshi Hoshida, Hebi Ichigo, Yano Hyodo, Yasushi Kawabata
10	1991	4	Messenger, Sando Katsura, Oi Kyuma, Shinichi Matsumoto
11	1992	4	Nakagawake, Tomonori Jinnai, Kenji Tamura, Kendo Kobayashi, Shuji Murakoshi, Hollywood Zakoshisyoh
12	1993	4	Kazutoyo Koyabu, COWCOW, Ponta Dohi, 2Chokenju, Tsukasa Suzuki
13	1994	4	Black Mayonnaise, Yoshimi Tokui (Tutorial), Jicho Kacho, Yasei Bakudan, Rie Kuwabata, Soushi Masumoto
14	1994	10	Football Hour, Kokado Kentarou (Lotti), Kaneshige Takashi
15	1995	4	Koji Nishida (Waraimeshi), Kenji Shimizu
16	1995	10	Soichi Nakaoka (Lotti), Goe Asagoe, Kyota Naka
17	1996	4	Viking, Aozora, Manabu Yanagi, Goriken,
18	1996	10	Family Restaurant, Matsubara Futo, Madoguchi Eto (W Engine)
19	1997	4	Takahiro Kato (Chad Mullane)
20	1997	10	Kirin, Tsunakkan, Asian, Sorashido
21	1998		Tenshin, Regular, Hideaki Murata (Toro Salmon), Chad Mullane (Chad Mullane)
22	1999		Daian, King Kong, Ryota Yamasato (Nankai Candies), Daisuke Muramoto (Woman Rush Hour), Nakayama Kinnikun, Nego-six, Kazunobu Kubota (Toro Salmon), Kota Nakayama, Missileman, Super Maradona
23	2000		Tomochika, Chimon Chochu, Moody Katsuyama, Monster Engine, Paradise Nakagawa (Woman Rush Hour), Galigali Galixon
24	2001		Masahiro Ehara, Osamu Wakai, Ishibashi Hazama
25	2002		Kenta Akiyama (Akina), Jaru Jaru, Plus Minus, Ginshari
26	2003		Fumikazu Yamane (Akina), Wagyu, Fujisaki Market, Kamaitachi, Tenjiku Nezumi, Yuzuru Kawai (Einstein), Bike Kawasaki Bike, Yasoshima (2700)
27	2004		Daisuke Moromizato, Tsune (2700), GAG
28	2005		Gion, Naoki Inada (Einstein)
29	2006		Yoshida-tachi, Commandant, Mitorizu, Kinzoku Bat
30	2007		Furima Danna, Iron Head, Amago Inter, Bambino, Hinata
31	2008		Cellulite Spa, Indians, Long Coat Daddy
32	2009		Nobuhiro (Daijizen), Musha Musha
33	2010		Colocolo Chikichiki Peppers, ZAZY, Mayurika, Donguri
34	2011		Umatosakana, Kaerutei, Fire Thunder, Sayaka, Kaerutei, Rinjin
35	2012		Yuriyan Retriever, Runny Nose, NyuNyuyuYuyuyuyuyuyu, Ganbareruya, Yutaro Hamada, Karashi Renkon, Kotei, Sho Kaga (Kagaya), Yamashita Gambling Gorilla (Gokai Captain)
36	2013		8.6Byo Bazooka, Double Higashi, Yumecchi (3ji no Heroine), Ichioku, Kimura Band (Takuro), Odaueda, Batteries, Kabe Poster, Beyan (Gokai Captain)
37	2014		Hananoi, Yu Akagi (Takuro), Nama Pharaoh, Kazato Kyogoku (9bangai Retro)
38	2015		Oflos, Tensai Pianist, Elf, Fusuya, Shun Nakamura (9bangai Retro)
39	2016		Ranran, Gyobu, Somao・Meatball
40	2017		Tetsujin Komachi
41	2018		Shinya, cacao, Tatoeba Hono, Time Keeper, Kyatsumi, Fanfare to Nekkyo, Sanyukan
42	2019		Kuumae Meteo, Yujiro (Jock Rock), Mofu Fujimoto (Denki Juice), Sui Suibun (Yamepi), Guro、Mermaid
43	2020		Yamashita, Tatoeba Hono, Yo Fukuzawa (Denki Juice), Ukari (Yamepi), Yuji Kiyokawa, Shikanoshinpu
44	2021		Atesaki Plain, Shakatora
45	2022		Harukaze ni Tsugu、Shouga Neko
46	2023		Amarufin
47	2024		Omoshiro Janken

=== NSC Tokyo ===
Gen	Year	Notable Alumni
1	1995	Shinagawa Shoji, Hachimitsu Jiro (Tokyo Dynamite), Hamaron
2	1996	Hiroaki Matsuda (Hiking Walking), Garittochu, Ginnana, Kazuyuki Sakuma, Masashi Kumada, Kiton
3	1997	Total Ten Bosch, Potato Shonen-dan, Yuichiro Nagai, AMEMIYA, Cyclone Z, Man☆tan Taro
4	1998	Robert, Morisanchu, Oniyako Tsubaki, POISON GIRL BAND, Impulse
5	1999	Heisei Nobushi Kobushi, Peace, Sanpei, Onishi Lion
6	2000	Tonikaku Akarui Yasumura
7	2001	Mo Chugakusei, LLR
8	2002	Slim Club, Takahiro Ogata (Panther), Joyman, Hikaru "Pharaoh" Hirai (Bakayo Anataha)
9	2003	Harisenbon, Shizzle, Aipa Takizawa, Yutarikan, Igo Shogi, Sho Kiryuin (Golden Bomber)
10	2004	Oriental Radio, Trendy Angel, Hannya, Fruit Punch, Impossible, Go! Minagawa, Masanori Morita, Akatsu
11	2005	Edo Harumi, Satoshi Mukai (Panther), Chocolate Planet, Sissonne, Takayuki Hamatsu
12	2006	Naomi Watanabe, Jungle Pocket, Wes-P, Ocha no Mizudanshi, Jeradon,
13	2007	Tabata Fujimoto, Boyfriend, Pistachio, Kei Yamazaki (Aiseki Start)
14	2008	Dai Taku, Nelsons, Rintaro (EXIT), Baby Gang, Kan Yamaso (Aiseki Start), Awayokuba
15	2009	Dennis, Matenro, Hirocho Nishimura, Onigoe Tomahawk, Okazu Club, Natsuko Yokosawa, Kimiko Koyama, Sanninawasete Hoshino Desu (Parpar)
16	2010	Shunshun Clinic P, Universe, Shoko Nakajima
17	2011	Cotton, Kuki Kaidan, Sugoi Ron, Ozwald
18	2012	Obata no Oniisan, Nekojuku, Rainbow, Hyokkori-han
19	2013	Full Frontal, Daiki Kanechika (EXIT)
20	2014	Buddha Maria, Ratatatta, Kanade (3ji no Heroine)
21	2015	Evers
22	2016	Nightingale Dance, Barikata Yujou Meshi, Maison, Pyute, Nansui, Mari-mari
23	2017	Reiwa Roman, Yoneda2000, Intake
24	2018	Kingyo Bancho, Sonoko, Ichigo, Komainu, Obachan
25	2019	Kazoku Chahan, Jinpe Yamauchi (Daiou)
26	2020	Bonita, AIR-CON BOOM BOOM ONESAN
27	2021	Kakeochi, Izen
28	2022	Bob no Cola
29	2023	Dotengoku
30	2024	Donkoko, Pants Banpaku, Teruyama Ouchi Gohan

=== NSC Nagoya (1993-2005, 2019-) ===
Gen	Year	Notable Alumni
2	1994	Speed Wagon, Sugi-chan
4	1996	Getters Iida
5	1997	Xabungle
