= Octpath =

Japanese idol boy band

- Origin: Japan
- Genre: J-pop
- Years active: 2022–present
- Label: Yoshimoto Kogyo
- Members: Naoki Kose; Wataru Takahashi; Kohei Kurita; Kaiho; Shu Kobori; Shinsuke Yotsuya; Shunsei Ota; Renta Nishijima
- Past members: Toma
- Website: octpath-official.com

Octpath (stylized in all caps) is a Japanese boy band consisting of eight members. They debuted with the single, "It's a Bop" in February 2022.

== History ==
=== 2021: Formation ===
Octpath was formed on November 18, 2021. On November 28, it was announced that Octpath would make their major debut in February 2022.

=== 2022–present: Debut and Showcase ===
On February 9, 2022, Octpath released their debut single, "It's a Bop".

On April 21, Toma went on hiatus due to a recent diagnosis of adjustment disorder. On June 15, their second single, "Perfect", was released.

On July 15, Wataru Takahashi went on hiatus due to poor health. Takahashi resumed group activities on September 23. On November 16, their third single, "Like", was released.

On January 27, 2023, in an official statement on Octpath's website it was announced that Takahashi would go on hiatus due to "inappropriate behavior beyond the relationship of an artist and his fans". On February 8, Octpath's debut album, Showcase, was released. On July 5, their fourth single, "Sweet", was released.

On August 7, Toma who had been on hiatus for over a year left the group. On September 2, Takahashi resumed group activities. On November 18, former TO1 member Renta Nishijima joined the group.

On February 21, their fifth single, "Octave / Daydream", was released. On July 17, their sixth single, "Fun", was released.

== Members ==
=== Current ===
- Naoki Kose (古瀬直輝)
- Wataru Takahashi (高橋わたる)
- Kohei Kurita (栗田航兵)
- Kaiho (海帆)
- Shu Kobori (小堀柊)
- Shinsuke Yotsuya (四谷真佑)
- Shunsei Ota (太田駿静)
- Renta Nishijima (西島蓮汰)

=== Former ===
- Toma (冬馬)

== Discography ==
=== Studio albums ===
Title	Album details	Peak chart positions	
Title	Album details	Oricon	Billboard
Showcase	Released: February 8, 2023; Label: Universal Music Japan; Formats: CD, digital download	1	1

=== Singles ===
Title	Year	Peak chart positions		Album
Title	Year	Oricon	Billboard	Album
"It's a Bop"	2022	1	3	Showcase
"Perfect"	2022	2	5	Showcase
"Like"	2022	2	4	Showcase
"Run"	2023	—	—	Showcase
"Sweet"	2023	2	4	Non-album singles
"Octave"	2024	2	4	Non-album singles
"Daydream"	2024	2	—	Non-album singles
"Fun"	2024	2	5	Non-album singles
"Present"	2024	—	—	Present
"Let's Go Back to Summer"	2025	3	4	Non-album singles
"Starlight Rendezvous" (スターライトランデブー)	2025	3	4	Non-album singles
"Steppin'!!!" / "Massugu na Mama" (Steppin'!!!/まっすぐなまま)	2026	3	8	Non-album singles
"—" denotes releases that did not chart or were not released in that region.
