= Dive in Wonderland =

2025 film by Toshiya Shinohara

- Theatrical release poster
- Kanji: 不思議の国でアリスと -Dive in Wonderland-
- Literal meaning: With Alice in Wonderland: Dive in Wonderland
- Revised Hepburn: Fushigi no Kuni de Arisu to -Daibu in Wandārando-
- Directed by: Toshiya Shinohara
- Screenplay by: Yuko Kakihara
- Based on: Alice's Adventures in Wonderland by Lewis Carroll Through the Looking-Glass by Lewis Carroll
- Produced by: Tomoyuki Saito; Hidemasa Tasaka
- Starring: Nanoka Hara; Maika Pugh; Koji Yamamoto; Norito Yashima; Ryuichi Kosugi; Kappei Yamaguchi; Toshiyuki Morikawa; Takahiro Yamamoto; Subaru Kimura; Ayumu Murase; Yūki Ono; Natsuki Hanae; Mayu Matsuoka; Shōtarō Mamiya; Keiko Toda
- Cinematography: Tomo Namiki
- Edited by: Ayumi Takahashi
- Music by: kotringo
- Production company: P.A. Works
- Distributed by: Shochiku
- Release date: August 29, 2025
- Running time: 95 minutes
- Country: Japan
- Language: Japanese

Dive in Wonderland (Note: Japanese: 不思議の国でアリスと -Dive in Wonderland-, Hepburn: Fushigi no Kuni de Arisu to -Daibu in Wandārando-; lit. "With Alice in Wonderland -Dive in Wonderland-") is a 2025 Japanese animated fantasy film directed by Toshiya Shinohara and written by Yuko Kakihara. The film is based on the 1865 novel Alice's Adventures in Wonderland and the 1871 novel Through the Looking-Glass by Lewis Carroll. Produced by P.A. Works and distributed by Shochiku, the film stars Nanoka Hara as the voice of Rise and Maika Pugh as Alice, alongside Koji Yamamoto, Norito Yashima, Ryuichi Kosugi, Kappei Yamaguchi, Toshiyuki Morikawa, Takahiro Yamamoto, Subaru Kimura, Ayumu Murase, Yūki Ono, Natsuki Hanae, Mayu Matsuoka, Shōtarō Mamiya and Keiko Toda. It was released in Japan on August 29, 2025, during the 160th anniversary year of Lewis Carroll's original novels.

== Voice cast ==
Character	Japanese
Rise	Nanoka Hara
Alice	Maika Pugh
The Queen of Hearts	Mayu Matsuoka
The Mad Hatter	Koji Yamamoto
The March Hare	Norito Yashima
Humpty Dumpty	Ryuichi Kosugi
The White Rabbit	Kappei Yamaguchi
The Cheshire Cat	Toshiyuki Morikawa
The Caterpillar	Takahiro Yamamoto
Akira Urai	Shotaro Mamiya
Ayako Azumino	Keiko Toda
Tweedledum	Subaru Kimura
Tweedledee	Ayumu Murase
Yamane	Yūki Ono
Mysterious Apple-shaped Creature	Natsuki Hanae

== Production ==
The film was announced on January 17, 2025. It is directed by Toshiya Shinohara with animation produced by P.A. Works and scripts written by Yuko Kakihara, Kousuke Kawazura and Mio Fujishima are designing the characters based on Tomomi Takada, Jun Suzuki and Hiranko Konohana's original designs, while kotringo is composing the music. Tomoyuki Saito of Shochiku and Hidemasa Tasaka of TBS Television are credited as producers. The film's theme song is "Zukan" (Guidebook) performed by Sekai no Owari.

== Release ==
The film was released in theaters in Japan on August 29, 2025. A European release in France, Switzerland, Belgium and Poland appeared in cinemas on January 14th 2026. A limited cinema release in the UK appeared for two days on January 18th and 19th, handled by Odeon Cinemas. In Taïwan, the film appeared in a wide release on March 6th, with the alternate title 穿越吧！不思議少女 (Let's travel through time! The Mysterious Girl)

=== Home media ===
The film released on Blu-ray and DVD in Japan via Kadokawa Video on March 25, 2026.

== Manga adaptation ==
A manga adaptation, illustrated by Eno, began serialization on Kadokawa Shoten's Comic Newtype website on July 1, 2025.
