= Viking (comedy duo) =

Japanese comedy duo

- Baikingu (バイきんぐ)
- Employer: Sony Music Artists

Comedy career
- Years active: 1996–
- Members: Eiji Kotoge (Tsukkomi); Mizuki Nishimura (Boke)

Viking (バイきんぐ, Baikingu) is a Japanese comedy duo (kombi) consisting of Eiji Kotōge (小峠英二) and Mizuki Nishimura (西村瑞樹). They are employed by Sony Music Artists and are mostly active in Tokyo. Viking are graduates of the 17th generation class at NSC Osaka. They specialize in conte and were the winners of King of Conte 2012, followed by many television performances.

== Members ==
- Eiji Kotoge (小峠英二) Born June 6, 1976 in Ōtō, Fukuoka. Mainly plays the tsukkomi. He writes all the material and skits for the unit. Kotoge is known for his quick and reactive tsukkomi in almost any situation.
- Mizuki Nishimura (西村瑞樹) Born April 23, 1977 in the city of Hiroshima. Mainly plays the boke. Known for his sensible yet unpredictable and odd character.

== History ==
The two met each other at the dormitory of a driver's ed school they attended in Oita. At the time, they were only acquaintances and were not too familiar with each other. In 1996, the two of them met each other by chance again in Osaka, as the same class at the NSC audition in 1996. Believing it was fate that brought them together, they formed the unit in May of that same year.

The unit moved to Tokyo soon after graduating NSC as they found little success in Osaka. They rose in popularity and were more active in Tokyo around 2008, but broke out in 2012. Viking was represented by Watanabe Entertainment in 1999 and changed to Yoshimoto in 2004, but were released after just one year, becoming free agents. Currently, they are represented by Sony Music Artists.

When the unit first formed, they wrote their unit name "Viking" in katakana (バイキング). However, this resulted in confusion by the public when they rose to popularity as バイキング is the same word as buffet. To avoid being mistaken for the all you can eat restaurants on search engines, the unit changed their name to write in both katakana and hiragana (バイきんぐ).

== Career ==
Viking made it to the semifinals of King of Conte in 2008 and 2011, became a finalist in 2012 for the first time and won with the highest points in the history of the competition at that time. In 2011, Kotoge entered the R-1 Grand Prix as a solo performer and made it to the semifinals.

After 2012, the media exposure from winning King of Conte has enabled Viking with continued success in the industry. The unit appeared on numerous television programs, with Kotoge at the forefront as he had more success than Nishimura, who did not achieve major recognition until 2016.

== Filmography ==
=== Television programs ===
- Geinō-kai shin'yū dokyumento jiman no tomodachi o jiman no furusato ni tsurete kaerimashita! (2024) (hosts)

== Achievements ==
- The 1st King of Conte (2008) - Semi-Finalist
- The 4th King of Conte (2011) - Semi-Finalist
- The 2nd Onbato+ Championships (2011) - Finalist, 3rd place
- The 5th King of Conte (2012) - Finalist, Winner
