= Konya wa Eeyan =

2019 single by Yoshimotozaka46

- Regular edition cover

Single by Yoshimotozaka46
- B-side: "Yaruki no Nai Ai o Thank You!"; "Genzaichi"; "Ikemen Kishidan"
- Released: 8 May 2019 (Japan)
- Genre: J-pop
- Label: Sony Music Records
- Producer: Yasushi Akimoto

Yoshimotozaka46 singles chronology
"Nakasete Kure yo" (2018)	"Konya wa Eeyan" (2019)	"Funō dewa Irarenai" (2019)

Music video
- "Konya wa Eeyan" at YouTube

"Konya wa Eeyan" (今夜はええやん) is the second single by J-pop group Yoshimotozaka46. The single was released on 8 May 2019. Like the previous single, the title track features Tsukasa Saito and Haruna Ogawa, both owarai comedians, in the center position. The track is also the theme song of the Japanese-dubbed version of the 2019 film Men in Black: International.

== Release ==
The single was released in three versions: senbatsu, RED, and regular. The senbatsu edition features the singers of "Konya wa Eeyan" on the cover, while the RED edition features RED, the subunit of Yoshimotozaka46 that performed the B-side "Yaruki no Nai Ai o Thank You!", on the cover. Both editions were bundled with a DVD containing the music video of their respective songs. The regular edition features the subunit Sweet Monster", performers of the song "Genzaichi", on the cover and does not include the song "Ikemen Kishidan".

== Track listing ==
All lyrics written by Yasushi Akimoto.

=== Senbatsu and RED editions ===
CD
No.	Title	Length
1.	"Konya wa Eeyan" (今夜はええやん)	4:30
2.	"Yaruki no Nai Ai o Thank You!" (やる気のない愛をThank you！)	4:04
3.	"Genzaichi" (現在地)	4:02
4.	"Ikemen Kishidan" (イケメン騎士団)	4:28
5.	"Konya wa Eeyan" (off vocal ver.)	4:30
6.	"Yaruki no Nai Ai o Thank You!" (off vocal ver.)	4:04
7.	"Genzaichi" (off vocal ver.)	4:02
8.	"Ikemen Kishidan" (off vocal ver.)	4:26

Senbatsu edition DVD
No.	Title	Length
1.	"Konya wa Eeyan" (Music video)

RED edition DVD
No.	Title	Length
1.	"Yaruki no Nai Ai o Thank You!" (Music video)

=== Regular edition ===
CD
No.	Title	Length
1.	"Konya wa Eeyan" (今夜はええやん)	4:30
2.	"Yaruki no Nai Ai o Thank You!" (やる気のない愛をThank you！)	4:04
3.	"Genzaichi" (現在地)	4:02
4.	"Konya wa Eeyan" (off vocal ver.)	4:30
5.	"Yaruki no Nai Ai o Thank You!" (off vocal ver.)	4:04
6.	"Genzaichi" (off vocal ver.)	4:02

== Charts performance ==
Oricon

Chart	Peak
Weekly Singles Chart	3

Billboard Japan

Chart	Peak
Japan Hot 100	18
