= Ayaka Ichinose =

Japanese gravure idol (born 1980)

- 一ノ瀬 文香
- Born: 12 August 1980 (age 45); Tochigi Prefecture
- Other name: Icchī~ (いっちぃ〜)
- Occupation: Gravure idol
- Style: Fashion; swimsuits
- Height: 158 cm (5 ft 2 in)

Ayaka Ichinose (一ノ瀬 文香, Ichinose Ayaka; born 12 August 1980, in Tochigi Prefecture) is a Japanese gravure idol and LGBT rights activist. She is represented with Yoshimoto Creative Agency.

== Personal life ==
Ichinose came out as a lesbian in a 2009 magazine interview. She began a relationship with actress Sugimori Akane in 2012 after meeting her in a gay bar in Shinjuku, Tokyo. The couple held a wedding ceremony in 2014, and they broke up in May 2017.

In January 2025, Ichinose announced her partnership to a non-celebrity woman.

== Filmography ==
=== TV programmes ===
Year	Title	Network	Notes	Ref.
2009	Heart o tsunagou	NHK E	VTR appearance	
2012	Ariyoshi Japon	TBS		
2012	Sunday Japon	TBS		
2015	Watashi no Nani ga Ike nai no? SP	TBS		

=== Films ===
Year	Title	Role
2014	Coming Out	Kaori Momoi

== Released works ==
Image DVD

Year	Title	Publisher
2007	Temptation of maiden Ayaka Ichinose	BNS
2007	Sexy Venus	BNS
2007	Onegai! Ayaka-sensei.	Aqua House
2008	Sexy Dynamite	Technical Staff
2008	My Star Ayaka Ichinose	Triangle Force
2008	Saikō Level	Orstack
2009	Beautiful naked	BNS
2009	Cara Ayaka Ichinose	Digi Works
2009	Himitsu No Toki	Shinyusha
2009	Seku-Mai	F.T.P. Label
2010	Kanjite mi nasai	Orstack Pictures
2010	Trebian	Vega Factory

DVD dramas

Year	Title	Publisher
2008	Hyper Sexy Heroine Maimomorannade: Ryūge	Zen Pictures
2008	Gradol Wrestling	Zen Pictures

=== Manga ===
Title	Notes
Real Bian	Original internet draft, from manga distribution site Manga Zero One from 8 April 2009

=== Books ===
Year	Title	Publisher	Code	Ref.
2016	Bian Kon. –Watashi ga Josei to, Kekkonshiki o Ageru made–	Futabasha	ISBN 978-4575309942	
