= BS Yoshimoto =

- Type: Satellite television network
- Country: Japan
- Headquarters: Chūō, Osaka

Programming
- Language: Japanese
- Picture format: HDTV 1080i

Ownership
- Owner: BS Yoshimoto Co., Ltd.

History
- Launched: 21 March 2022; 4 years ago

Links
- Website: www.bsy.co.jp (in Japanese)

BS Yoshimoto is a Japanese satellite television channel owned by BS Yoshimoto Co., Inc., a company owned by Yoshimoto Kogyo. Unlike other nationwide satellite channels, the channel is based in Osaka. Its programming consists on general entertainment, though it also airs some sports.

== History ==
The operating company behind BS Yoshimoto was originally set up in 2014 to operate Kawaiian TV, a channel specialized in Japanese idol-related programming. The channel opened on December 1, 2014, on the SKY PerfecTV! premium service and on online platforms. The original channel closed on November 30, 2019. In the wake of this decision, the company requested the Ministry of Internal Affairs and Communications to issue a change to the license, leaving paid satellite television and becoming a free-to-air channel on the BS (broadcasting satellite) service, under the tentative name Yoshimoto Channel. The former company was based in Naha, in Okinawa, but moved to Tokyo on February 28, 2020. In March 2021, the licensee moved its corporate headquarters from Shinjuku in Tokyo to Osaka's Chuo Ward.

On October 29, 2021, Yoshimoto Kogyo announced the launch of the channel for March 21, 2022, under the name BS Yoshimoto, and on BS channel 265. The channel was also using the corporate parent's Regional Revitalization project, where the company cooperated with local authorities in all 47 prefectures. At launch time, the channel would air programs offering "hints for regionalization and problem solving". Initially, the channel was supposed to be a hybrid channel, with some programs airing behind a subscription, but ultimately it was decided to make all of the content of the channel free-to-view.

Test broadcasts began on March 9, 2022, while regular broadcasts began at 12pm on March 21, 2022, simultaneously from both its new control room in Osaka and at the Sumida Media Lab in Tokyo. From April 1, Yuka Akama and Miki Satake were appointed as presenters.

On March 21, 2023, Koji Higashino was appointed as the channel's director of publicity.
