= Ryo Nishikata =

Japanese tarento and actress (born 1980)

- 西方凌
- Born: Atsuko Nishikata; 27 August 1980 (age 45); Aichi Prefecture, Japan
- Other names: Atsuko Kimura (real name)
- Occupations: Tarento; actress
- Years active: 2004–
- Agent: Yoshimoto Creative Agency
- Height: 1.6 m (5 ft 3 in)
- Spouse: Yuichi Kimura (m. 2012)

Ryo Nishikata (西方凌, Nishikata Ryō; born 27 August 1980, in Aichi Prefecture) is a Japanese tarento and actress. Her real name is Atsuko Kimura (木村敦子, Kimura Atsuko; née Nishikata (西方)). She appeared in the Nippon TV series Koi no kara Sawagi as the ninth generation member from 2002 to 2003 and was nicknamed Sakan-ya (左官屋). In 2004 she started other careers other than a tarento. She appeared in television advertisements and music videos. Her film debut was Nise-satsu in April 2009.

Nishikata is represented with Yoshimoto Creative Agency. It was discovered that in 2009 she is dating Nise-satsu director Yuichi Kimura. After three years they were later married in May 2012.

== Filmography ==
=== TV series ===
Variety

Year	Title	Network
2002	Koi no kara Sawagi	NTV
	Geinō Bang	NTV
	Manten Aozora Restaurant	NTV
	Oh! Doya Kao Summit	ABC
	Shabekuri 007	NTV
	Gokujō Jikara	TV Tokyo
	Down Town DX	NTV
	Butcha ke Nahāre	YTV

Drama

Year	Title	Role	Network	Notes
2012	Deka Kurokawa Suzuki	Reiko Yamashita	YTV	Episode 4
2012	Kuroi Jū-ri no Hitomi Kuroki 2		NHK BS Premium	
2014	Isha-ryō Bengoshi: Anata no Namida, Okane ni Kaemashou	Setsuko Kumagai	YTV	Episode 5

=== Advertisements ===
Year	Title
2004	Spa Resort Hawaiians
2004	Sharp (SH901iC) Docomo
2006	WOWOW Only W
2006	The Oriental Land Company Tokyo DisneySea
2006	Kentucky Fried Chicken Christmas Campaign
2006	Smirnoff Ice
2006	Murasaki Sports
2007	Make Mania
2008	Tokyo Tatemono Brilia
2008	Canon DPS

=== Music videos ===
Year	Title
2004	Moomin "Kiminotonari"
2006	AAA "Soul Edge Boy"
2007	TVXQ "Begin"
2007	Ketsumeishi "Fuyu Monogatari"
2007	Ink. "Ink Punk Phunk"
2008	Masayoshi Yamazaki "Mayonaka no Boon Boon"
2009	muddy on the Sakuban "Ozis"

=== Films ===
Year	Title	Role
2009	Nise-satsu	Misako Shimamoto
2010	Hito no Sabaku: Kyō no Chōsho	
2010	No Longer Human	
2011	Wararaifu!!	
2011	Kyon no iru Shima	
2011	Om Rice	
2012	Onaji Hoshi no Shimo, sorezore no Yoru	
2014	Kaa-chan ni Okuru Uta	Hazuki Shinjo

=== Others ===
Year	Title	Website
2010	Onna-tachi wa Ni-do Asobu: Yume no Onna	BeeTV

=== Stage ===
Year	Title
2011	Lovely Corporation Mejiro Shiten
2011	Koi ni Ochita na Tantei

=== Books ===
Year	Title	Notes
2011	Kanojo ga Kaisha o Yameta Riyū: Yume o Kanaeta "Moto Shain" 13-ri no Monogatari	Interviewed by Keiko Kageyama
