= Nakasete Kure yo =

2018 debut single by Yoshimotozaka46

- DVD edition cover

Single by Yoshimotozaka46
- B-side: "Kimi no Kuchibiru o Hanasanai"; "Yatto Koko Made" (DVD version); "Bourbon Soda" (DVD version); "Daitemiru Kai?" (Regular)
- Released: 26 December 2018 (Japan)
- Genre: J-pop
- Label: Sony Music Records
- Producer: Yasushi Akimoto

Yoshimotozaka46 singles chronology
"Nakasete Kure yo" (2018)	"Konya wa Eeyan" (2019)

Music video
- "Nakasete Kure yo" at YouTube

"Nakasete Kure yo" (泣かせてくれよ) is the debut single by J-pop group Yoshimotozaka46. The single was released on 26 December 2018, three months after the group's roster was finalized. The song is written in a Kansai dialect and features Tsukasa Saito and Haruna Ogawa, both owarai comedians, in the center position.

== Release ==
The single was released in two versions, a DVD edition and a regular edition. The DVD edition includes a separate DVD with the music videos of "Nakasete Kure yo" and "Kimi no Kuchibiru o Hanasanai". Each regular edition had a different member of Yoshimotozaka46 printed on the cover. A contest, held to determine which member's version would sell the most copies, was won by Haruna Ogawa.

== Track listing ==
All lyrics written by Yasushi Akimoto.

=== DVD edition ===
No.	Title	Length
1.	"Nakasete Kure yo" (泣かせてくれよ)	4:25
2.	"Kimi no Kuchibiru o Hanasanai" (君の唇を離さない)	4:55
3.	"Yatto Koko Made" (やっとここまで)	3:37
4.	"Bourbon Soda" (バーボンソーダ)	4:28
5.	"Nakasete Kure yo" (off vocal ver.)	4:25
6.	"Kimi no Kuchibiru o Hanasanai" (off vocal ver.)	4:55
7.	"Yatto Koko Made" (off vocal ver.)	3:37
8.	"Bourbon Soda" (off vocal ver.)	4:25

DVD
No.	Title	Length
1.	"Nakasete Kure yo" (Music video)	4:20
2.	"Kimi no Kuchibiru o Hanasanai" (Music video)	4:50

=== Regular Edition ===
CD
No.	Title	Length
1.	"Nakasete Kure yo" (泣かせてくれよ)	4:25
2.	"Kimi no Kuchibiru o Hanasanai" (君の唇を離さない)	4:55
3.	"Daitemiru Kai?" (抱いてみるかい?)	3:54
4.	"Nakasete Kure yo" (off vocal ver.)	4:25
5.	"Kimi no Kuchibiru o Hanasanai" (off vocal ver.)	4:55
6.	"Daitemiru Kai?" (off vocal ver.)	3:54

== Weekly chart performance ==
Oricon

Chart	Peak
Weekly Singles Chart	3

Billboard Japan

Chart	Peak
Japan Hot 100	18
