= Takashi Yoshida (comedian) =

Japanese comedian

- 吉田 敬
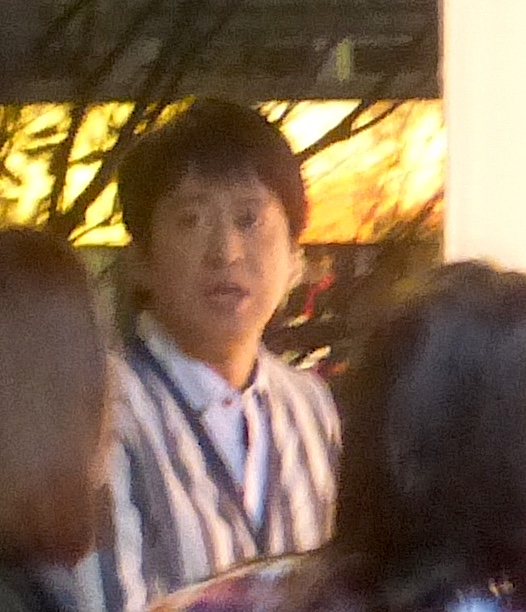
- Born: 27 June 1973 (age 52); Fushimi-ku, Kyoto
- Other name: Yossan (よっさん)
- Education: Kyoto Municipal Hiyoshigagaoka High School; Yoshimoto General Performing Arts College (NSC) Osaka Thirteenth Generation
- Years active: 1995–
- Agent: Yoshimoto Creative Agency
- Style: Manzai
- Height: 173 cm (5 ft 8 in)
- Partner: Ryuichi Kosugi

Notes
- Same year/generation as: Tutorial; Untouchable; Jicho Kacho

Takashi Yoshida (吉田 敬, Yoshida Takashi; born 27 June 1973, in Kyoto, Kyoto Prefecture) is a Japanese comedian who performs boke in the comedy duo Black Mayonnaise. His standing position is in the right. His partner is Ryuichi Kosugi. He is represented with Yoshimoto Kogyo.

== Awards ==
Year	Award	Notes
1996	17th Imamiya Children's Ebisu Manzai Competition Kagawa Kimura Prize	As Twin Tail
2002	23rd ABC Comedy Newcomer Grand Prix Newcomer Award	
2002	37th OBC Top Comedy Awards Newcomer Award	
2002	17th NHK Newcomertainment Grand Prize Performing Arts Grand Prize	
2003	32nd Top Comedy Award Best Recollection Award	
2005	5th Autobacs M-1 Grand Prix	

== Filmography ==
=== TV series ===
Year	Title	Network	Notes	Ref.
2012	Bla-Mayo Yoshida no Gakeppachi!	Pachi-Slo Site Seven TV	MC	
2015	Suki ka Kirai ka Iu Jikan	TBS	MC	
2016	Bla-Mayo Yoshida tōichi no Otoko Fune	Japan Leisure Channel	MC	
2016	Columbia Idol Ikusei Variety 14 Shōjo Funtō-ki! Major Debut e no Michi	Kawaiian TV	MC	

=== Films ===
Year	Title	Notes
	Kishiwada Shōnen Gurentai	
2006	Nichijō	
2007	Nichijō: Koi no Koe	
	Delivery?	Director

=== Advertisements ===
Year	Title
2010	Doshisha Robro-TV "Robro no Kosugi"
2010	Hirakata Park "Hira-Par Nīsan"
2010	H.I.S. "Kaigai Ikitaissu wā"
2011	Suntory Ginmugi "Sorezore no Ginmugi Dai 1-wa 'Hanami'"

=== Image characters ===
Year	Title	Notes
2013	Nihon Kai Dō-ō Kettei-sen	Special Supporter

=== Music videos ===
Title	Notes
Kinmokusei "Kinmokusei no Hana"	"Kinmokusei e.p." song

== Bibliography ==
Year	Title	Code
2009	Black Mayonnaise Takashi Yoshida no butsubutsu (Shinsho-ban)	ISBN 4847018281
2012	Black Mayonnaise Takashi Yoshida no butsubutsu (Bunko-ban)	ISBN 4344419456
2014	Jinsei wa, Pachinko de Osowatta.	ISBN 4847092201
