= Funō dewa Irarenai =

2019 single by Yoshimotozaka46

- Type A cover

Single by Yoshimotozaka46
- B-side: "Stray Sheep"; "Dotsuku yori Warawasero"; "Mekkemon" (DVD edition); "Suki ni Natte Gomennasai" (Type-A)
- Released: 25 December 2019 (Japan)
- Genre: J-pop
- Label: Sony Music Records
- Producer: Yasushi Akimoto

Yoshimotozaka46 singles chronology
"Konya wa Eeyan" (2018)	"Funō dewa Irarenai" (2019)

"Funō dewa Irarenai" (不能ではいられない) is the third single by J-pop group Yoshimotozaka46. The single was released on 25 December 2019. The title track features Naoto Ikeda and Mari Kotera at the center position.

== Release ==
The single was released as three versions: DVD, Type A, and Type B. The DVD edition contained four B-sides and was also bundled with a DVD containing the music video of "Funō dewa Irarenai" and "Stray Sheep". Type A contained three B-sides, the last of which is unique; Type B did not have any B-sides.

== Track listing ==
All lyrics written by Yasushi Akimoto.

=== DVD edition ===
CD
No.	Title	Sub-unit	Length
1.	"Funō dewa Irarenai" (不能ではいられない)	RED	4:01
2.	"Stray Sheep"	Circus	4:33
3.	"Dotsuku yori Warawasero" (どつくより笑わせろ)	Sweet Monster	3:00
4.	"Mekkemon" (めっけもん)		4:54
5.	"Funō dewa Irarenai" (off vocal ver.)		4:01
6.	"Stray Sheep" (off vocal ver.)		4:33
7.	"Dotsuku yori Warawasero" (off vocal ver.)		3:00
8.	"Mekkemon" (off vocal ver.)		4:52

DVD
No.	Title	Length
1.	"Funō dewa Irarenai" (Music video)
2.	"Stray Sheep" (Music video)

=== Type A ===
No.	Title	Sub-unit	Length
1.	"Funō dewa Irarenai" (不能ではいられない)	RED	4:01
2.	"Stray Sheep"	Circus	4:33
3.	"Dotsuku yori Warawasero" (どつくより笑わせろ)	Sweet Monster	3:00
4.	"Suki ni Natte Gomennasai" (好きになってごめんなさい)	CHAO	3:56
5.	"Funō dewa Irarenai" (off vocal ver.)		4:01
6.	"Stray Sheep" (off vocal ver.)		4:33
7.	"Dotsuku yori Warawasero" (off vocal ver.)		3:00
8.	"Suki ni Natte Gomennasai" (off vocal ver.)		3:54

=== Type-B ===
No.	Title	Sub-unit	Length
1.	"Funō dewa Irarenai" (不能ではいられない)	RED	4:01
2.	"Suki ni Natte Gomennasai" (off vocal ver.)		4:00

== Charts performance ==
Oricon

Chart	Peak
Weekly Singles Chart	3

Billboard Japan

Chart	Peak
Japan Hot 100	15
