= Robert (owarai) =

Japanese comedy trio consisting of

- Robāto (ロバート)
- Employer: Yoshimoto Kōgyō

Comedy career
- Years active: 1999–
- Genre: Conte
- Members: Ryūji Akiyama (Boke); Hiroshi Yamamoto (Tsukkomi); Hiroyuki Baba (Boke)

Notes
- Same year/generation as: Chidori; Morisanchu; Impulse

Robert (ロバート, Robāto) is a Japanese comedy trio consisting of Ryūji Akiyama (秋山竜次), Hiroshi Yamamoto (山本博) and Hiroyuki Baba (馬場裕之) who have featured in a number of television shows. They are graduates of the Yoshimoto NSC Tokyo 4th generation class and are employed by Yoshimoto Kogyo. Formed in 1998, they are the winners of King of Conte 2011 and are mostly active in Tokyo.

== Members ==
- Ryūji Akiyama (秋山 竜次) Born August 15, 1978 in Moji-ku, Kitakyūshū, Fukuoka. Plays the boke. He is the main writer of the group's material and skits.
- Hiroshi Yamamoto (山本 博) Born September 5, 1978 in Ōra, Gunma. Plays the tsukkomi.
- Hiroyuki Baba (馬場 裕之) Born March 22, 1979 in Moji-ku, Kitakyūshū, Fukuoka. Plays the boke.

== Life and career ==
Akiyama and Baba have known each other since kindergarten, attending the same school from then to high school in their hometown of Moji-ku, Kitakyūshū. Akiyama moved to Tokyo after graduating high school with the initial goal of opening up a grocery store in Daikanyama. This changed as he instead enrolled in the Yoshimoto NSC and invited Baba to also enroll and move to Tokyo. The two of them formed the unit Akiyama-Baba, with Akiyama as the boke and Baba as the tsukkomi. However, the group struggled as Baba's role paled in comparison to Akiyama, and they determined that he was not fit to be a tsukkomi and invited Toshiyuki Itakura (Currently in the comedy duo, Impulse) to play the tsukkomi role. The three formed a trio called Zenairu, but was quickly disbanded soon after as Itakura preferred to play a boke role.

Yamamoto was in the same 4th generation class as Akiyama and Baba, but had formed a unit called Yamamoto Yamazaki, which disbanded after 2 months when his partner quit NSC. After other failed attempts at forming a unit, Yamamoto heard about the disbandment of Zenairu and approached Akiyama and Baba.

The three formed the trio in December 1998 and debuted the year after, making strides in their career with various television appearances in the 2000s. Akiyama in particular gained popularity, becoming a regular participant in the oogiri competition special program IPPON Grand Prix. In 2011, the trio won King of Conte.

== Media ==
This list consists only of media appearances made by the trio when they appear together as Robert.

=== Current regular programs ===
==== Television ====
- Do-ōmo (ドォーモ) (Kyushu Asahi) (2019–Present) 1st and 2nd Wednesdays
- Unnan Kyokugen Neta Battle! The Iromonea Warawasetara 100man Yen (ウンナン極限ネタバトル! ザ・イロモネア 笑わせたら100万円) (TBS TV) (2011–Present)
- Quiz Presents Variety Q-sama!! (ウクイズプレゼンバラエティー Qさま!!) (TV Asahi) (2004–Present) Semi-regular
- Dream East West Neta Gassen (ドリーム東西ネタ合戦) (TBS TV) (2014–Present)

==== Web series ====
- Ohayou Robert (おはようロバート) (AbemaTV) (2018–Present)

=== Movies ===
- Cromartie High – The Movie (2005)

=== Commercials ===
- Proto Corporation (2002-2003)
- Takara (2004)
- Hanjuku Hero (Square Enix, 2005)
- uno (Shiseido, 2006)
- Nissan (2006)
- Qosimo (Toshiba, 2006)
- Sanpo Foods (2008)
- Pokémon Diamond and Pearl, Nintendo DS (Nintendo, 2008 - 2009)
- Mizkan (2014)
- Kapuriko (Ezaki Glico, 2015) - alongside Miru Shiroma (NMB48)
- Gyu-Kaku (2016)

=== Voice acting ===
- Pokémon Ranger and the Temple of the Sea - Korean ver. (2006)
- Pokémon: The Rise of Darkrai (2007)
- Pokémon: Giratina and the Sky Warrior (2008)
- Pokémon: Arceus and the Jewel of Life (2009)
- Like a Dragon: Pirate Yakuza in Hawaii (2025)
