= Sōichirō Sorihashi =

- 反橋 宗一郎
- Born: 18 September 1987 (age 38); Kanagawa Prefecture, Japan
- Other name: Sori
- Occupations: Actor, voice actor
- Years active: 2011 - present
- Agent: Yoshimoto Creative Agency
- Height: 1.71 m (5 ft 7 1/2 in)
- Website: Sōichirō Sorihashi

Sōichirō Sorihashi (反橋 宗一郎, Sorihashi Sōichirō; born September 18, 1987 in Kanagawa Prefecture) is a Japanese actor and voice actor, represented by Yoshimoto Creative Agency. In 2010, Sorihashi was placed in L.A.F.U., a new unit of sixteen members under the auspices of Yoshimoto Kogyo. The group debuted with Sorihashi as lead singer in April 2011. In 2016, L.A.F.U. was dissolved and since then Sorihashi has appeared mainly in stage plays.

== Filmography ==
=== Television ===
- Star Hime Sagashi Tarō (TV Tokyo, 2010–11)
- Ja dekinai yume no 10-kakan (BS, 2012)
- Mōsō no ōji-sama (2014)
- Mono mane benishiroutagassen (Fuji Television)

=== Video games ===
- La Corda d'Oro (2012) as Junya Niwa
- Geten no Hana (2013) as Louis de Almeida
- Kiniro no Corda 3: AnotherSky (2014) as Mamoru Sorimachi
- Geten no Hana: Yume akari (2014) as Louis de Almeida
- Harukanaru Jikū no Naka de 6 (2015) as Journalist

=== Theater ===
- Debt Equity Swap (2009) as Shōhei
- Bidō Roman Daikatsugeki 〜Hakkenden〜 (2010) as Ōsumi Inuyama
- Makoto 〜tobidase shinsenkumi (2012) as Fujichi Saitō
- Uorutā miti ni sayonara (2013) as Super Manta
- Okujō Wandārando (2013)
- Girls Rockettia (2013)
- Abc ★ Akasaka bōizukyabarē (2013) as Tadaaki Dōsono
- Arupusu ichimanjaku vol.1 (2013)
- L.A.F.Utheatrical performance vol.1 (2014)
- Myūjikaru ai no uta o utaou (2014)
- L.A.F.Utheatrical performance vol.2 (2014)
- It's awful! (2014)
- Closet ZERO (2014)
- Arupusu ichimanjaku vol.2 (2014)
- Harukanaru Jikū no Naka de 5 (2014)
- Agaruta no niji (2015)
- Voices of a Distant Star (2015)
- Samurai Warriors (2015) as Masamitsu Asai
- Agaruta no hana (2015)
- Eru sabotāju (2015)
- La Corda d'Oro: BlueSky FirstStage (2015) as Shirou Egami
- Jinbōchō tokubetsu kōen shujinkō wa dare? (2015)
- Harukanaru Jikū no Naka de 6 as Periodista
- Butai Anjera (2016) as Karudan
- RANPO chronicle Shinkirō kitan (2016) as Shuen
- Heian shangurira! 〜Īna gokuraku, naku na uguisu, kyūchū Retsu-den〜 (2016) as Aki/Tei
- Rōdoku geki kumo wa waki, hikari afurete (2016)
- Butai gurafā 2 (2016) as Itami
- ōkina niji no ato de 〜fudō shi kyōdai〜 (2016) as Daichi Fudō
- Kyo Kara Maoh!: Maō bōsō-hen (2016) as Ken Murata
- Bugbusters (2016) as Aoyagi
- The Legend of Heroes: Trails of Cold Steel (2017) as Patrick T. Higharms
- Dynasty Warriors (2017) as Gakushin
- Myūjikaru sayonara sorushie (2017) as Henri de Toulouse-Lautrec
- Black Dice (2017) as Kurokawa
- Gensō kitan shirohebi-den (2017) as King Lin
- Rōdoku geki in'yōshi (2017)
- Captain Tsubasa (2017) as Hikaru Matsuyama
- Hansamu rakugo dai 9-dan (2017)
