= Yoshimoto Mugendai Hall =

Performance center in Japan

Coordinates: 35°39′41″N 139°41′51″E

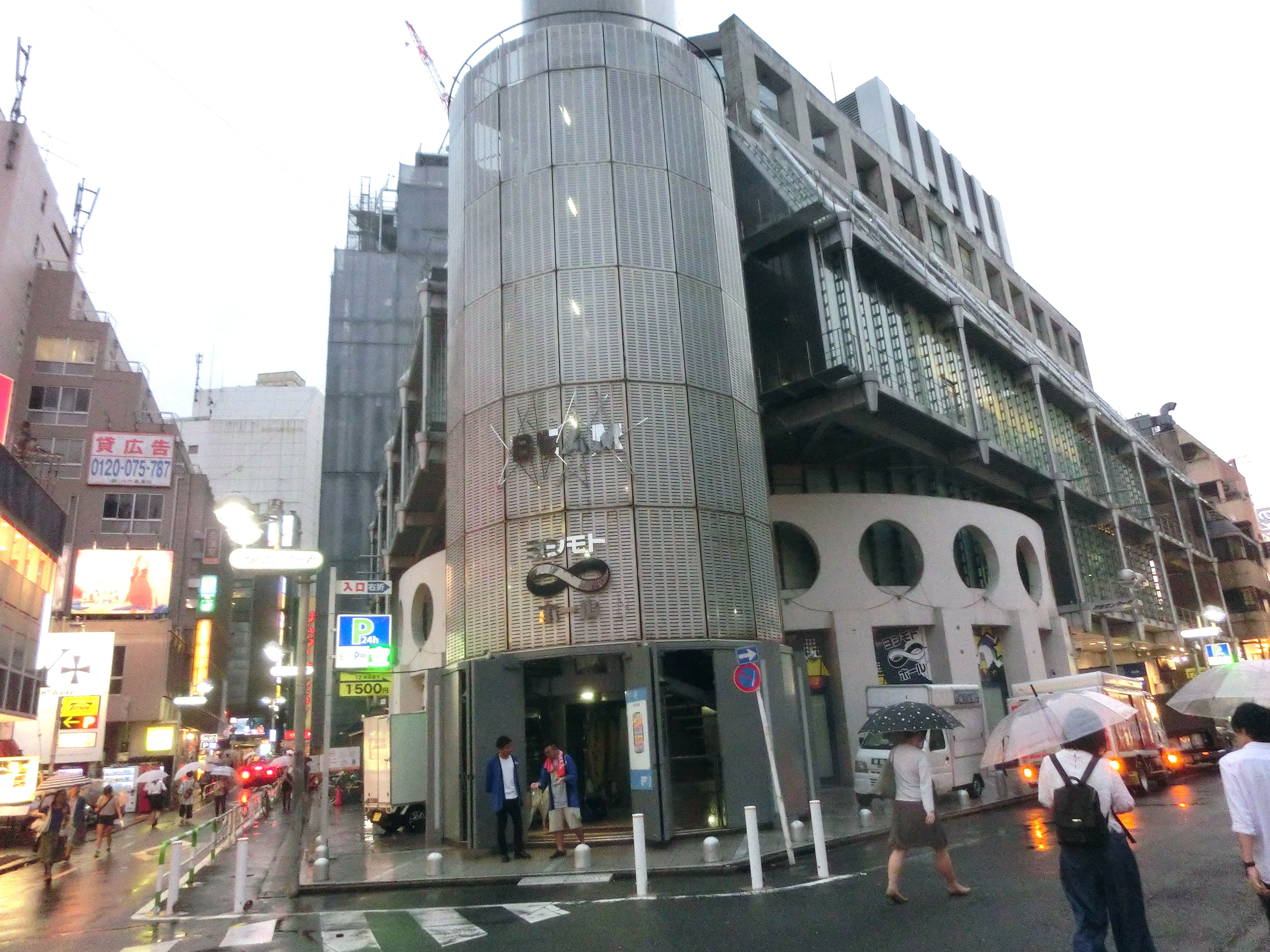
An image of Yoshimoto Mugendai Hall

Yoshimoto Mugendai Hall (ヨシモト∞ホール, Yoshimoto Mugendai Hōru) is a public indoor stage owned by the Japanese entertainment conglomerate Yoshimoto Kōgyō situated in Shibuya, Tokyo. The stage opened on March 25, 2006 and has since staged the Yoshimoto Mugendai event hosting daily owarai performances and live broadcasts on television and over the internet. Yoshimoto Mugendai, which commenced on November 11, 2005, was held at the now closed Ariake Studio prior to the opening of Yoshimoto Mugendai Hall.

Mugendai means "infinity" in Japanese and the symbol ∞, often replaces the word itself in casual Japanese writing.

== Live event ==
The daily live performances, which are open free to the public, are hosted by popular owarai duo Oriental Radio and comedian Hosshan. For the purposes of the show, the hosts are referred to as "navigators". The entire 5 hours is broadcast live on the Yoshimoto's television channel, Fandango TV, which is dedicated to broadcasting live owarai acts and Yoshimoto variety, and is also broadcast over the internet.

The contents of each show generally rotate according to a weekly schedule featuring many corners common to Japanese television, although guests and special appearances on the stage vary widely from day to day. Almost all of the guests on Yoshimoto Mugendai are minor Yoshimoto comedians, although much more famous acts (such as Jichō Kachō) have made appearances in the past.

There is an official monthly magazine for Yoshimoto Mugendai and the hall called YOOH!, featuring interviews with the guests and information on future shows.
