= Yoshimoto Kogyo =

Japanese entertainment company

Yoshimoto Kogyo Holdings Co., Ltd.

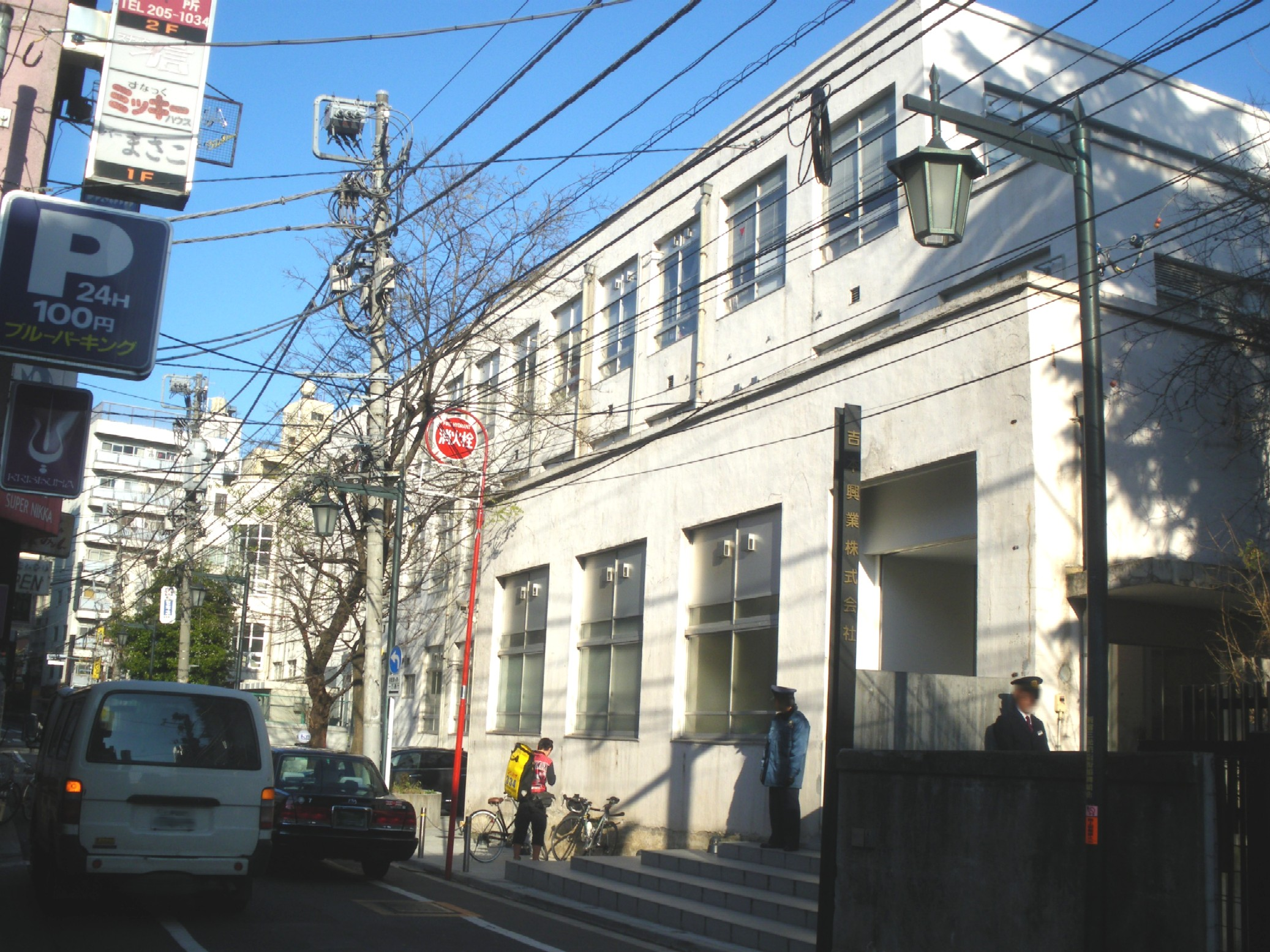
- Native name: 吉本興業ホールディングス株式会社
- Romanized name: Yoshimoto Kōgyō Hōrudeingusu Kabushiki-gaisha
- Formerly: Yoshimoto Kogyo Co., Ltd. (1948-2007)
- Type: Kabushiki
- Industry: Entertainment; Production company (Television, theater); Talent agency
- Founded: 22 April 1912; 114 years ago (brand); 1 March 1932; 94 years ago (company)
- Founder: Kichibei Yoshimoto
- Headquarters: Shinjuku, Tokyo; Chūō-ku, Osaka, Japan
- Area served: Japan
- Net income: ¥ 600 million
- Total assets: ¥ 61.7 billion
- Owner: Fuji Media Holdings, Inc. 12.13% Nippon TV 8.09% Tokyo Broadcasting System Television 8.09% TV Asahi 8.09% and more
- Number of employees: 610 (not including talents under their agency)
- Subsidiaries: Yoshimoto Kogyo Co., Ltd. Yoshimoto Developments; Yoshimoto Music Entertainment Co., Ltd. Yoshimoto Universal Tunes; Yoshimoto Administration and more
- Website: www.yoshimoto.co.jp/corporate/

Yoshimoto Kogyo Holdings Co., Ltd. (吉本興業ホールディングス株式会社, Yoshimoto Kōgyō Hōrudeingusu Kabushiki-gaisha) is a Japanese entertainment conglomerate. It was founded in 1912, Osaka, as a traditional theatre, and has since grown to be one of the most influential companies in Japan, employing most of Japan's popular owarai (comedy) talent, producing and promoting the shows they appear in. The two main headquarters are stationed in Osaka and Tokyo.

Yoshimoto has been expanding its business in recent years, due to the owarai boom. They now have their own comedy theme park in Otaru, Hokkaido and have begun signing the likes of musicians, producers, athletes and singers alongside business with the Japanese owarai industry.

== History ==
=== 1912–1932: Establishment of Yoshimoto Kogyo-bu ===
On April 1, 1912, Kichibei Yoshimoto and his wife Sei Yoshimoto purchased the Second Arts Building in Osaka. They later established Yoshimoto Kogyo-bu in January 1913 in Shinsaibashi. In 1922, they purchased two theatre establishments in January and May in Tokyo and Yokohama.

=== 1932–2005: Rename to Yoshimoto Kogyo, influence on manzai ===
On March 1, 1932, Yoshimoto Kogyobu changed its name to Yoshimoto Kogyo and set up their second headquarters in Tokyo. In 1933, Yoshimoto Kogyo's film department was established. Yoshimoto helped shape the manzai comedic style after World War II, and the kanji that used for the word manzai were introduced by Yoshimoto in 1933. In November 1935, Asakusa Kagetsu Theatre opened under Yoshimoto Kogyo in Asakusa, Tokyo. In 1941, in collaboration with the national intelligence agency and the Imperial Rule Assistance Association, Yoshimoto Kogyo established the Yoshimoto Theatre Caravan and began tours across the nation. On February 13, 1943, Tsūtenkaku, a landmark tower owned by Yoshimoto, suffered a fire which severely damaged it. Rather than repairing the structure, it was disassembled with the steel and other materials used for the war effort. On March 10, 1945, Several theatres owned by Yoshimoto Kogyo were destroyed or severely damaged due to the Bombing of Tokyo. In October 1946, the Yoshimoto Kogyo headquarters in Tokyo split off from the main company to form its own entity as Yoshimoto Kabushiki Gaisha. In November 1946, Yoshimoto Kabushiki Gaisha established the Oizumi Eiko Kabushiki Gaisha, which later joined several other companies to form Toei Company. On May 14, 1949, Yoshimoto Kogyo began trading on the Osaka Securities Exchange.

In 1959, the company established its own comedy troupe theater group, Yoshimoto Shinkigeki. On October 2, 1961, Yoshimoto Kogyo began trading on the Tokyo Stock Exchange. From 1962 to 1963, the Kyoto Kagetsu Theater and the Namba Kagetsu Theater opened. In 1982, Yoshimoto New Star Creation was established in Osaka. A second headquarters in Tokyo was established in 1995.

=== 2005–present: Expansion ===
In January 2005, Isao Yoshino replaced Masao Kimura as director. Kimura had been part of the company since entering in 1969. Yoshimoto Kogyo, Faith, Fandango and Intel Japan formed a strategic alliance, and established Bellrock Media in the United States. On October 1, 2007, Yoshimoto Kogyo restructured as a holding company. In 2009, Yoshimoto Kogyo establishes partnership with the Creative Artists Agency. On February 24, 2010, Yoshimoto Kogyo stopped trading on all stock exchanges.

== Controversies ==
=== Anti-social group scandal ===
In 2019, several comedians associated with Yoshimoto Kogyo admitted they had accepted money and attended parties held by the yakuza in 2014 without the knowledge of the company. 11 celebrities under the company were suspended, one of whom included Hiroyuki Miyasako. Shinya Irie, a member of the comedy duo Karateka, was fired earlier for arranging their appearances at the party without the agency's permission. President and CEO Akihiko Okamoto also admitted that the company had found out about the connection between the comedians and the anti-social forces but pressured the comedians to stay silent. Okamoto also apologized for Miyasako and Ryo Tamura and decided to reinstate their contracts after initially firing them. He and chairman Hiroshi Osaki vowed to take a 50% pay cut for one year as atonement over the scandal. The celebrities returned from suspension and resumed their activities on August 19, 2019.

== Artists ==
=== Comedians ===
==== Solo ====
- Sanma Akashiya
- Takashi Fujii
- Koji Higashino
- Tomonori Jinnai
- Koji Imada
- Yuichi Kimura
- Kendo Kobayashi
- Kazutoyo Koyabu
- Daisuke Miyagawa
- Shoji Murakami
- Obata no Oniisan
- Jimmy Onishi
- Onishi Lion
- Tomochika (comedian)
- Naomi Watanabe
- Tonikaku Akarui Yasumura
- Hōsei Tsukitei
- Hanako Yamada
- Natsuko Yokosawa
- Yuriyan Retriever

==== Groups ====
- 130R (Owarai) (Hon Kon and Itsuji Itao)
- Aiseki Start (Kei Yamazaki and Kan Yamazoe)
- All Hanshin-Kyōjin (All Hanshin and All Kyojin)
- Akina (Kenta Akiyama and Nobukazu Yamane)
- Amakō Inter (Nagisa and Seiko)
- Ameagari Kesshitai (Hiroyuki Miyasako and Tōru Hotohara)
- Bad Boys (Kiyoto Omizo and Masaki Sata)
- Chidori (Daigo and Nobu)
- Chihara Kyodai (Chihara Seiji and Chihara Junior)
- Black Mayonnaise (Takashi Yoshida and Ryuichi Kosugi)
- Cocorico (Shōzō Endō and Naoki Tanaka)
- Colocolo Chikichiki Peppers (Soto Nishino and Nadal)
- COWCOW (Yoshi and Kenji Tada)
- Downtown (Masatoshi Hamada and Hitoshi Matsumoto)
- EXIT (Rintaro and Daiki Kanechika)
- Football Hour (Terumoto Goto and Nozomu Iwao)
- Fruit Punch (Kenji Murakami and Kentaro Watari)
- FUJIWARA (Toshifumi Fujimoto and Takayuki Haranishi)
- Ginshari (Kazuhiro Unagi and Nao Hashimoto)
- Gokuraku Tombo (Koji Kato and Keiichi Yamamoto)
- Hanamaru・Daikichi Hakata (Hanamaru Hakata and Daikichi Hakata)
- Harisenbon (Haruka Minowa and Haruna Kondou)
- Heisei Nobushi Kobushi (Takashi Yoshimura and Kenta Tokui)
- Impulse (Toshiyuki Itakura and Atsushi Tsutsumishita)
- Jaru Jaru (Junpei Goto and Shusuke Fukutoku)
- Jichō Kachō (Junichi Kōmoto and Satoshi Inoue)
- Jungle Pocket (Shinji Saito, Hirohisa Ota and Otake)
- Kamaitachi (Ryuichi Hamaie and Kenji Yamauchi)
- King Kong (Akihiro Nishino and Yuta Kajiwara)
- Kirin (Akira Kawashima and Hiroshi Tamura)
- License (Kazuhiro Fujiwara and Takafumi Inomoto)
- London Boots (Atsushi Tamura and Ryō Tamura)
- Matenrō (Anthony and Otoni)
- Miki (Asei and Kosei)
- Nakagawake (Reiji and Tsuyoshi)
- Nankai Candies (Ryota Yamasato and Shizuyo Yamazaki)
- Morisanchū (Kazuko Kurosawa, Miyuki Oshima and Tomoko Murakami)
- Ninety-nine (Takashi Okamura and Hiroyuki Yabe)
- NON STYLE (Akira Ishida and Yusuke Inoue)
- Okazu Club (Ocarina and Yui P)
- Oriental Radio (Atsuhiko Nakada and Shingo Fujimori)
- Panther (Satoshi Mukai, Ryotaro Kan, Takahiro Ogata)
- Peace (Naoki Matayoshi and Yuji Ayabe)
- Penalty (Hide and Wakki)
- Razor Ramon (HG and RG)
- Regular (Kōta Matsumoto and Akihiro Nishikawa)
- Savanna (Shigeo Takahashi and Masumi Yagi)
- Shimofuri Myojo (Seiya and Soshina)
- Shinagawa Shoji (Hiroshi Shinagawa and Tomoharu Shoji)
- Super Maradona (Kazuhiro Tanaka and Takechi)
- Robert (Ryuji Akiyama, Hiroshi Yamamoto and Hiroyuki Baba)
- Rozan (Fuminori Ujihara and Hirofumi Suga)
- Taka and Toshi (Taka and Toshi)
- Trendy Angel (Tsukasa Saito and Takashi)
- Tutorial (Yoshimi Tokui and Mitsunori Fukuda)
- Universe (Hara and Kawase Meijin)
- Wagyu (Shinji Mizuta and Kenshiro Kawanishi)
- Waraimeshi (Koji Nishida and Tetsuo)
- Woman Rush Hour (Daisuke Muramoto and Paradise Nakagawa)
- Yasei Bakudan (Cookie and Rossy)

=== Recording artists ===
- NMB48
- Yoshimotozaka46
- Radio Fish
- Re:Complex
- Kawachiya Kikusuimaru
- Run&Gun
- Fayray
- Jealkb
- The Boom
- Yoyoka Soma
- OWV
- Rocket Punch
- Enjin
- Octpath

=== Actors/actresses ===
- Ayumi Beppu
- Hirohito Gotō
- Chizuru Ikewaki
- Asami Kawasaki
- Annu Mari
- Kumiko Nakano
- Ryo Nishikata
- Natsumi Ogawa
- Masi Oka
- Tetsuji Sakakibara
- Sōichirō Sorihashi
- Kozo Takeda

=== Others ===
- Ayaka Ichinose (gravure idol)
- Toshio Okada (Anime producer and author)
- Masahiko Katsuya (columnist and pundit)
- Shigefumi Matsuzawa (politician)
- Nobukazu Kuriki (mountaineer and entrepreneur)
- Kazuyuki Ishihara (garden designer)
- Kazuhisa Ishii (baseball commentator, ex-MLB pitcher)
- Kansei Nakano (politician)

== Property ==
Yoshimoto Kogyo is the owner of a number of corporate offices and stages, mostly situated in the downtown areas of Osaka and Tokyo. The company has two headquarters, Osaka HQ (大阪本部) and Tokyo HQ (東京本部) and a number of stages, namely Lumine the Yoshimoto (ルミネtheよしもと), 5 up Yoshimoto (5upよしもと), NMB48 Theater (NMB48劇場), Nanba Grand Kagetsu (なんばグランド花月), and the Yoshimoto Mugendai Hall (ヨシモト∞ホール) in Shibuya, Tokyo. Yoshimoto also had a comedy museum in downtown Osaka called Yoshimoto Shōtengai (吉本笑店街), but it closed in 2009.

== Other assets ==
Yoshimoto Kogyo also owns a community FM radio station, YES-fm 78.1 (callsign: JOZZ7AF-FM), based in Namba, Osaka and the television channel BS Yoshimoto.
