= Obata no Onīsan =

Japanese comedian

- おばたのお兄さん
- Born: Kazuki Obata; 5 June 1988 (age 37); Uonuma, Niigata Prefecture
- Education: Nippon Sport Science University
- Occupation: Comedian
- Years active: 2013–
- Agent: Yoshimoto Creative Agency Tokyo
- Style: Conte; monomane
- Height: 167 cm (5 ft 6 in)
- Spouse: Yuki Yamasaki (m. 2018)
- Partner(s): Naoto Ikeda (Hinode; ex-partner)

Obata no Onīsan (おばたのお兄さん; born 5 June 1988) is a Japanese comedian.

Obata's real name is Kazuki Obata (小幡 和貴, Obata Kazuki).

== Filmography ==
=== Television ===
Run	Title	Network	Notes	Ref.
Apr 2015 –	NHK Haiku "Haiku Saku Saku!"	NHK E	Fourth Sunday, 6:35–7:00	
26 Jun 2016	Nino-san	NTV		
26 Nov 2016	Chō Hamaru! Baku Show Character Parade	CX	Together with the Tosaki Kyōdai member Yuki, this day, together with Shun Oguri's impression of the double act Maron Maron organized; afterwards irregular appearances	
6 Jan 2017	Special research police JUMPolice	TX		
8 Feb 2017	Moshimono futari	CX		
22 Feb 2017	Wednesday Downtown	TBS		
1 Mar 2017	Onegai! Ranking	EX		
30 Mar 2017	Sakurai-Arioyshi: The Yakai	TBS		
8 Apr 2017	All-Star Thanksgiving	TBS		
13 May 2017	Meringue no Kimochi	NTV		
6 May, 2 Jun 2017	Bakushō sokkuri monomane Kōhaku Uta Gassen	CX		
	Sanma no Owarai Improvement Committee	CX	Regular	

== TBS of TV Vision ==
He joined SASUKE 39 at 28 December 2021.He has given number 66. He failed Stage 1 at Fish Bone.

He joined SASUKE 40 at 27 December 2022.He has given number 3938. He failed Stage 1 at Dragon Glider.
