= Tsukasa Saito =

Japanese actor and comedian (born 1979)

- 斎藤 司
- Born: 15 February 1979 (age 47); Machida, Tokyo, Japan
- Education: Nihon University Faculty of Commerce Department of Commerce

Comedy career
- Years active: 2004–

Tsukasa Saito (斎藤 司, Saitō Tsukasa; born 15 February 1979) is a comedian from Yokohama, Kanagawa Prefecture. He performs boke in the comedy duo Trendy Angel with Takashi.

== Personal life ==
He was born in Machida, Tokyo, and raised in Aobadai, Yokohama after living in Saginuma, Kawasaki.

He graduated from Yokohama Municipal Nara Junior High School, Nihon University High School, and Nihon University Faculty of Commerce Department of Commerce.

After working part-time in the sales department of a recruitment magazine, he worked for two years in a part-time job at Rakuten. At the age of 25 he decided to become an entertainer.

After leaving Rakuten, he entered Yoshimoto General Performing Arts College (NSC). In 2004, he formed the comedy duo "Trendy Angel" with his classmate Takashi.

When Saito was a high school student, he lost his mother at the age of 38 because of breast cancer, and since then he grew up in his father's family. He has a younger brother and a sister.

His IQ test on the TV Asahi series broadcast on 1 January 2016 Geinōjin Kakuzuke Check 2016 Dai Yosen-kai showed a high value of 132.

He announced his marriage on 24 December 2017. As a comedian he has gained popularity through television shows and commercials.

== Appearances ==
=== Current appearance programmes ===
Regular

- Cream Quiz Miracle 9 (EX, Nov 2015 –)*Prior to October 2016 quasi-regular
- Uchimura Terrace (NTV, 22 Jan 2016 –)

Special programmes

- R-1 Grand Prix 2015 (CX, 10 Feb 2015)
- Ippon Grand Prix (CX, 23 May 2015)
- R-1 Grand Prix 2016 (CX, 6 Mar 2016)

=== TV dramas ===
- Jūhan Shuttai! Episode 4 (3 May 2016, TBS) – as Mikio Tamachi
- Kurokawa no Techō (2017, EX) – as Tsukasa Saito (himself)*Episode 1 guest
- Minshū no Teki –Yononaka, Okashikunaidesu ka!?– (2017, CX) – as Ryutaro Sonoda

=== Films ===
- Mixed Doubles (released 21 Oct 2017) – as Ishihara

=== Theatre ===
- Les Miserables (2019-2021, 2024-2025) – as Thenardier
- Grease (2021) – as Teen Angel
- The Fantasticks (2022) – as Hucklebee
- Matilda (2023) – Mr. Wormwood

=== Internet TV ===
- Hitoshi Matsumoto presents Documental (2017, Amazon Prime Video) – Season 0, Season 1

=== Advertisements ===
- Kirin "Tanrei Gokujō <Nama>" (2016)
- Toyota "Esquire" (2016)
- Aflac "Byōki ya Kega de Hatarakenaku natta toki no Kyūyo Support Hoken"
- Meiji Ugai Gusuri "Utatte iru Kaba-san wa Dare? Twitter Campaign" (2016)

=== Music videos ===
- Sonar Pocket "One-Sided Love" (18 May 2016)

=== Dubbing ===
- Sing (2017) – as Gunther
- Men in Black: International (2019) – as Pawny
- Sing 2 (2022) – as Gunther

== Discography ==
- Perry Raikō feat. Trendy Angel Saito – Collaboration song in Egu-splosion's album CD/E.
- Shake It Off – Collaboration song used in the film Sing. Reese Witherspoon & Nick Kroll (Maaya Sakamoto & Tsukasa Saito)
- Break Free (Japanese version) – Collaboration song used in Sing 2: Original Motion Picture Soundtrack — Alternative version (Maaya Sakamoto & Tsukasa Saito)

=== Songwriting ===
- Kabuto "one step"

=== Productions ===
- Color Creation (From Saito-Genking's "Nanka Yarou!" first planning)
