= Mecha-Mecha Iketeru! =

Japanese television series

Mecha-Mecha Iketeru! (めちゃ²イケてるッ!; transl. What a Cool We Are! [sic]) was a popular Japanese variety show, shown on Fuji TV. The first episode aired on 16 October 1996 and the last episode aired on 31 March 2018. The hosts of the show were the owarai duo Ninety-Nine (Takashi Okamura and Hiroyuki Yabe). The show was also known as Mecha-Ike (めちゃイケ).

== Regulars ==
The regular members of the show are:

- Ninety-Nine (Takashi Okamura and Hiroyuki Yabe)
- Yoiko (Shinya Arino and Masaru Hamaguchi)
- Gokuraku Tombo (Koji Kato and Keiichi Yamamoto)
- Oasiz (Yasuko Mitsuura, Kayoko Okubo)
- Shinji Takeda
- Akiko Hinagata
- Sarina Suzuki
- Jaru-jaru (Shusuke Fukutoku, Junpei Goto)
- Tanpopo (Emiko Kawamura, Kumiko Shiratori)
- Atsushi
- Satomi Shigemori
- Motokatsu Sannaka

Egashira 2:50 also appears as a semi-regular guest.

Kayoko Ookubo of Oasiz joined as a regular member starting in the year 2000 though her partner Yasuko Mitsuura had been a regular since the beginning.

On July 19, 2006, during Ibaraki Golden Golds exhibition road trip to Hokkaidō, Keiichi Yamamoto of Gokuraku Tombo was charged with sexual assault on a 17-year-old girl. Yamamoto ultimately forced to leave the show and the showbiz, as He was dismissed from Yoshimoto Kōgyō in that same day.

Auditions for new regular members were held in 2010, while Okamura was recovering from his illness. The winners and new regular members were Jaru-jaru (Shusuke Fukutoku, Junpei Goto), Tanpopo (Emiko Kawamura, Kumiko Shiratori), Atsushi, Satomi Shigemori, and Motokatsu Sannaka.

In 2010, Takashi Okamura of Ninety-Nine left the show for a few months in order to recover from an unspecified illness.

In 2016, Motokatsu Sannaka or usually called by "San-chan" graduate from Mechaike to be a Geinin.

In 2018, Keiichi Yamamoto returned the show.

== Corners ==
The show consists of a varied selection of games (called corners) and comedy sketches in a format that is relatively typical of popular Japanese comedy themed variety shows, though many of the games are never played more than once. Generally each show introduces one special guest, and they take a central role in most of the games.

The following is a list of a few corners that were played on the show.

=== Shichinin no Shiritori Zamurai ===
"Seven Shiritori Zamurai" (七人のしりとり侍, Shichinin no Shiritori Zamurai)

The players, dressed as the 'seven samurai', play the shiritori word game with three-syllable words. The next player takes the last syllable of the previous word in order to form another word. A player is punished when word said does not exist or the other players object to the word.

- Yabe (leader): Kanbee (勘兵衛, Kanbee)
- Katō: Kyuzo (九蔵, Kyūzō)
- Hamaguchi: Heihachi (平八, Heihachi)
- Arino: Gorobee (五郎兵衛, Gorobee)
- Yamamoto: Shichiroji (七郎次, Shichirōji)
- Takeda: Katsushiro (勝四郎, Katsushirō)
- Okamura: Kikuchiyo (菊千代, Kikuchiyo)

=== Bakusou kazutori-dan ===
(単位上等!爆走数取団, "Vroom counter game")

Due to the occasionally complex nature of Japanese counter words, there are certain simple games that can be played exploiting the difficulties in choosing the correct counter word, which is the basis of this game. Usually only male cast members play this game, as the punishment for losing is quite harsh, although members of female trio Mori San-chū have participated in the past. Each member plays as a different character showing typical Rock and Roll and Rockabilly stereotypes. They are parodies of Kishidan. Their characters are listed below in order of introduction:

- Yabe (leader): Shō (翔, Shō)
- Katō: Ken (拳, Ken)
- Hamaguchi: Masaru (優, Masaru)
- Arino: Jimmy (ジミー, Jimī)
- Yamamoto: Hikaru (Hikaru Ijuin) (光（伊集院 光）, Hikaru (Ijūin Hikaru))
- Takeda: Johnny (ジョニー, Jonī)
- Okamura: Mickey (Satoshi Miki) (ミッキー（三木 聡）, Mikkī (Miki Satoshi))
- Atsushi: Atsushi (敦士, Atsushi)
- Fukutoku: Fukutoku (Hebiji) (福徳(へび次), Fukutoku (Hebiji))
- Goto: Minami (みなみ, Minami)
- Guest: Variable(usually addressed as 'aniki')

They all meet in a bar named Snack Mugendai (スナック∞, Sunakku Mugendai) which is modeled after a famous Japanese drama, Kinpachi Sensei, and after each member introduces himself, the game begins.

The members are seated on motorcycles, arranged in a circle on a rotating platform. The first player starts the game with the onomatopoeia of an engine revving. As the platform rotates, the member directly in front of the camera must first quote a quantity (starting from one) including a counter (for example i-ppon, 1本, which counts 1 long slender item; for example, a pencil) and then quote an object for the next person in line to count (for example "paper", which would be thus counted as ni-mai, 2枚, mai being the counter for flat objects). This whole process must follow the rhythm of a chant (mostly consisting of repetitions of bun-bun ("vroom", the sounds of a motorcycle revving) which gets faster as the game progresses. It becomes difficult to decide (with very little time to think) which counter to use (hon, mai, ko, etc.) when players are given awkward objects, such as mountains or wigs.

Any player who fails to give the correct counter is put up against one or more aggressive sumo rikishi who then humiliate them. With repeat failure players often have a "secret seal" smacked onto their skin which has some sort of embarrassing image on it, and is always censored on screen. Since regular members of the show have experience playing the game, guests are often more likely to make mistakes.

After the punishment is finished, the game is restarted.

This corner has not been aired since Keiichi Yamamoto was sacked from the show. It has since been replaced by Irotori Ninja.

=== Irotori Ninja ===
"Colour taking Ninja" (只今参上!色とり忍者, Tadaima Sanjō! Irotori Ninja)

The players are dressed as ninja with their own colours. Their character names also have colours. Guests are dressed differently.

The game is started with 'shu shu shushushu' (the sound of flying shuriken). The first player starts with a topic (e.g. yellow fruit), and the next player has to answer with the correct item (e.g. pineapple) before giving a topic of their own. The exception is the topic 'blue feelings', where the next player answer with a situation that makes him feel down.

- Yabe (white): Shirozaemon (白佐衛門, Shirozaemon)
- Katō (red): Akabee (赤兵衛, Akabee)
- Hamaguchi (yellow): Kitaro (黄太郎, Kitarō)
- Arino (green): Midokichi (緑吉, Midokichi)
- Takeda (purple): Murasakimaru (紫丸, Murasakimaru)
- Okamura (blue): Aosuke (青助, Aosuke)
- Guest: Variable(usually addressed as 'sensei')

=== Mechaggington ===
"Mechaggington" (めちゃギントン, Mechaginton)

Parody of Chuggington, a British animated series. The players dress up as trains. In this game, following the rhythm, a player replies with the onomatopoeia of the topic given by the previous player. An answer is allowed if everyone agrees with it. However, if objections are raised or a player stumbled over his answer, the train bell will ring. The losing player is then subjected to a punishment by being hoisted into a full train car of big sized men for around half a minute.

- Yabe: Wilson Hiroyuki
- Kato: Brewster Koji
- Atsushi: Chatsworth Atsushi
- Goto: Hodge Junpei
- Arino: Olwin Shinya
- Fukutoku: M'tambo Fukutoku
- Hamaguchi: Koko Masaru
- Okamura: Pete Takashi
- Guests: Some guests appear dressed as trains like the regulars, some guests appear in their normal clothes.

Cocorico's Endo Shozo and Tanaka Naoki, EXILE, Funasshi, Murakami Shoji, Jimmy Onishi, Sanma Akashiya, Atsushi Tamura, and model Lola have participated as guests of the Mechagginton corner. Atsushi Tamura who guested together with Lola took her place in the punishment if she got the answer wrong.

==== Mechagginton 2 ====
In Mechagginton 2 (or the 'second season of Mechagginton), children become part of the audience and participants in the game. The difference between the first and second version of this game is the punishment. A group of demons brandishing large fans (harisen) burst into the room, threatening the group and the loser. If the loser is a child, the demons proceed to hoist the child to scare them. The loser comedian is either subjected to a scare or, for most cases, a slap on the head with the fan.

==== Mechagginton app ====
Only available for download on Japan's Apple's Appstore or Android's Google Play store, the Mechagginton app features a rhythm game where the player must match the correct onomatopoeia to the object displayed in the center of the screen. The app has been downloaded over a million times.

=== Stamp 8 ===
This corner parodies the famous dance troupe Stomp. The cast all have their own American personae (complete with fake nose and strange English mutterings) and are assisted by the voice of Thane Camus who is an American born Japanese talent and acts as the announcer for this game. The names for each of the casts personae are:

- Yamamoto (leader): Luke
- Okamura: Michael (modeled after Michael Jackson)
- Hamaguchi: Paul
- Yabe: Carl
- Arino: Steve
- Katō: David

Not so much a game as an excuse to abuse each other, the characters all start by performing stupid tricks with a broom, after which Yamamoto tosses an 8-sided die with each of the characters names written on one side. The "loser" (person whose name lands face-up) approaches center-stage, and after small chant is whacked in the face by all of the other members with large paper fans, the largest of which is held by Yamamoto, or if Yamamoto happens to be the loser, Katō. The fake noses that each member wears may or may not provide some protection against the blow, though since the fans are made out of paper the momentum of the blow is probably relatively small.

=== Yama Oku ~ Buta no Ran ===
This corner parodies the opening sequence of the period drama, Ooku - Hana no Ran. Yamamoto portrays as the shogun, Yama-sama, walking down the reception hall where he is being received by the bowing handmaidens of Yama Oku, portrayed by the other members of the show. As he passes by the members, he picks one of the members and tries to make them laugh. If a member laughs, a punishment is then followed. The punishment is considerably lighter than other Mecha-Ike games hence the participation of the women of the show in this corner.

=== Synchronized Eating ===
A joke game based on the Olympic sport of synchronized swimming, the participants of this game must simultaneously (as a team) guess the type of food that they are given while their eyes are closed and noses are plugged. Often they will stand in some sort of strange pose (supposedly inspired by synchronized swimming). Each "team" consists of 2 players for a normal episode and 5 members for a special episode, representing the Olympic synchronized team of a country. If even one member of the team guesses wrong they are given a result of "Maicching" (probably a pun using mai, 昧, meaning "vague" and ching from "matching") and the floor opens dropping them into the ice cold water below. If they all guess correctly, they are given a result of "Matching". If they all guess incorrectly, but all guess the same food, they are given a result of "Synchro-Maiching" and are dropped into the icy water while being sprayed with icy water from a hose. After removing themselves from the cold water, their only recourse is a small pool of steaming hot water.

The following are some of the names of some of the international characters each member plays:

- Russia: Katō (K. Katoski) and Arino (S. Arinov)
- China: Ōkubo (Hung-Little) and Mitsuura (Hung-Big)
- USA: Okamura (Janet Okamura) and Haranishi Takayuki (Whitney Haranishi)

=== Quiz $ Majionair ===
Parody of the Japanese version of Who Wants to Be a Millionaire?. Okamura's character, the MC, is called Oka Monta, parodying Monta Mino.

=== Fuji TV Police 24 Hours ===
Parody of Police 24 Hours, a Japanese show similar to Cops, but focused on the activities of Japanese police. Okamura, Kato, Hamaguchi and Yabe are dressed as policemen of Fuji TV, going around "arresting" celebrities in and around Fuji TV.

== Special episodes ==
The show also broadcasts special episodes, which generally last two to four hours.

=== End of Term Exam ===
The guests on these specials are given an innocuous-sounding work assignment or a scheduled appearance at a certain place. When they turn up, however, they find themselves walking onto a set rigged out as a makeshift classroom. They are then told that they will be taking a middle school level end-of-term exam (in school uniform, no less) on Japanese, mathematics, science, society (which covers geography and history in Western curricula) and English. Each test for each subject lasts 50 minutes.

At the end of the exam, the "teacher" and his assistant (Takashi Okamura and Fuji TV announcer Mizuki Sano) grade the papers and go about ridiculing the incorrect answers. After this, the test rankings are announced starting from the top and lowest-scoring person is eventually named and crowned in a special mock ceremony.

Past guests have included Rinka, Egashira 2:50, Kuniko Asagi, Chinatsu Wakatsuki, Sonim, members of Morning Musume, and members of AKB48. Occasionally, some of Mechaike's own members are themselves duped into playing, mainly for comic effect and to round out the bottom of the test rankings.

Eighteen editions of End of Term Exams have taken place. To date, Akemi Darenogare, a Brazilian-born Japanese personality who participated in the 16th edition of the End of Term Exams featuring female personalities, is considered the worst scoring with a score of 192. Fuji TV television presenter Rei Kikukawa, who partook in the 14th edition of the End of Term Exams celebrating Fuji TV's 55 years of television broadcast, has the highest score of 459.

The End of Term Exams led to several running gags. Yasuko Mitsura portrays herself as a high-scoring, overachieving teacher's pet while, Koji Kato is considered a math wiz of the group, once scoring 100 on the mathematics portion of the exam. Yabe Hiroyuki, the tsukkomi of Ninety-nine, performs poorly during the test, further solidifying a perception that he is the weaker member of group compared to the livelier Okamura Takeshi, the boke of Ninety-nine. Masaru Hamaguchi repeatedly scores poorly in the exams, always coming in last during the test except in one instance where the last place went to Satomi Shigemori, another member of the show. Hamaguchi's most memorable moment during the test was when he spelled his name as Hamaguche rather than Hamaguchi in the English portion of the exams. His performance during the tests solidify his natural airheadedness compared to his role of the tsukkomi in Yoiko.

In 2013, an exam episode featuring 15 AKB48 members was filmed with the 7 lowest-scoring girls forming the AKB48 sub-unit "Baka 7" (Idiot 7); a play on words of "Kami 7". The member with the absolute lowest exam score would also be awarded the position of group center. The taping of this episode also led to the creation of the song for AKB48 called "HASUTE TO WASUTE" which is in reference to AKB48 member Kawaei Rina misunderstanding the idiom "haste makes waste" for two people named Hasute and Wasute.

=== Okamura offer series ===
Offers are made to Mecha-Ike for Okamura to try various things. He wears a blue sports jersey outfit with his name on the chest. The offers he has completed are on the sleeve of the outfit. The offers are mostly physical, as Okamura has great athletic ability.

1. Johnny's Jr - performing in SMAP's concert (1997)
2. Guest appearance in drama 'Brothers' (1998)
3. MC for a wedding ceremony (1998)
4. Spring hidden ability tournament (1998)
5. Horse racing showdown(1999)
6. Full marathon (1999-2000) *dec 31 till jan 1
7. Lion King musical (2000)
8. Morning Musume school field trip (2001) (*also part of the OkaJo series)
9. Boxing showdown with Gushiken Yoko (2004)
10. Golf showdown with Yokomine Sakura (2005)
11. EXILE (2007)
12. Tennis showdown with Sugiyama Ai (2008)
13. Perform in a Kabuki show (2013)
14. EXILE (2013)

=== Yabe offer series ===
Offers are made by Mecha-Ike for Yabe to try various things. He wears a red sports jersey outfit with his name on the chest. The offers he has completed are on the sleeve of the outfit.

1. Assistant Director on Mezamashi TV (1999)
2. Ryokan (2000)
3. Reporter (2000)
4. Detective (2001)
5. Manager to Akiko Wada in HoriPro (2002)
6. Sushi shop Kappa Sushi (2003)
7. Yakiniku shop Anrakutei (2004)
8. Gyoza no Oushou (2005)
9. Ameya Kocho (2006)
10. Manager (2007)
11. Patisserie (2008)
12. Bakery (2009)
13. Help AKB48 behind the scenes (2012)
