= Kyushu Asahi Broadcasting =

Radio and TV station in Fukuoka

KBC Group Holdings Co., Ltd.

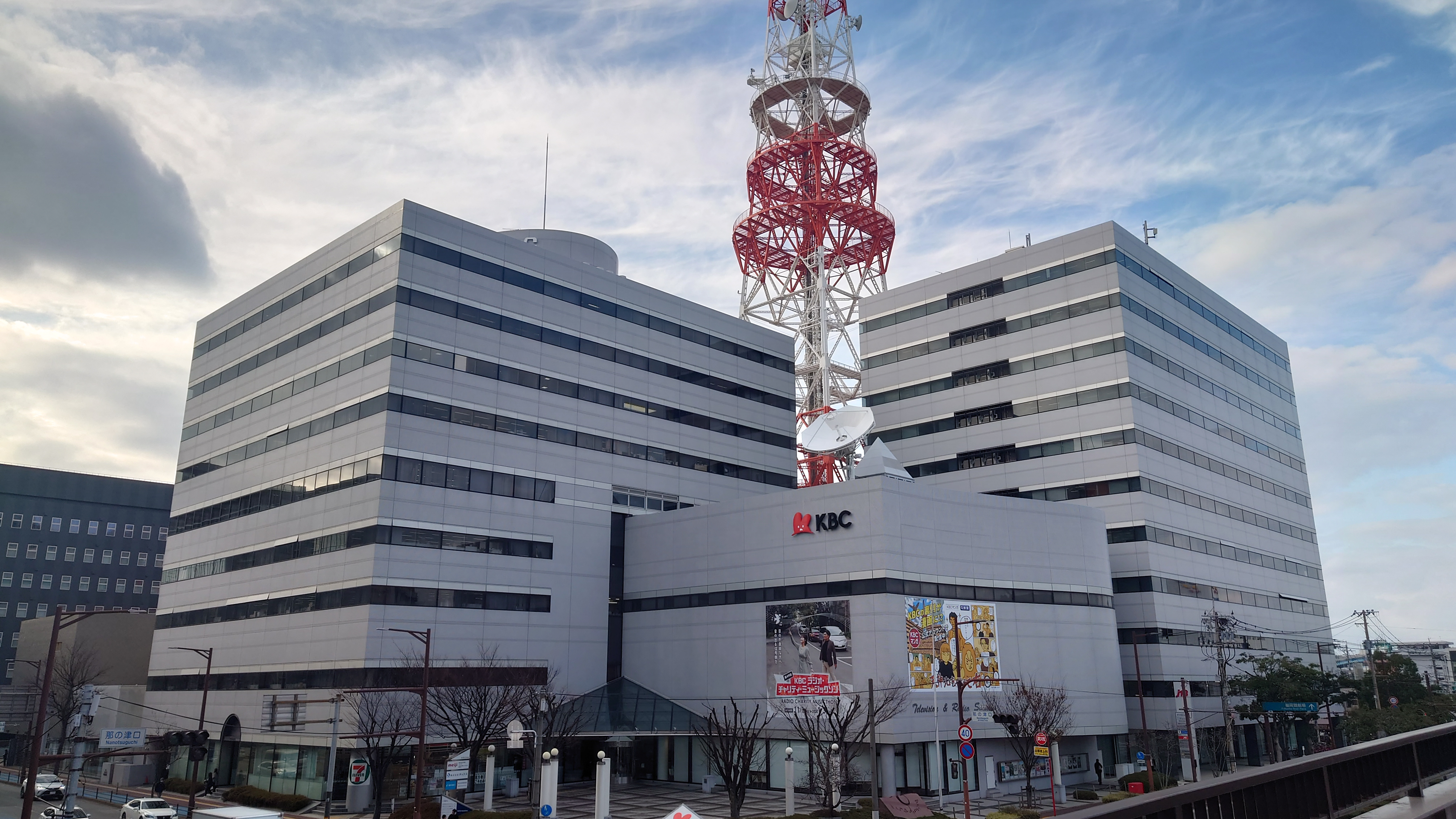
- Headquarters in Chūō-ku, Fukuoka
- Native name: KBCグループホールディングス株式会社
- Romanized name: KBC Gurūpu Hōrudingusu
- Formerly: Kyushu Asahi Broadcasting Co., Ltd. (1953-2023)
- Type: kabushiki gaisha
- Industry: Media
- Founded: 21 August 1953; 73 years ago
- Headquarters: Nagahama, Chūō, Fukuoka City, Fukuoka Prefecture, Japan
- Key people: Yasushi Waki (President & CEO)
- Services: Broadcast television; Radio
- Owner: The Asahi Shimbun (19.20%); TV Asahi Holdings Corporation (4.00%)
- Subsidiaries: Kyushu Asahi Broadcasting
- Website: kbc.co.jp/kbc-ghd/

JOIF
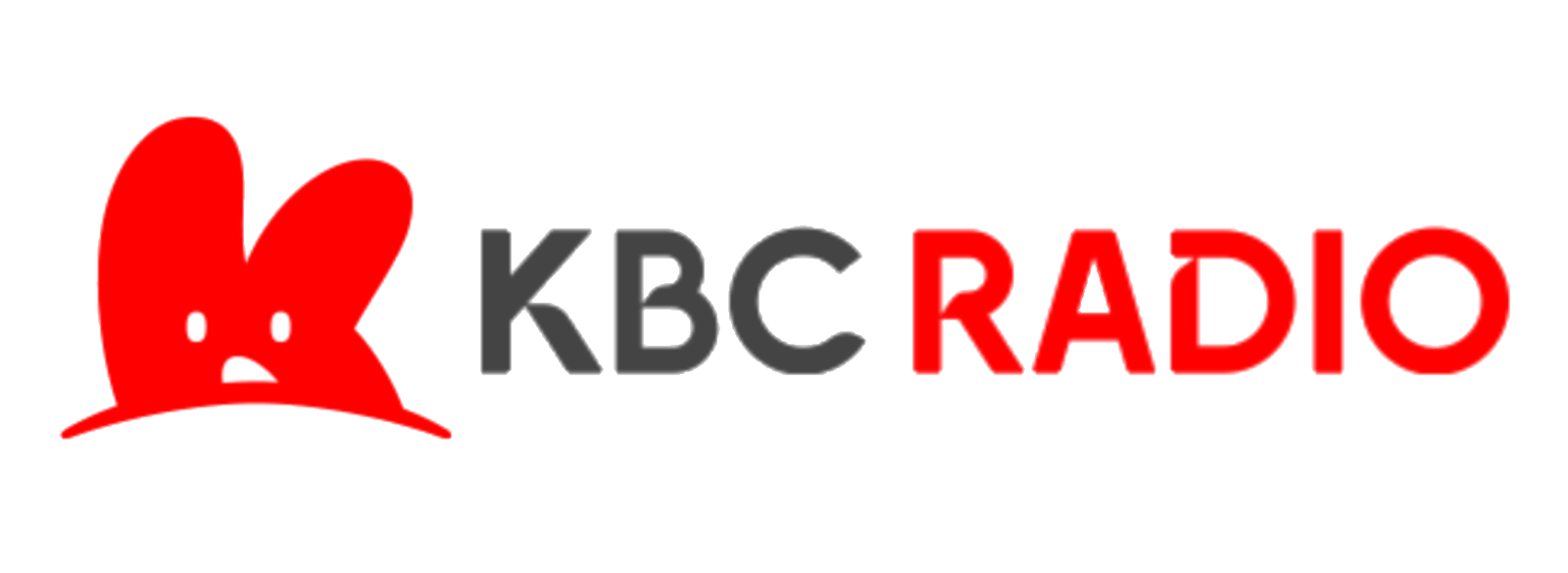
- Fukuoka; Japan
- Broadcast area: Fukuoka Prefecture
- Frequencies: 1413 kHz (AM); 90.2 MHz (FM)
- Branding: KBC Radio

Programming
- Language: Japanese
- Format: Talk, Sports
- Affiliations: National Radio Network

Ownership
- Owner: Kyushu Asahi Broadcasting Co., Ltd.

History
- First air date: January 1, 1954
- Call sign meaning: Ichi (1) Fukuoka

Technical information
- Licensing authority: MIC
- Power: 50 kW

Links
- Webcast: Radiko
- Website: kbc.co.jp/radio/

JOIF-DTV
- Logo used since 2023
- Fukuoka Prefecture; Japan
- City: Fukuoka
- Channels: Digital: 31 (UHF); Virtual: 1
- Branding: KBC Television

Programming
- Affiliations: All-Nippon News Network

Ownership
- Owner: Kyushu Asahi Broadcasting Co., Ltd.

History
- First air date: March 1, 1959
- Former call signs: JOIF-TV (1959–2011)
- Former channel numbers: Analog: 1 (VHF, 1959–2011)
- Former affiliations: Fuji TV (1 March 1959–30 September 1964)
- Call sign meaning: Ichi (Channel 1) Fukuoka

Technical information
- Licensing authority: MIC
- Transmitter coordinates: 33°35′35.7″N 130°21′5.3″E

Links
- Website: kbc.co.jp/tv/

Corporate information
- Native name: 九州朝日放送株式会社
- Romanized name: Kyūshū Asahi Hōsō Kabushiki Gaisha
- Type: Subsidiary
- Industry: Radio and television network
- Founded: 1 April 2022 (as Kyushu Asahi Broadcasting Split Preparation Co., Ltd.)
- Headquarters: Fukuoka Prefecture
- Owner: KBC Group Holdings
- Website: kbc.co.jp

Kyushu Asahi Broadcasting Co., Ltd. (九州朝日放送株式会社, Kyūshū Asahi Hōsō Kabushiki Gaisha) is a broadcasting station in Fukuoka, Japan, affiliated with National Radio Network (NRN) on radio and All-Nippon News Network (ANN) on TV.

With its relay transmitters in Saga, KBC functions as the default ANN affiliate for the said prefecture, as that area does not have an ANN affiliate of its own.

== History ==
=== Early history ===
After the establishment of the "Three Radio Laws" (Radio Law, Broadcasting Law, and Radio Supervisory Committee Establishment Law) in 1950, Japan established a system where public broadcasting (NHK) and commercial broadcasting coexisted.

Among the 16 companies that were able to receive the license, two of them are from Fukuoka Prefecture: Radio Kyushu (later renamed RKB Mainichi Broadcasting) and Nishinippon Broadcasting (not related to RNC in Kagawa Prefecture). However, due to the latter failing to raise enough funds, the license was then returned in January 1952. But the then founders of Nishinippon Broadcasting, Shigetomo Nakahara, did not give up and applied for a radio broadcasting license in 1953, which was then granted on May of the same year. With financial support from the Asahi Shimbun, Nishinippon Broadcasting was then renamed to Kyushu Asahi Broadcasting on 18 August 1953.

=== Founding ===
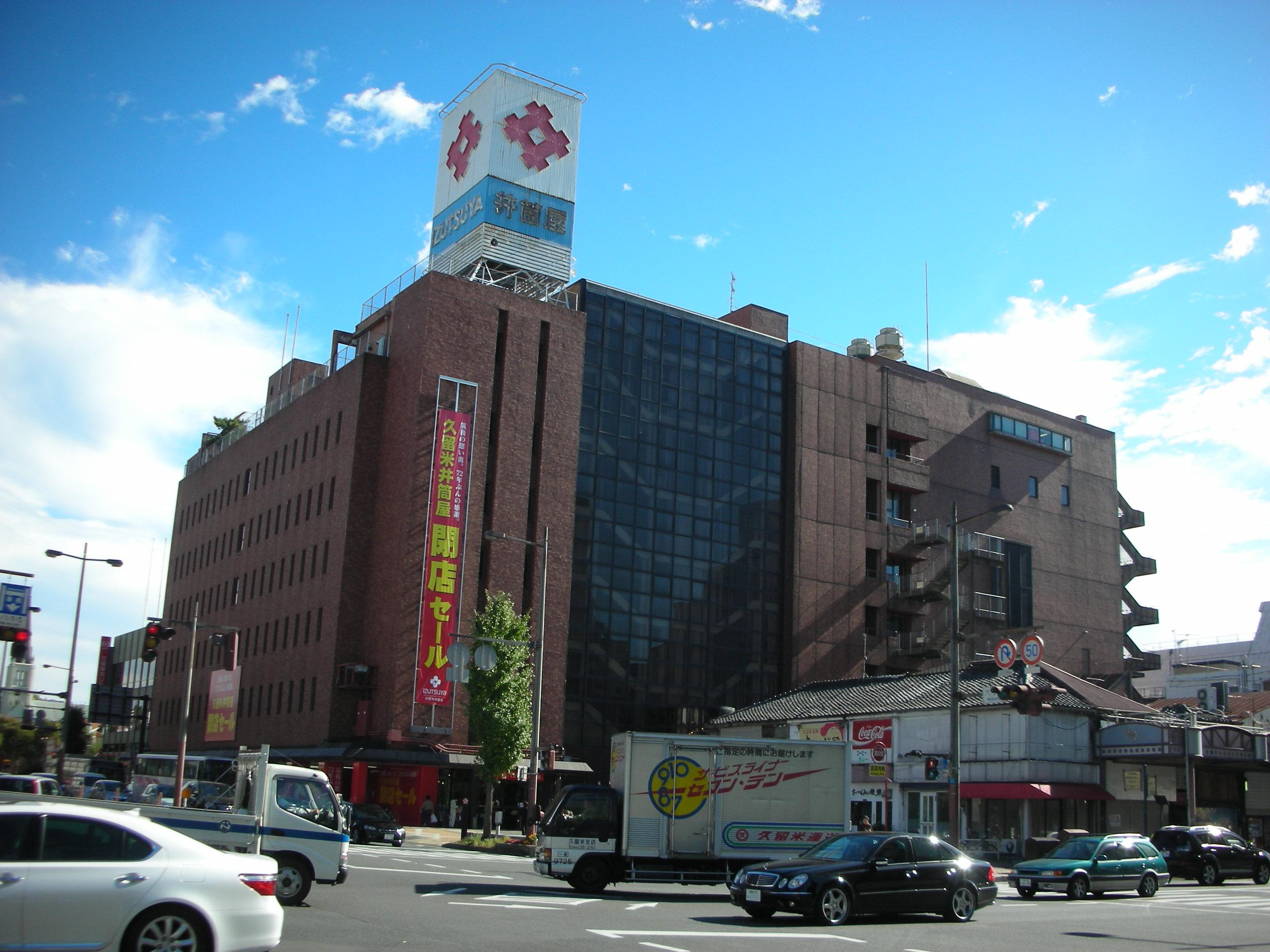
The Asahiya Department Store (later Kurume Izutsuya) which was the initial headquarters of KBC until it moved to Fukuoka City in 1956. The building closed down in February 2009 and was later demolished.

Kyushu Asahi Broadcasting then opened on 21 August 1953 with its headquarters initially located in the Asahiya Department Store in Kurume City. On 24 December 1953, KBC began trial radio broadcasts, which officially started broadcasting on New Year's Day of 1954.

In 1956, KBC received an expansion license for its radio broadcast to extend its coverage to whole of Fukuoka.As part of its radio expansion, they permanently moved their headquarters to the Hananoseki Building in Nakasu, Fukuoka City on 30 November 1956.

=== Expansion to television broadcasting ===
In October 1956, KBC applied for a TV broadcasting license for the Fukuoka City and Kokura areas. However, at that time, multiple companies applied for a TV license in the prefecture. Under the mediation of the Ministry of Post (currently the Ministry of Internal Affairs and Communications), KBC received their license on 22 October 1957.

After obtaining their license, KBC then planned to move its headquarters to Nagahama, Fukuoka City in order to meet the facility requirements for TV broadcasting. Prior to the start of TV broadcasting, KBC management made it clear it will broadcast as a dual affiliate to both Fuji TV and Nippon Educational Television (NET) (current TV Asahi). On 15 July 1958, KBC established its relay transmitter in Kokura City in Kitakyushu as part of its preparations for TV broadcasting.

KBC started its TV operations on 1 March 1959 at 10am. At that time it allotted to air at least 70% of programs from Nippon Educational Television and 30% of programs from Fuji TV. In July 1961, KBC obtained another license for the whole of Kitakyushu City in Fukuoka and started to place its relay transmitters on Mount Sarakura. Fuji TV programming has been dropped completely on the TV schedules of KBC on 1 October 1964 after Television Nishinippon decided to become a Fuji TV affiliate. This resulted to the increase of the time allotment for NET programming to 78%, with local programming increased to 22%. Color TV started on 1 April 1967.

In 1969, the Fukuoka District Court requested four television stations, including KBC (the other three being RKB Mainichi Broadcasting, Television Nishinippon, and NHK Fukuoka), to submit news footage of college students protesting the docking of a U.S. nuclear-powered aircraft carrier at Sasebo Port, but Kyushu Asahi Broadcasting refused to do so on the grounds that it infringed on press freedom. The newsreel was returned in December of the same year.

=== 1970s - present ===
In 1978, KBC opened its first ANN News Bureau in Vienna. KBC started TV broadcasting in stereo sound since 1982. On 1 April 1987, KBC opened its current headquarters. KBC then achieved broadcasting for 24 hours everyday since 1 April 1996. KBC started digital TV broadcasting on 1 December 2006 and stopped analog broadcasting on 24 July 2011. As of 1 April 2023, KBC became a certified holding company. As a result, KBC became an indirect subsidiary of KBC Group Holdings.

== Programming ==
During its early years on TV, KBC produced a short 15 minute local news bulletin. In 1978, KBC began airing a proper local news bulletin which was named as KBC News Plaza. Currently their local news program is known as Shiritaka!, which started airing in 2018.

- Asadesu(アサデス。)
- Super J Channel Kyushu/Okinawa(スーパーJチャンネル 九州･沖縄)
- KBC News Pia(KBCニュースピア)
- Kyushu Kaido Story
- Ruriiro no Sunadokei(るり色の砂時計)
- Fukuoka Marathon
- National High School Baseball Fukuoka Regional Tournament
- Vana H Cup KBC Augusta
