= Cow Television =

Japanese Internet television service

Cow Television is an Internet television service based in Fukuoka, Japan.

== History ==
Cow Television was founded by Yasunori Takahashi. Takahashi worked with Fukuoka-based Fuji News Network and Fuji Network System affiliate Television Nishinippon Corporation for eight years and wrote over 3000 news and documentary scripts.

On February 1, 2005, Cow Television was launched as a joint-venture with Takahashi's Spinout, and three other companies: Starbrand, Nextberry, and Kataoka Kikaku.

In September 2007, Cow Television parted from Spinout, becoming a separate company, Cow Television Incorporated.

On August 15, 2010, Cow Television HK was established to support Japanese businesses in Hong Kong.

== Timeline ==
Year	Event
2004	May - Establishment of Spinout Incorporated
2005	September - Wins Fukuoka Business Contest Step-up Prize February - Establishment of Cow Television
2007	September - Cow Television spun-off from company Spinout Inc. August - Introduction of Video Newsletter
2008	June - Start of "My Company TV" May - Relocation of Fukuoka Office
2010	August - Opening of Cow Television HK June - Wins the Kyushu Entrepreneur Prize
2011	November - Start of the Moti-up Theatre
2012	February - Start of Moti-up Early Morning Study Group
2013	December - Participation in the Okubo Hideo Academy
2014	July - 10th Anniversary, Establishment of Tokyo Office
2015	July - Relocation of Fukuoka Main Office April - Start of Moti-up lectures at Kyushu Sangyo University
2016	August - Relocation of Tokyo Office

== Programs ==
=== My Company TV ===
My Company TV was started in 2008. It used a business model where video copyright was rented to companies featured in the programs. Videos were released through Cow Television's system and through the featured companies' home page(s).

Until 2014, the programs were hosted on FLV servers. However, heavy traffic caused the servers to overload and a change was made from FLV to YouTube in 2015.

=== The President's Office 101 ===
While there are many interview programs in Japan featuring corporate leaders, Cow Television was one of the first to use the one-on-one CEO interview series format.

=== Corporate Documentaries ===
Cow Television produces documentaries that aim to cover the motivation behind business leaders and employees in the field and convey the same to the viewers.

As of 2016, Cow Television has produced documentaries for over 70 companies, around 50 of which are in the Fukuoka area.

== CSR ==
=== Moti-up Early Morning Study Group ===
In November 2011, Moti-up Theatre, a web-based video service for studying business was started. The videos feature interviews with corporate leaders from leading firms. In February 2012, a study group (the Moti-up Early Morning Study Group) using these videos, was established. In this study group, participants from different industries and fields watch the video content and discuss how they can apply the lessons that they have learned to their respective fields.

=== Moti-up as a University Lecture ===
Moti-up as a University Lecture began when Kyushu Sangyo University (KSU) saw that the program could be applied to a university environment, wherein students could learn the business as well as discussion and presentation skills. KSU adopted Moti-up on an experimental basis in 2015, and then formally adopted the program as a general education course in 2016.

=== Internship ===
Since its establishment, Cow Television has accepted student interns. As of November 2016, over 190 students have taken part in its internship program. The internship program is designed to teach students about interviews, video production from camera work, and editing and project development.

== Awards ==
- 2010 - Kyushu Entrepreneur Prize
- 2005 - Fukuoka Step-up Prize

== External links (in Japanese) ==
- Cow Television
- Moti-up Early Morning Study Group
