= GameCenter CX: 3-Chōme no Arino =

2014 video game

GameCenter CX: 3-Choume no Arino
- Developer: G.rev
- Publisher: Bandai Namco Games (Note: Released under the Bandai brand.)
- Series: Retro Game Challenge
- Platform: Nintendo 3DS
- Release: March 20, 2014
- Genre: Minigame
- Modes: Single-player, multiplayer

GameCenter CX: 3-Chōme no Arino (ゲームセンターCX 3丁目の有野, Gēmu Sentā Shī Ekkusu San-Chōme no Arino) is the third game in the Retro Game Challenge series, known as GameCenter CX in Japan. It was developed by G.rev and published by Bandai Namco Games. Like its predecessor, Retro Game Challenge 2, it was released solely in Japan for the Nintendo 3DS on March 20, 2014, due to low Western sales of the series' first game. Unlike the second entry, it has not received an English fan translation.

Similar to the previous two games, it is based on the television show GameCenter CX starring Shinya Arino, and revolves around the player having to play a variety of minigames styled after genres of retro games. The game was well received by Japanese critics, but had a less positive reaction in the West, with reviewers calling it inferior to the previous two games due to a switch to 2D graphics on the overworld and worse-quality minigames.

== Development ==
In 2013, Xseed Games confirmed that they passed on localizing the game into English, responding to a fan's question that, despite having the desire to, their "bank would cry" if they decided to do so.

== Release ==
The game received a free demo on the Nintendo eShop in February 2014, and the full game was released on March 20 for 5,480 yen.

== Reception ==
In Japan, the game received a total score of 32/40 from Famitsu, with the reviewers praising the game's increased emphasis on story, as well as the game's use of the 3DS's features and online multiplayer elements. They called each game "simple but fun", saying the game created a heavy sense of nostalgia, but criticized some parts that did not allow button inputs.

In the West, feedback from critics was more negative, with Daan Koopman of Nintendo World Report saying in a preview that his excitement for the game had vanished when he saw it in action, adding that he was turned off severely from the game due to the change in developers. Calling the overworld's new 2D look "awful for the series" and "laughable", he described it as not "lovely on the eyes". Stating that the minigame he played was "not very interesting", he noted that the game in general "did not leave a strong first impression", concluding that he would rather go back and replay the previous two games, and that he would cancel his plans to download the game on launch day.

Chris Kohler of Wired was even more negative about the game, calling it "horrible" and saying that he wanted to pretend it did not exist. Warning players against purchasing the game, he stated that G.rev "made a dog's breakfast" of the game in comparison to previous series developers indieszero. Describing the minigames as "superficially similar", he nevertheless believed that "the humor, the attention to detail, the passion of the two previous games" was entirely absent, calling them "by-the-numbers" as opposed to "charming parodies". Going on to pan both the level design and controls, he said that the game would only make players nostalgic for the N-Gage. Saying that the game got worse as he kept playing, he characterized the overworld as an "ugly town" that did not let players use buttons to navigate. He recommended that players "jump through whatever hoops [they] have to" to play the fan translation of Retro Game Challenge 2, describing it as "fantastic", and avoid importing GameCenter CX 3.
