= Akina Minami =

Japanese gravure model (born 1989)

- 南 明奈
- Born: 15 May 1989 (age 37); Tsurumi-ku, Yokohama, Kanagawa Prefecture, Japan
- Other name: Akkiina (アッキーナ)
- Occupations: Gravure model; tarento
- Agent: Free Style Company
- Spouse: Masaru Hamaguchi (m. 2018)
- Children: 1
- Modeling information
- Height: 160 cm (5 ft 3 in)
- Hair color: Black
- Eye color: Brown
- Website: fs-company.jp/akkina/

Akina Minami (南 明奈, Minami Akina; born 15 May 1989 in Yokohama, Kanagawa Prefecture) is a Japanese gravure model and tarento signed to Free Style Company. Minami's recognition as a model has also spread beyond Japan and she was named as one of the "7 most irresistibly cute Japanese idols" by the Thailand version of FHM magazine in 2010.

== Personal life ==
In 2013, Minami began dating the comedian from the comedy duo Yoiko, Masaru Hamaguchi, who is seventeen years her senior. They got married on May 25, 2018, initially giving birth to a stillborn before she gave birth to a healthy baby, their son in 2022.

== Filmography ==
=== Movies ===
- Wanna be Free!: Tokyo Girl (2006) as amateur model
- Chorus-tai: Kanojotachi no Kiseki (2007) as Aki
- Buraburabanban (2008)
- Cho Kamen Rider Den-O & Decade Neo Generations: The Onigashima Warship (2009) as Toki
- Ju-on: Shiroi Rōjo (2009) as Akane

=== TV dramas ===
- Shibatora: Dōgan Keiji Shibata Taketora (2008) as Tamaki Ayukawa
- Maison Ikkoku (26 July 2008) as Kozue Nanao
- Real Clothes (16 September 2008) as Hitomi Hanada
- Magic x Warrior Magi Majo Pures! (1 April 2018) as Hōko Minami

=== TV programmes ===
- Sakiyomi Jan Bang!
- Pretty Rhythm Aurora Dream

=== Video games ===
- Akina Minami appeared in several posters in the Sony PlayStation 3 video game, Metal Gear Solid 4: Guns of the Patriots.
- Akina Minami is a playable avatar in the Japanese Cardass game Dragon Ball Heroes, she is a female Saiyan who is able to learn and use various attacks from other characters.

=== Clothing brand ===
Akina Minami launched a clothing brand named after her. Her clothing brand includes kimono and Western style couture outfits for children.
