= Retro Game Challenge 2 =

2009 video game

- Developer(s): indieszero
- Publisher(s): Namco Bandai Games
- Composer(s): Koji Yamada
- Series: Retro Game Challenge
- Platform(s): Nintendo DS
- Release: JP: February 26, 2009
- Genre(s): Minigame
- Mode(s): Single-player

Retro Game Challenge 2 (Note: Known in Japan as GameCenter CX: Arino no Chōsenjō 2 (Japanese: ゲームセンターCX 有野の挑戦状2, Hepburn: Gēmu Sentā Shī Ekkusu Arino no Chōsenjō 2; lit. Game Center CX: Arino's Challenge 2)) is a 2009 minigame compilation video game developed by indieszero and published by Namco Bandai Games for the Nintendo DS. It is the sequel to Retro Game Challenge. Unlike its predecessor, it never saw an official Western release due to low sales. It received a fan translation to English that was released in 2014. A remaster of the first two games, named GameCenter CX: Arino no Chousenjou 1+2 REPLAY, was announced for Nintendo Switch and set to be released on February 22, 2024. At the time of the announcement, no news of English localization was announced.

Like the original, it is based on the television show GameCenter CX starring Shinya Arino. The game was well received by critics, who called it generally superior to its predecessor and featuring higher-quality minigames.

== Gameplay ==
Fan translated screenshot in which the top screen shows a battle in the diegetic turn-based RPG Guadia Quest Saga, while the bottom screen shows the child main characters playing the game.

Retro Game Challenge 2 largely consists of Famicom-styled games reminiscent of actual games released in the late 1980s through mid-1990s. The game also features games styled after Famicom Disk System, Super Famicom, Game Boy, and Game Boy Color games, as well as variants on games included in Retro Game Challenge and a "game trainer" modeled after a Game & Watch. All together, the title has 15 games in one.

Some of the games include: Wiz-Man, inspired by Pac-Man, Mutekiken Kung Fu, meant to mimic a Western-developed game in the style of Karateka, and Demon Returns, a platformer inspired by both Super Mario Bros. and Ghosts 'n Goblins.

== Plot ==
Rather than being a story sequel to the previous game, the story functions as a total reboot with the same concept - the player is sent back in time to 1984 by Game Master Arino, an evil entity resembling a disembodied head based on Shinya Arino. The Game Master then forces the player, now a child, to complete various "challenges" within the game's numerous sub-games in order to return to their own time. After the player is given a game to play by Arino, they must complete four distinct challenges before moving on to the next.

== Development ==
Despite the stated desire of series composer Koji Yamada for the game to be localized, Xseed Games, the publishers of the first game in the series, told the gaming press that it was "close to impossible to justify" releasing the game in the West, citing the sales numbers of the series' previous entry, as well as licensing issues, as the rights not only belonged to Namco Bandai for the game, but Fuji TV for the show it was based on. Xseed Games Vice President Ken Berry called the localization of the previous game "incredibly expensive" due to "multiple IP owners" and "extensive localization programming", saying that their "love for the game blinded [their] business reasoning", and that it was virtually guaranteed they would lose money publishing the sequel.

Efforts to fan translate the game began moving forward in 2011, after it became clear the game would not come to the West. A translation team was set up called the GameCenter CX 2 Translation Project. It was subsequently released years later, in 2014.

== Reception ==
Retro Game Challenge 2 was the fifth-best-selling game in Japan on the week of its release, selling 44,000 units.

Kurt Kalata of Hardcore Gaming 101 called the game's quality more consistent than its predecessor, with no "outright stinkers", though also saying that there was no game that matched the quality of Haggleman 3. However, he called the text-based Detective Kacho minigames very difficult to navigate without knowing Japanese.

Chris Kohler of Wired called the game one of the most brilliant on the Nintendo DS platform and superior to its predecessor, with more varied types of games, lamenting the fact that it was not localized despite the release in the West of "every crappy shovelware piece of lazy trash from here to eternity".

== Legacy ==
An additional, Japan-only entry in the series, GameCenter CX: 3-Chōme no Arino, was later released for the Nintendo 3DS. However, it was developed by G.rev rather than indieszero like the first two games. Kohler described the sequel as "very bad" in comparison to its predecessor on account of the change in developers, saying that the minigames lacked attention to detail and were simply "by-the-numbers", as well as noting that they were repetitive and boring. He also criticized the replacement of fictional box art with a hub world.
