= Retro Game Challenge =

2007 video game

- Developer: indieszero
- Publishers: JP: Namco Bandai Games; NA: Xseed Games
- Director: Masanobu Suzui
- Producers: Shinya Arino; Masanobu Suzui
- Designers: Katsunori Yazawa; Ryoji Arisaka; Tadayuki Hikida
- Composers: Koji Yamada; Naoto Ouba
- Platform: Nintendo DS
- Release: JP: November 15, 2007; NA: February 10, 2009
- Genre: Minigame
- Mode: Single-player

Retro Game Challenge (Note: Known in Japan as GameCenter CX: Arino no Chōsenjō (Japanese: ゲームセンターCX 有野の挑戦状, Hepburn: Gēmu Sentā Shī Ekkusu Arino no Chōsenjō; lit. Game Center CX: Arino's Challenge)) is a minigame compilation video game developed by indieszero and published by Namco Bandai Games for the Nintendo DS. It is based on the television series GameCenter CX, with host Shinya Arino providing significant input into the game creation process. The game was released on November 15, 2007 in Japan and February 10, 2009 in North America by Xseed Games.

A sequel, Retro Game Challenge 2, was released in Japan on February 26, 2009 and was never officially localized into English by Xseed, but received a fan translation. A third game, GameCenter CX: 3-Chōme no Arino, also saw a Japan-only release on March 20, 2014. A remaster of the first two games, named Game Center CX: Arino no Chousenjou 1+2 REPLAY, was announced for Nintendo Switch. At the time of the announcement, no news of English localization was announced.

== Gameplay ==
In the game, the player controls a boy or girl who plays retro games in order to appease the Demon Arino (based on the TV show's host Shinya Arino). The Demon Arino gives four challenges to complete for each game.

Each game is original but with graphics, sound, and game-play elements which make it look old or retro. Many of them are similar in both gameplay and appearance to real Famicom games. They come with fully illustrated manuals.

Occasionally there will be a fake gaming magazine, Game Fan Magazine, that has articles about the games, rankings (with other fictional games named), and "game advice" from GameCenter CX ADs who have appeared over the seasons of the TV show. In the case of the North American version, the pseudonyms of journalists better known in English-speaking countries were used.

Some parts of the various games are inspired by actual challenges that Arino has faced in his TV episodes. For example, the bonus character in the second half of stage 1 of "Star Prince" is taken from his attempt to get bonus points from playing Star Force in season 1. The various "special" continue tricks (like in Haggle Man) come from the several instances in which Arino must use these features to complete tasks on the show. Even the ending to the game pulls a trick from Takeshi no Chōsenjō from season 1.

== Reception ==
The game received a score of 33/40 from Famitsu.

As of June 2009, Retro Game Challenge had sold fewer than 100,000 copies in North America. This was viewed as disappointing for its North American publisher, Xseed Games, discouraging them from also localizing the sequel. Director of Publishing Ken Berry said that sales were initially strong but died down.

== Sequels ==
GameCenter CX: Arino no Chōsenjō 2 is the sequel to Retro Game Challenge and was released on February 26, 2009, in Japan. Like the original, it largely consists of NES-styled games reminiscent of actual games released in the late 1980s through mid-1990s. This game also features games styled after Super NES, Game Boy, Game Boy Color, and Famicom Disk System games, as well as variants on games included in Retro Game Challenge and a "game trainer" modeled after a Game & Watch. All together, this title has 15 games in one. The game received an English fan translation in 2014. A third game in the series, GameCenter CX: 3-Chōme no Arino, was released exclusively in Japan for the Nintendo 3DS on March 20, 2014, with the series switching developers to G.rev.

=== Reception ===
Game Informer senior editor Phil Kollar gave the game an honorable mention on his personal top 10 list for 2009, noting that "a few editors managed to cram Retro Game Challenge onto their top 10s."
