= Hanamaru-Daikichi Hakata =

Japanese comedy duo

- Hakata Hanamaru-Daikichi (博多華丸・大吉)
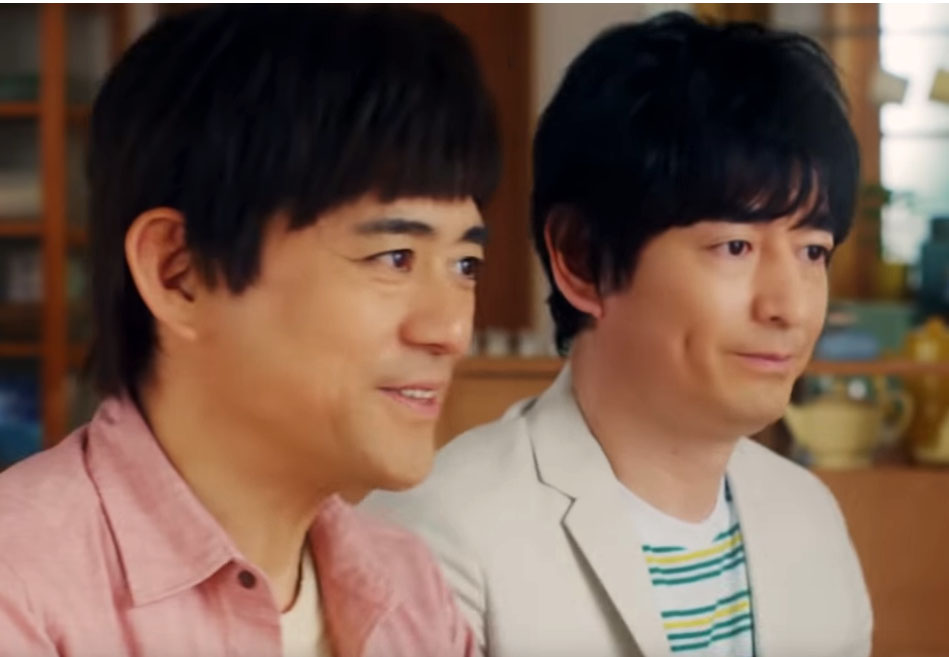
- Hanamaru Hakata (left) and Daikichi Hakata
- Employer: Yoshimoto Kogyo

Comedy career
- Years active: 1991–
- Genres: Manzai; Monomane
- Members: Daikichi Hakata (Tsukkomi); Hanamaru Hakata (Boke)

Notes
- Same year/generation as: Ninety-nine; Yoiko; Daisuke Miyagawa

Hanamaru-Daikichi Hakata (博多華丸・大吉, Hakata Hanamaru-Daikichi) is a Japanese comedy duo (kombi) consisting of Daikichi Hakata (博多大吉) and Hanamaru Hakata (博多華丸) that have featured in a number of television shows. They are employed by Yoshimoto Kogyo, and are mainly active in Tokyo. They graduated from Yoshimoto NSC Fukuoka's 1st generation class.

The duo formed in 1990 and begun activities in 1991 with a focus on manzai. They left for Tokyo in 2005 and rose to prominence with their Hakata dialect in their performances, also winning The Manzai competition in 2014.

== Members ==
- Daikichi Hakata (博多 大吉), real name Hironori Yoshioka (吉岡廣憲) Born April 8, 1971 in Kobe, Hyōgo and raised in Koga, Fukuoka. Plays the tsukkomi. Daikichi writes all of the unit's material.
- Hanamaru Hakata (博多 華丸), real name Mitsuteru Okazaki (岡崎光輝) Born March 10, 1970 in Sawara-ku, Fukuoka. Plays the boke.

== Life and career ==
The two met in the rakugo club at Fukuoka University, as both wanted to pursue comedy, but the only comedy-related club established was the rakugo club. The two of them became friends through their mutual dissatisfaction of the club and its direction. They initially formed a unit known as Yocchan Okachan, but did not find any success.

In 1990, the duo performed manzai on a local television program aired by TV Nishinippon as Okazaki-kun to Yoshioka-kun. They did not qualify to the next round, placing 4th out of the 8 contestant duos. However, this appearance sparked their recruitment to Yoshimoto NSC Fukuoka. The duo once again changed their name to Hanamaru Tsuruya-Daikichi Kameya.

Debuting in 1991, the duo began activities and were regulars on several local variety programs alongside other comedians such as Cunning Takeyama. Takeyama left Fukuoka for Tokyo soon after, stating There is no point in becoming famous in Fukuoka, which left a deep impression in Hanamaru and Daikichi.

In 1993, the duo became the MC for a popular local program, becoming one of the most popular comedy duos in Fukuoka. It wasn't until 1995 that the duo gained recognition nation-wide, when the duo was introduced in the popular program aired by Fuji TV, Meccha Motetai - I wanna be pop!, appearing alongside popular comedians and hosts in Tokyo such as Ninety-nine. During this time, the duo were mainly active in television appearances as presenters and guests, with little opportunity to showcase their manzai.

In 2001, the duo entered M-1 Grand Prix, but finished 11th, just one place short of appearing on the televised grand finals. The duo changed their name to Hanamaru-Daikichi Hakata in 2004, the catalyst being that their previous names were considered unlucky. The duo flourished through these years but remained in Fukuoka until 2005, when they moved to Tokyo to further their careers. The move meant a decrease in the number of TV appearances and regular gigs the unit got, as their main activity became manzai performances at the Lumine theatre owned by Yoshimoto.

In 2005, the group's luck turned around as they flourished in various variety programs such as Tonneruzu no Minasan no Okage deshita and Panel Quiz Attack 25. Additionally, Hanamaru won the R-1 Grand Prix in the same year, bringing major recognition and popularity for the duo.

In 2014, the duo entered The Manzai competition and were winners, further cementing their status and number of television programs.

== Media ==
This list comprises appearances by both members of the duo as Hanamaru-Daikichi Hakata only, for individual appearances, see Hanamaru Hakata and Daikichi Hakata.

=== Current regular programs ===
- Ariyoshi Zemi (有吉ゼミ) -- Nippon TV
- Oshietemorau Mae to Ato (教えてもらう前と後) -- MBS TV/TBS TV
- Hanamaru-Daikichi no Nanshiyouto? (華丸・大吉のなんしようと?) -- TV Nishinippon MC
- Asaichi (あさイチ) -- NHK G Co-hosts
- Sorette!? Jissai Dōnanoka (それって!?実際どうなの課) -- Chukyo TV/Nippon TV (04/03/2019-)
- Yabai ka Sugoi ka Kamihitoe! (ヤバイかスゴイか カミヒトエ!) -- TV Asahi (04/03/2019-)

=== Semi-regular and special programs ===
- Ametalk! (アメトーーク!) -- TV Asahi
- Tamori Club (タモリ俱楽部) -- TV Asahi

=== Television drama ===
- Cooking Papa (クッキングパパ) -- TV Nishinippon (2008)
- Mentai Piriri (めんたいぴりり) -- TV Nishinippon (2013)

- Mentai Piriri 2 (めんたいぴりり2) -- TV Nishinippon (2015)

=== Voice acting ===
- Yo-kai Watch: Enma Daiō to Itsutsu no Monogatari da Nyan! (2015) as Nekokiyo and Inumaro

=== Commercials ===
- Plaza-TV (Pachinko Store in Fukuoka)
- Mitsuya Cider (Asahi Soft Drinks)
- Turmeric Revolution (FANCL)
- Autoway Ltd.
- Create Co., Ltd.
- Sunrefre Holdings

==== Past commercials ====
- Mazda Kyushu
- Space World
- NTT Docomo Tohoku
- 「BEST OF GOING UNDER GROUND with YOU」 - Going Under Ground
- au Kyushu
- House Foods
- H.I.S.
