= Hanamaru Hakata =

Japanese comedian (born 1970)

- 博多 華丸
- Born: Mitsuteru Okazaki; 8 April 1970 (age 56); Sawara-ku, Fukuoka, Fukuoka Prefecture, Japan
- Other names: Hana-chan (華ちゃん); Okazaki-san
- Education: Fukuoka University Institute of Technology (dropped out)
- Occupation: Comedian
- Years active: 1991–
- Agent: Yoshimoto Creative Agency
- Known for: Hanamaru-Daikichi Hakata
- Style: Manzai (boke)
- Height: 173 cm (5 ft 8 in)
- Children: Momoko Okazaki (daughter)
- Awards: 2006: R-1 Grand Prix Victory

Hanamaru Hakata (博多 華丸, Hakata Hanamaru; born Mitsuteru Okazaki (岡崎 光輝, Okazaki Mitsuteru), 8 April 1970, in Sawara-ku, Fukuoka, Fukuoka Prefecture) is a Japanese comedian who performs boke of the double act Hanamaru-Daikichi Hakata, in which his partner is Daikichi Hakata. After working with Fukuoka Yoshimoto, he joined Yoshimoto Creative Agency (Tokyo Yoshimoto) since 2005.

== Biography ==
Hakata was born as the eldest son of a family who runs construction work. He graduated Takamiya Junior High School and Fukuoka University attached Ohoro High School, and recommended entrance to Fukuoka University engineering department (but dropped out later). In addition, Hakata's name of Taka at the Rakugo Study Group where he enrolled is "Fukufukutei Saron". When he consulted with a person familiar with fortune telling by former employee of Fukuoka Yoshimoto, his former name was told to rename it to "Haramaru Hakata", and the name of the combination was renamed to Hanamaru-Daikichi Hakata. Although he was sold so much in Fukuoka, Cunning and Hiroshi selling in Tokyo, moved the base to Tokyo from 2005 and lives in Yokohama City, Kanagawa Prefecture (Note: In 2012 he also served as a police chief of the day.) Hakata's first entry in the preliminary round of R-1 Grand Prix held from December the same year, he advanced to the final. At the finals, he performed the "monster style" of Kiyoshi Kodama and won R-1 Grand Prix 2006. Hanamaru Hakata sometimes studied in Yoshimoto Shin Kongi although it was a short period in 2000.

== Personal life ==
His main nickname is Hanamaru. Some fans and entertainers called him Okazaki-san (岡崎さん) from his real name. Hakata started calling Okazaki-san Ameagari Kesshitai, Toru Hanahara of the death squadron, Hanamaru himself is grateful, that is also pleased from his family. At Ame Talk, he has appeared to food and drink performers such as "Onega Artist" and "Potato Salad Entertainer", "Frying Entertainer" every time, and it is sticking to food as "Only there is the only one winning Okichi-sensei" strongly, he mentioned his own wedding ceremony at the restaurant in Fukuoka city.

Hakata is a fan of Fukuoka SoftBank Hawks and Avispa Fukuoka. From the time he was active in Fukuoka with the Hawks' players, both public and private exchanges were deep, and when Hawks won the 2011 series in Japan, they participated in a beer sponsoring a celebration party. Hakata catches balls and throws on his left. In the past, he was a fan of Hiroshima Toyo Carp until Hawks became the director of Fukuoka Yoshimoto of the time even after Hawks came to Fukuoka until it was turned into Hawks fans semi-compulsively. In his high school days, Hakata have subscribed to "Monthly Carp Fan", about Tomonori Maeda who made his professional baseball debut the same year as his entertainment debut, even now in 2013 "I can not say it with a loud voice but I like the most A good player is Maeda."

He profess as saying that the youth was "Nagabuchi was one piece" and is also a fan of Tsuyoshi Nagabuchi, and has been traveling to Nagabuchi's new music announcement convention, etc. even after Tokyo, in the Ame-talk and "Tsuyoshi Nagabuchi" performances and talk about episodes with the singer, and in August 2015, "Tsuyoshi Nagabuchi 100,000 All Night - Live 2015 In Fuji Mountain Foot" with Parachute Butai, Goriken and others to see the concert.

== Family life ==
With Hakata, he was acquainted with a friend who came as a customer when working part-time in an izakaya in Nakasu, and later married in 1998. They have two daughters. Momoko Okazaki, their second daughter, was a member of the female idol group Sakura Gakuin and joined Babymetal in April 2023. Also, Hakata once appeared on Ame-talk "Daughter Deredele Entertainer", appealing his daughter liked (broadcast on 15 March 2012).

== Impressions ==
- Batten Arakawa
  Hachimaru's Eighteen. When doing this imitation, "Ban Muromigawa" may also be mentioned. Although it is almost unknown except in Kyushu, it is said that Hakata is a so-called "regional limited neta", while in Fukuoka, local people who are imitating this have been infiltrated from Kiyama Ki and are considered as representative of him.
- Kiyoshi Kodama
  Many stories from Panel Quiz Attack 25. Sometimes lines such as "Attack Chance" and "Sono Tōri" are entered. There is also a story called "Kiyoshi Kodama no aiueo Sakubun" (contents are Panel Quiz Attack 25).
- Jay Kabira
  Mimicry of narration that is apt to be in Sharam Q audition of Asayan (TV Tokyo). Hakata would be a Hawks player unexpectedly while announcing the starting members of Japan national football team. (Note: In 2012, he use the introduction "Honda (Keisuke Honda thought it is actually Yuichi Honda), Akashi, Kokubo, Matsunaka, Peña!" In the past, there was also a pattern called "Takara! Nakada! Matsunaka!")He also manage Jon Kabira, the elderbrother of Jay.
- Jon Kabira
- Junichi Teshima (weather forecaster)
  Teshima himself has appeared almost outside of the broadcasting area of Television Nishinippon Corporation, and it has become almost one of "local limited contents" as well.
- Fukuoka SoftBank Hawks director Sadaharu Oh
  Corner in the Fuji Television series Tonneruzu no Minasan no Okage deshita "Komaka sugite Tsutawaranai Monomane Senshuken 8".
- President Yoshinori Kita of Tokado (same as above)
- Yoshiro Yokomine (same as above)
- Monta Mino
  TV Tokyo Buchinuki showcased in 2005 at Thursday Gokuraku Tombo's "Oni no Tsubo Gassen".
- Phil Jackson
  NBA's name coach. He showed off only once on Tetsuwan momochi. There was no impersonation of talking only with appearance and reaction.
- Sho Tobari
  Tonneruzu no Minasan no Okage deshita "Komaka sugite Tsutawaranai Monomane Senshuken 13".
- Sanshōtei Yumenosuke
  Tonneruzu no Minasan no Okage deshita at "Komaka sugite Tsutawaranai Monomane Senshuken 19" and Sanshōtei hosted the chair for many years, and show off the monster of the state of the host of the "Washoi Million Summer Festival" in Kitakyushu City.
- Hiroshi Minohara

== Relationship with Kiyoshi Kodama ==
During the activity in Fukuoka Hakata's Kiyoshi Kodama impression was shown off. In November 2005 he participated in the corner Tonneruzu no Minasan no Okage deshita in the "Komaka sugite Tsutawaranai Monomane Senshuken 6". I won the prize in Kodama's impression. Even at "Zenkoku Taikai" broadcast on 29 December, Hakata won again with his impression and got a prize of 1 million yen. In 2006, he won the R-1 Grand Prix and won Kodama's impression (aiueo composition "a line" to "ta line"), won the trophy and the prize money 5 million yen.

Hakata initially co-started with Kodama at the Attack 25 Entertainer Competition broadcast on 3 September 2006.

As an impersonator of Kodama, he appeared in the Japan Professional Football League (JnLeague) first section held on 25 August 2007 Kawasaki Frontale vs. Gamba Osaka won the attraction promotion campaign "Attack! 25th" by Kawasaki. Also in Fukuoka City there is the J. League Club Avispa Fukuoka and its support is also Hanamaru hesitated to request from Kawasaki, but this year Fukuoka is in the second division and he will not play against Kawasaki directly, so decide the appearance he explained on his blog.

As a respect for Kodama, he uses the right hand when declaring "Attack Chance", but Hanamaru uses his left hand. On 16 May 2011, when Kodama died of stomach cancer, he said that he was derived from being a counterfeit and was also a sign of respect for Kodama himself. Only when appeared in "Attack 25" mentioned above, Kodama's own proposal realized declaration with both hands with Kodama and Hanamaru. On the funeral of Kodama, which ran on 21 May, he attended with Daikichi.

Regarding impersonation after Kodama's death, "I received from Kodama" Hakata thought it would not be long beforehand. "I received that it was meant to mean trying something new rather than being angry." as thought that the seal was also considered.

== Filmography ==
=== TV programmes ===
==== Current appearances ====
Regular

Run	Title	Network	Notes
2 Oct 2014 –	Go Go! Smile	CBC	Thursday regular
Apr 2015 –	Morning Chance	TBS	Wednesday commentator
Oct 2016 –	Hanamaru Hakata no Morai Sake Minato Tabi 2	TX	
Dec 2016 –	40 Otoko haraitsū	TX	
Jan 2017 –	Misuzu Presents Hanamaru Hakata×Hawks Netsu Otoko!! Golf to Honne Sake	Fox Sports & Entertainment	

Quasi-regular/irregular appearances

Title	Network
Tonneruzu no Minasan no Okage deshita "Hakase to Joshu –Komaka sugite Tsutawaranai Monomane Senshuken–"	CX

Former appearances

Run	Title	Network	Notes
	Morning Mint	TNC	
	Gatchi gachi	TNC	
	Geinōjin Kakuzuke Check! Korezo Shin no Ichiryū-hinda! 2013 Oshōgatsu Special	ABC	
	Ketchaku!! Dotchi Mania Shinshun Special	EX	
	Korekara wa Pacific League da!	Tokyo MX	Fukuoka SoftBank Hawks fan representative
	Yamanotesen Isshū: War King Gourmet	BS Asahi	
Oct 2015 – Sep 2016	Hanamaru Hakata no Morai Sake Minato Tabi	TX	
Apr 2012 – 30 Sep 2016	Non Stop!	CX	Tuesday regular

=== Radio ===
Current appearances

Title	Network	Notes
Hanamaru Hakata no Kuroi-sa de tsunagaru Bye!	RKB Radio	
Tamao Akae: Tama musubi	TBS Radio	Corner regular "Omoshiroi Otona" (on the 5th Wednesday in charge)

Former appearances

Run	Title	Network	Notes
	Shake Hip Groovin'	Cross FM	
	Booby Trap: Toriaezu Nama!	FM Fukuoka	
	Hanamaru Emi Gekijō	FM Fukuoka	
	Tokyo Remix Zoku	J-Wave	
	Hanamaru-Daikichi Hakata no Alice ta zu Saizensen!	Radio Osaka	
20 Sep 2014 – 24 Mar 2015	The Top 5 (Season 4)	TBS Radio	Tuesday commentator

=== TV dramas ===
Run	Title	Role	Network	Notes	Ref.
2007	Judge: Shima no Saibankan Funtō-ki		NHK		
2013	Mentai piriri	Toshiyuki Umino	TNC	Lead role	
2015	Mentai piriri 2	Toshiyuki Umino	TNC	Lead role	
2016	Gachi Hoshi	Ramen shop owner	TNC		
2016	Sanada Maru	Saizō	NHK	Taiga drama; cameo appearance in the final episode.	
2016–17	Kamen Rider Ex-Aid	Haima Kagami	TV Asahi		
2021	Reach Beyond the Blue Sky	Saigō Takamori	NHK	Taiga drama	

=== Internet dramas ===
Year	Title	Role
2015	Dame Ta Jūyūshi	Saizō

=== Films ===
Year	Title	Role	Notes	Ref.
2006	Akihabara@Deep	Cat fight audience member		
2007	Shi ni zokonai no Ao	Hideyuki Sasaki		
2016	Kamen Rider Heisei Generations: Dr. Pac-Man vs. Ex-Aid & Ghost with Legend Riders	Haima Kagami		
2019	Mentai Piriri	Toshiyuki Umino	Lead role	
2021	Masquerade Night	Mikio Urabe		
2023	Mentai Piriri: Flower of Pansy	Toshiyuki Umino	Lead role	

=== Japanese dub ===
Year	Title	Role	Voice dub for	Notes	Ref.
2013	Jack the Giant Slayer	Foe	Angus Barnett		

=== Animated films ===
Date	Title	Role
2006	Over the Hedge	Policeman
19 Dec 2015	Yo-kai Watch: Enma Daiō to Itsutsu no Monogatari da Nyan!	Nekokiyo

=== Advertisements ===
Year	Product	Notes	Ref.
	Bar Pass	Onsen centre in Kokurakita-ku, Kitakyūshū	
	Okuchi Shuzo "Kuroisa Nishiki"	Tighten with the phrase "I like to wear it!"	
	Wants		
2016	Nissin Cisco "Gorotto Granola"	Internet only	

=== CD ===
Date	Title	Label	Notes
21 Apr 1995	So.Ta.I	Epic/Sony Records	A local version derived from "Da.Yo.Ne" (East End X Yuri) hit in 1994. Release as South End X Yuka from Fukuoka name. Participated in the unit in the "Tsuruya Hanamaru" era before renaming it to Hanamaru Hakata. The other members are now · Pu & Mu no octopus, "Yuka" Yuka Itaya

=== Stage ===
Run	Title	Location
6–29 Mar 2015	Mentai piriri	Hakata-za
4–26 Mar 2017	Nekketsu! Buraban shōjo.	Hakata-za

== Bibliography ==
Date	Title	Publisher	Code	Notes
20 Apr 2012	Tabezu ni Iwaren Bai! in Fukuoka: Gohan: Mayou: Geinin, Hanamaru Hakata no Dai Ketsudan!	Yoshimoto Books	ISBN 978-4-84-709068-4	
8 Aug 2012	Bye Bye neko Bye	Eye Freak		Delivery within the picture book Kohon
