= Ninety-nine (comedy duo) =

Japanese comedy duo

- Naintinain (ナインティナイン)
- Other name: Nainai (ナイナイ)
- Employer: Yoshimoto Kogyo

Comedy career
- Years active: 1990– (formed in Osaka)
- Members: Hiroyuki Yabe (Tsukkomi); Takashi Okamura (Boke)

Notes
- Same year/generation as: Hanamaru-Daikichi Hakata; TKO; Yoiko; Daisuke Miyagawa; Taizo Harada, Ken Horiuchi (Neptune); Yuki Himura (Bananaman)

Ninety-nine (ナインティナイン, Naintinain), or Nainai (ナイナイ) is a Japanese comic duo from Osaka working for the entertainment conglomerate Yoshimoto Kogyo. The duo (kombi), consisting of Takashi Okamura as boke (stooge) and Hiroyuki Yabe as tsukkomi (straightman), formed in 1990.

The pair met in high school, where they were both involved in the soccer club. Okamura had been receiving guidance from Yabe's brother Yoshiyuki Yabe and throughout their high school life they had a senpai and kōhai relationship. As he was Yoshiyuki's younger brother, his soccer club peers referred to him as "Yabe Juni[or]". Upon graduating from high school, Okamura entered Ritsumeikan University and studied there for one year. Yabe, who was significantly less able academically, was unable to get into any universities and as a result invited Okamura to join Yoshimoto with him as a duo. The pair have stated that one of the reasons that drove them to this decision was their combined admiration for Yabe's brother Yoshiyuki, who had entered Yoshimoto two years before and formed the comedic duo "Channels". However, Yoshiyuki was allegedly opposed to the idea at that time, advising the pair on the harsh realities of a life as an entertainer.

Their act is typical of manzai comedy duos, though they are also known for TV segments filmed in locales such as Hong Kong and Italy. Yabe has tended to receive criticism from Japanese fans because his participation in their skits is small and out of proportion compared to the always active and effervescent Okamura, even as a straightman.

Okamura and Yabe also famously took the roles of Mario and Luigi (respectively) in the Japanese Hot Mario Bros. advertisement campaign.

They have hosted Mecha-Mecha Iketeru!, a Japanese comedy show, and they have also hosted a number of television programs in the past. They also hosted a weekly radio program for All Night Nippon on Fridays as a duo, but since 2015 Okamura hosts this program alone.

== Takashi Okamura ==
Takashi Okamura (岡村 隆史, Okamura Takashi; born July 3, 1970 in Osaka, Japan) is a Japanese comedian and one half of the owarai duo Ninety-nine, (Note: also known as Nai Nai in Japan) playing the "comic stooge" or boke of the group. His nicknames range from "OkatakaLeader" to "Okachan".

Okamura has consistently been a large-audience draw on Japanese TV for his wild antics, such as breakdancing while wearing only the cowl of anime/professional wrestling hero Tiger Mask. At 156 centimetres (5 ft 1 in) (the tallest person in his family) he is a striking contrast to the lankier Yabe.

They formed Ninety-nine in 1990 (when Okamura dropped out of Ritsumeikan University) and in 1993 won a New Talent Prize. Okamura cried with joy when interviewed after receiving it. The following year, Ninety-nine hosted their first on-air show Ninety-Nine All Night Nippon, which is still aired today. Their success continued to grow with programs such as Mecha-Mecha Iketeru! and Asayan.

Okamura has appeared in the Japanese stage adaptation of The Lion King. He has displayed his dancing prowess by becoming an honorary member of Johnny's Jr., performing with SMAP and Exile.

Okamura made controversial remarks in April 2020, suggesting during a radio program that men could look forward to seeing pretty girls enter the fūzoku industry (sex industry) after the coronavirus pandemic was over. Okamura since apologized for his comments, saying in a statement that the remarks were "extremely inappropriate toward people who are in a tough position."

== Hiroyuki Yabe ==
Hiroyuki Yabe (矢部 浩之, Yabe Hiroyuki; born October 23, 1971 in Suita, Osaka) is a Japanese comedian. He is one of the popular duo (kombi) Ninety-nine with Takashi Okamura. Yabe is considered the straight man in the duo. Yabe also plays Luigi in the Japanese Hot Mario Bros advert campaign.

Born in Osaka, Yabe played soccer in his youth. As a sportscaster on the TV Asahi program Yabecchi FC, he interviewed soccer players Ronaldinho and Alessandro Del Piero.
