= Masaru Hamaguchi =

Japanese comedian and actor (born 1972)

- 濱口優
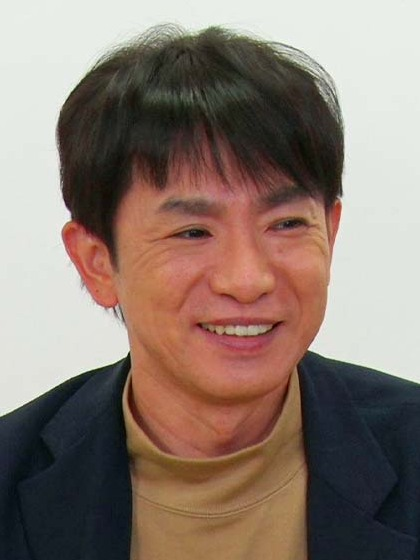
- Born: January 29, 1972 (age 54); Konohana, Osaka, Osaka, Japan
- Employer: Shochiku Geino
- Notable work: Yoiko
- Spouse: Akina Minami (m. 2018)
- Children: 1
- Relatives: Shuji Hamaguchi; Yoshiyuki Hamaguchi

Comedy career
- Years active: 1990–present
- Medium: Television
- Genre: Owarai
- Website: www.shochikugeino.co.jp

Masaru Hamaguchi (Japanese: 濱口 優, Hepburn: Hamaguchi Masaru; born January 29, 1972) is a Japanese comedian and actor from Konohana-ku, Osaka. He is the tsukkomi of the manzai duo, Yoiko, with his partner Shinya Arino.

== Career ==
Hamaguchi and Arino were classmates that graduated high school and formed a manzai duo in 1990. The duo would make their first major televised appearance on Mecha-Mecha Iketeru! in 1996.

== Appearances ==
- Mecha-Mecha Iketeru! (1996–2018)
- Ikinaru! Ougon Densetsu.

== Personal life ==
Hamaguchi was born into a family that owns a coffee shop called "Hamayū" (はまゆう) in Konohana-ku, Osaka, named after the poisonous spider lily from his grandfather's love of lily flowers on the beach.

In 2013, Hamaguchi began dating the gravure model Akina Minami, with whom he has a seventeen-year age difference. They got married on May 25, 2018, initially giving birth to a stillborn before his wife gave birth to a healthy baby, their son in 2022.
