= Yasuko Mitsuura =

Japanese tarento and comedian (born 1971)

- 光浦 靖子
- Born: 20 May 1971 (age 54); Tahara, Aichi, Japan
- Education: Tokyo University of Foreign Studies Foreign Languages Indonesian Department; Waseda University
- Occupation: Comedian
- Years active: 1992–present
- Agent: Production Jinrikisha
- Style: Conte
- Television: Wakaru Kokugo: Yomikaki no Tsubo; Tobu kusuri; Mecha-Mecha Motetai'!; Shūkan Stamina Tengoku
- Height: 1.6 m (5 ft 3 in)
- Partner: Kayoko Okubo
- Website: Oasiz official profile

Yasuko Mitsuura (光浦 靖子, Mitsuura Yasuko; born 20 May 1971) is a Japanese tarento and comedian. She was born in Tahara, Aichi, and is part of the comedy duo Oasiz, with Kayoko Okubo.

== Filmography ==
=== Current appearances ===
Year	Title	Network	Notes	Ref.
	Mecha-Mecha Iketeru!	Fuji TV		
	Mecha-Mecha Yuru 'n deru'!	Zero TV		
	Akko ni omakase!	TBS		
	London Hearts	TV Asahi	"Kakuzuke shi Au Onna-tachi" member	
	Makoto Otake: Golden Radio!	NCB	Thursday partner	
	NHK Kōkōkoza	NHK-E		
2014	Shinobe Sakagami no Seichō Man!!	TV Asahi	Irregular appearances	
2015	Morning Charge!	TV Tokyo	Tuesday commentator	
2015	Shumi no Engei Beginners	NHK-E	Navigator	
	Norinoride Ikou ze!	AFM	Personality	

=== Former appearances ===
Year	Title	Network	Notes	Ref.
	Geppachi! UN Hour arigato yan shita!?	Fuji TV		
	Tobu kusuri	Fuji TV		
	Mecha-Mecha Motetai'!	Fuji TV		
	Tonosama no Pheromone	Fuji TV		
	Shūkan Stamina Tengoku	Fuji TV		
	Hanakin Data H	TV Asahi		
	GAHAHA King	TV Asahi		
	Yōki ni Cappucino	TV Asahi		
	Hiru agari! Domannaka	KTV		
	Sutekina Deai: Ī Asa 8-ji	TBS		
	Pierre Yasuko: Kikaku de wakaru Nō Type	TV Osaka		
	Eigo de Shabera Night	NHK	Nagoya Special Edition	
	Ai no Apron	TV Asahi		
	Shiru o Tanoshimu: Kyō Kashi o Asobu	NHK		
	Hikaru Ijūin: Nichiyōbi no Himitsu Kichi	TBS Radio		
	Uraneta Geinō Wide: Shūkan Emyi Show	YTV		
	Futtonda	CTV		
	Kazemakase: Shin Shokoku Manyū-ki	Fuji TV		
	Kato-chan Machami no Odaiba Cha Cha!!	Fuji TV		
	Art Entertainment: Meikyū Bijutsukan	NHK		
	Ai no Gekijō: Otome wa Tomerarenai	NHK		
	Gokujō Jikara	TV Tokyo		
2010	Shūkan kodomo News	NHK	As the 7th mother	
2010	Gamers TV: Yoasobi Sanshimai –Konya Mo-jō Jōge-ka Sayū Sayū Ba–	NTV		
	Sōgō Shinryō-i Doctor G	NHK		
2012	Somewhere Street	NHK BS Premium	Narrator	
	Wakaru Kokugo: Yomikaki no Tsubo	NHK-E		
	Midnight Rambler	JFN		
	Kirei	TV Asahi		
2013	Suteki ni Handmade	NHK-E	Lecturer	

=== TV dramas ===
Year	Title	Role	Network	Notes
1998	Ten Urara	Kaori Okada (Yamada)	NHK	
2000	Bengoshi Ayuko Takabayashi 27		NTV	
2002	Shiritsu Tantei Mike Hama	Luxury call girl	NTV	Episode 9
2004	Nurse Man ga yuku	Sachiko Akiba	NTV	
2005	Warau Sanninshimai	Suzume Matsuoka	NHK	
2006	Shin Kyoto Meikyūannai 3	Fuyuko Hironaka	TV Asahi	Series 8 Episode 3; Guest
2006	Junjō kirari	Shimako Misaki	NHK	
2008	Akiko Wada Monogatari	Midori Konno	Fuji TV	
2010	Unubore Keiji	Tomoyo Fujisawa	TBS	Episode 10
2011	Jūichinin mo iru!	Megumi Sanada	TV Asahi	
2012	Resident – 5-nin no Kenshui	Keiko Sakoda	TBS	
2013	Galileo Dai 2 Series	Noriko Tazawa	Fuji TV	Final Episode
2013	Jikken Keiji Totori 2	Gogatsu Kisaragi	NHK	Episode 5
2016	Ōoku	Kōdai-in	Fuji TV	
2016	Naomi to Kanako		Fuji TV	Episode 3
2017	Naotora: The Lady Warlord	Ayame	NHK	Taiga drama

=== Films ===
Year	Title	Role	Notes
1996	Super Scandal	Kaneko Nakamura	
1997	Cute	Saiko	
1997	The Human Chair	Tamie	
2000	Shūkan Babylon	Uchiyama	
2000	Pinch Runner	Machida-sensei	
2007	Shrek the Third		Voice
2010	Kurosawa Eiga	Herself	
2011	Kurosawa Eiga 2011: Warai ni dekinai Koi mo aru	Herself	
2014	Clover	Sakurako Kisaragi	

=== Advertisements ===
Year	Title	Co-stars
2006	Suntory Vitamin Water "Neoki Dokkiri"	Mokomichi Hayami
2007	Round One Entertainment	Yakkun Sakurazuka, Aya Sugimoto, Noriko Aota
2009	Ciba Vision Air Optix	Cunning Takeyama, Rie Kuwabata
2009	Mister Donut Mister Yamucha	
2010	Japan Racing Association Club Keiba Keiri no Mitsuura-san	Kōichi Satō
2010	Suntory Nichirei Acerola Drink	Riisa Naka

=== Stage ===
Year	Title
1997	Hiroshima ni Genbaku o Otosu hi

== Bibliography ==
Title
Mi-tsu-u-ra – Haji o kaite mo Hekonde tamaru ka!
Suppada ka de Hansei Bun.
Mitsuura no Naranai Denwa
Busaikuna Yūjō
Kizu name Club
Sekai de Ichiban Otomena Ikimono
Danshi ga moratte Komaru Brooch-shū
Kodomo ga moratte, sō demonai Brooch-shū
Omae yori Watashi no hō ga Sensaida zo!

=== Serials ===
Title
TV Bros. "Kizu name Club: Myaku Ari –Myaku Nashi–"
Naka 1 Challenge Style "Meganede ī mon ne!"
mini "Yasuko Mitsuura no Hataraku! Onna Geinin"
City Living Tokyo Ban "Office Life Shinan"
