= Jūichinin mo Iru! =

- Genre: Drama
- Written by: Kankurō Kudō
- Directed by: Osamu Katayama
- Starring: Ryunosuke Kamiki; Seiichi Tanabe; Yasuko Mitsuura; Kasumi Arimura; Miki Kanai; Takuma Hiraoka; Seishiro Kato; Gen Hoshino; Ryōko Hirosue
- Opening theme: "Bicycle" by Nico Touches the Walls
- Country of origin: Japan
- Original language: Japanese
- No. of seasons: 1
- No. of episodes: 9

Production
- Running time: 60 minutes

Original release
- Network: TV Asahi
- Release: 21 October – 16 December 2011

Jūichinin mo iru! (11人もいる!) is a Japanese television drama series that premiered on TV Asahi on 21 October 2011. Ryunosuke Kamiki plays the lead role, and Ryōko Hirosue plays the role of a family ghost. It received a peak viewership rating of 11.4%, and 8.7% overall average.

== Cast ==
- Ryunosuke Kamiki as Kazuo Sanada (Childhood: Yoshiaki Miyagi; Infant: Shoichiro Tonooka)
- Seiichi Tanabe as Minoru Sanada
- Yasuko Mitsuura as Megumi Sanada
- Kasumi Arimura as Niko Sanada
- Miki Kanai as Mitsuko Sanada
- Takuma Hiraoka as Shirō Sanada
- Seishiro Kato as Saigo Sanada
- Gen Hoshino as Hiroyuki Sanada
- Ryōko Hirosue as Megumi Sanada

Preceded by Jiu Keishichō Tokushu Hanzai Sōsa Gakari (29 July 2011 – 23 September 2011)	TV Asahi Friday Night Dramas; Fridays 23:15 – 24:15 (JST)	Succeeded by 13-sai no Hellowork (13 January 2012 – 9 March 2012)
