= GameCenter CX =

Japanese gaming-variety television show

- Cover for the 11th DVD Boxset, depicting a Famicom, controller and cartridge. The use of the Famicom on the cover was approved by Nintendo.
- Genre: Retro gaming Comedy; Variety show
- Starring: Shinya Arino
- Narrated by: Tsuyoshi Kan; Ayako Yamanaka
- Country of origin: Japan
- Original language: Japanese
- No. of episodes: 395

Production
- Producers: Nozomi Ishida; Seita Kadozawa; Tsuyoshi Kan
- Running time: 60 minutes
- Production companies: Fuji Television; Gascoin Company

Original release
- Network: Fuji TV One
- Release: November 4, 2003 – present

GameCenter CX 20th Channel

YouTube information
- Channel: 【公式】ゲームセンターCX 20th チャンネル
- Years active: 2022–present
- Genres: Gaming, Variety
- Subscribers: 636,000
- Views: 45.9 million
- Last updated: February 27, 2025

GameCenter CX (ゲームセンターCX), also known as Retro Game Master in other regions, is a Japanese gaming-variety show television program produced by Fuji Television and Gascoin Company. The name is a combination of "game center" (the Japanese term for an arcade) and Fuji TV's call sign, JOCX-TV. It stars Shinya Arino, a member of comedy duo Yoiko, who plays home console video games from previous decades and usually attempts to get the game's ending within a single day. The show has been on-air since November 4, 2003, with a new episode airing bi-weekly at Thursday midnight on Fuji TV One. As of 2023, 20 DVD sets have been released in Japan. In 2008, Fuji TV was looking for international distributors for subtitled DVDs.

== Premise ==
The show is presented as a gaming variety show which follows a commentary-based long-play format. Shinya Arino challenges several games from previous eras, presented by his producers to get each ending. He is supported by the show's assistant directors (referred to as ADs) and sometimes other staff, both via moral support and actual gameplay. He also is featured in segments interspersed throughout the episodes where he goes to local arcade centers, as well as segments where he does a variety of things, such as interviews with game designers, showcasing classic console hardware or games, or a made-up game show where the staff participates.

=== GameCenter CX as a company ===
Arino is presented as an employee of the fictitious GameCenter CX company. His jumpsuit attire is adorned with the GameCenter CX logo, which with the second season onward lost the original brackets around the "CX". Arino formally greets anyone of status by serving him/her a business card. The CX company even promotes Arino depending on how well he does during the season. The phrase Arino says right before turning on the console, "Kachō on!", signifies his role as chief of the aforementioned company.

Season	Position	Explanation
Season 1	Senior Staff (Shunin)	
Season 2	Acting Chief (Kachō Dairi)	
Season 3	Chief (Kachō)	After clearing every game in the 3rd Season
Season 4	Acting Chief (Kachō Dairi)	4 losses in a row - Ultraman to ActRaiser
Season 4	Senior Staff (Shunin)	Demoted due to a second final boss failure in ActRaiser
Season 4	Chief (Kachō)	Promoted due to successful completion of Quiz Tonosama no Yabō
Season 18	President (Shachō)	Only on GameCenter MSX, set in a fictional timeline

To continue with the corporate theme of the show, a stock certificate was included with the second DVD collection to have the buyers feel like they owned stock in the company. In the last episode of season 7, Bandai Namco Entertainment president Ishikawa made Arino an honorary employee and presented him with a company card.

In addition, the company is set in a fictional universe featuring characters in the style of Dragon Quest, which also features several characters as a form of commentators: The King and the members of his family, Queen and Prince. Both Queen and Prince appeared earlier as main commentators in earlier seasons, but later ended up as DVD-only characters by replacing the King. This universe also features villains, such as Skull King, Black Satan, Onitengu and Tuxedo Clowns. An elder scientist called Hakase also exists, but he was only featured as a commentator of THE Game Maker DVDs.

== ADs ==
The assistant directors help provide creative input, construct settings, and work as a camera crew at times, especially when on location. Their on-screen presence is typically precipitated by Arino struggling with a spot in a game. They will offer help of varying degrees, enough to dislodge Arino from his despair, but not so much as to raise questions about whether he beat the game on his own. These members of staff start as interns, and often they are promoted to various paid positions surrounding the show's production. Many have moved on to other Japanese TV shows. After they left the staff, sometimes they reappeared in the next seasons or special DVD challenges.

- Naoki Yamada (山田直喜) - Season 1 (first episode only)
- Shinichirou Toujima (東島真一郎) - Seasons 1 & 2
- Hiroshi Sasano (笹野大司) - Season 2
- Shun Urakawa (浦川瞬) - Seasons 3 & 4
- Yuuya Inoue (井上侑也), a.k.a. Inoko MAX (イノコMAX) - Seasons 5 & 6, was part of the main staff since the end of season 13 through 22 as a director
- Sachi Takahashi (高橋佐知), a.k.a. Meijin, Sensei (名人,先生) - Season 7
- Takeshi Tsuruoka (鶴岡丈志) - Season 8
- Tomoaki Nakayama (中山智明) - Seasons 9 & 10
- Hiroyuki Emoto (江本紘之), a.k.a. Emoyan (エモヤン) - Seasons 11 & 12
- Akane Itou (伊藤茜) - Seasons 11 & 12 & 13
- Yuuki Katayama (片山雄貴), a.k.a. Katakin-kun (片きんくん) - Seasons 13 through 15, currently work as a director since season 18
- Junpei Takahashi (高橋純平) - Seasons 13 through 15, currently work as a director since season 18
- Atsushi Itou (伊東篤志) - Season 16
- Gen Matsui (松井現) - Seasons 16 through 18, currently work as a director since season 22
- Hideaki Yanai (矢内英明) - Seasons 18 & 19
- Ryo Osuka (大須賀良) - Seasons 19 & 20
- Hirotaka Watari (渡大空) - Seasons 20 & 21
- Yuta Kaga (加賀祐太) - Seasons 21 & 22
- Tasuku Iwahashi (岩橋資) - Seasons 22 & 23
- Kobayashi Kyosuke (小林恭介) - Season 23 & 24, currently working as a director on the Tamage segment
- Motonao Inotani (猪谷元直) - Seasons 25 through 28
- Naoki Yaegashi (八重樫直希) - Seasons 27 & 28
- Go Aoki (青木剛), a.k.a. Hakase (博士) - Seasons 28 & 29, currently working as Chief AD
- Hayato Kisara (木皿隼斗), a.k.a. Sarapi (さらぴ) - Seasons 29 & 30
- Shinnosuke Morioka (森岡慎之助) - Season 30 (current)

== Miscellaneous staff ==
- Kouichi Abe (阿部浩一) - Cameraman
- Masayuki Kibe (岐部昌幸) - Art Director, Writer
- Tsuyoshi Kan (菅剛史) - Producer, Narrator
- Yuuichirou Suda (須田祐一郎) - Video Editor, left the staff in the 18th season.
- Muneaki Tanizawa (谷澤宗明), a.k.a. Tanii (タニー) - Voice Mixing
- Kensaku Sakai (酒井健作) - Planner
- Yuko Watanabe (渡邊優子) - Assistant Director, left the staff in the 12th season. Came back as director in 17th season.
- Yoshitaka Fukawa (府川由教) - Audio Editor
- Tsukasa Nagahashi (長橋司) - Assistant Director
- Tatsuya Fujimoto (藤本達也) - Production
- Fukutomi Mikan (福富ミカン) - Assistant Director
- Kusuda Kenta (楠田健太) - Director
- Tomoyuki Ogawa (小川友希) - Promotion (PR)
- Shunpei Teramoto (寺本春平) - Assistant Director

== Music ==
- Audio clips from the videogame Kid Icarus (光神話 パルテナの鏡) are often used to intro segments with The King.
- The song used during Arino's arcade field trip adventures is called 異国のしらべ from HEAT WAVE.
- The song during his trip north is "Between the expansive sky and large land" by Chiharu Matsuyama.
- The second and third seasons made extensive use of the soundtracks from the games Headhunter and Headhunter Redemption to highlight the show's dramatic segments.
- Musical segues from the anime Azumanga Daioh are regularly used during field segments, in which Arino visits various game centers and convenience stores.
- The show also frequently features popular music by contemporary artists such as Phil Collins, Jesse McCartney and Madonna, as well as music from film scores like Jurassic Park and Disney's The Hunchback of Notre Dame.
- The song used for showing elements from games at Season 9 and onwards is called Hijacked from the library music album called Hollywood Premieres by 615 Trax and Warner Chappell Production Music.

=== Segment Songs ===
- "Game Collections" uses the songs The King Of Pleasure (seasons 1 & 2 only) and Reaching For The Stars (all seasons, bar 10th) by Fantastic Plastic Machine.
- "Arino's Ring-Ring Tactics!" uses both the opening and ending songs from Monkey, Monkey Magic and Gandhara.
- "Urawaza Jet Stream" uses the songs "The Intimacy of My Woman's Beautiful Eyes" by James Carter (for only one episode) and "Romeo Is Bleeding" by Tom Waits for the rest the segments. Episode 25 uses the song "Night Birds" by Shakatak while Arino is reading the postcard.
- "The Aces of Hardware Won't Appear" uses (and is named after) the song "Heart No Ace ga Detekonai" by Candies.
- "The Romance Never Ends" uses (and is named after) the song "Romantic ga Tomaranai" by C-C-B.
- "Game & Watch, I Can't Leave You Alone" uses the song "Hottokenai yo" by Seishiro Kusunose.
- "Famicom Manga Café"'s song is based on Hello Goodbye by Yoshie Kashiwabara.
- "GameCenter CX NEWS" uses the song Eternity by Capsule.
- "Singing About Whatever the Hell You Want" uses (and is named after) the song "Katte ni Shiyagare" by Kenji Sawada.
- "Retro Read-Aloud" uses the song Naturish by Marsh and Nox Vahn.
- "Everything Important in Life, I Learned From Video Game Strategy Guides" uses the theme song from the 1999 film The Road Home, by San-Bao.
- "A Waste of Color" uses the song Sailor Fuku o Nugasanai de by Onyanko Club;
- "Project CX" uses the song Earthly Stars by Miyuki Nakajima.
- "Barcode Battler" uses the songs Liar Game and Electrode Spark 0101 from Liar Game.
- "Famicom Sniper" uses a special arrangement of the Main Theme from Golgo 13: Top Secret Episode.
- "When I Looked Back, He Was There" uses the song "Yah Yah Yah" by Chage and Aska.
- "Game Center MSX" uses the song Overnight Success by Teri DeSario
- "DJ Monster Battle" uses the song "Anasthasia" by T99.
- "Chief Arino's Bonus Assessment" uses the song "En Aranjuez con Tu Amor" by David Garrett.
- "2P Battles Without Honor" uses the song Jingi Naki Tatakai from Battles Without Honor and Humanity.
- "Good-Bye Game Boy" uses the song Good Bye Natsuo by Aya Matsuura.
- "Until the Udon Boils" uses the song 634 (MUSASHI) from NHK Pro Yakyuu at the end of each episode.
- "Thursday Opening-Only Theatre" uses the song "Friday Night Fantasy" by Pierre Porte, popularized by Kinyō Roadshow.
- "KACHOxFAMILY" uses the song "Mixed Nuts" by Official Hige Dandism.
- "Dangerous Safety Zone" uses the song Wine Red no Kokoro by Anzen Chitai at the end of each episode.
- "chocoGAME" uses the song Hot Limit by T.M. Revolution during segment objectives.

=== Original songs ===
- Last Continue by former AD/AP Tomoaki Nakayama
- Sayonara Game by former AD Yuko Watanabe
- Tatakae! Kacho Fighter by producer Nozomi Ishida
- Momoko-chan Koi Uta by former AD Takeshi Tsuruoka (originally from Tokaido Gojusan Tsugi)
- Last Continue (English version) by former AD/AP Tomoaki Nakayama
- Ken o Nuke! GCCX MAX by multiple staff from the show as Messe Messe Club (Gen Matsui, Yuta Kaga, Kouichi Abe, Ryo Osuka)
- ENDINGRATULATION by accekk (writer Masayuki Kibe and former AD Tasuku Iwahashi's band duo)

== Media ==
=== Video games ===
At the end of the sixth season, it was announced that there were plans to make a GameCenter CX video game. The game, entitled GameCenter CX: Arino no Chōsenjō, was developed for the Nintendo DS as a collaborative effort between Fuji TV and Bandai Namco Games. During the seventh season, certain parts of the show featured the development process of the game. The game was released in Japan on November 15, 2007, and in North America by Xseed Games on February 10, 2009, under the title Retro Game Challenge. A second game, GameCenter CX: Arino no Chōsenjō 2, was released in Japan on February 26, 2009. Xseed Games has stated that US release of the game is unlikely, due to its predecessor's not catching enough attention from the North American gaming community. A third game, GameCenter CX: 3-Chōme no Arino, was released in Japan on March 20, 2014, and was the first installment in the series to release on Nintendo 3DS.

Arino appears as a Mystery Mushroom figure in Super Mario Maker, which is unlocked by clearing one of his Event Courses added to the game on November 4, 2015.

A remaster of the first two games on Nintendo DS, named GameCenter CX: Arino no Chōsenjō 1+2 REPLAY for the Nintendo Switch was announced by Fuji TV and is set to be released only in Japan by February 22, 2024. Currently, no news of English localization from either Fuji TV or Bandai Namco has been announced.

=== Books ===
Several books of the show have been manufactured and released by Ohta Publishing from 2004 to 2011. These books cover secrets and interviews with the TV show's staff:

- GameCenter 「CX」 (ISBN 487233907X)
- GameCenter CX2 (ISBN 4778310195)
- GameCenter CX3 (ISBN 4778310454)
- GameCenter CX COMPLETE (ISBN 9784778311803)
- GameCenter CX V (ISBN 978-4-7783-1290-9)
- GameCenter CX CHRONICLE

The Japanese Magazine CONTINUE (also from Ohta Publishing) has a frequent habit of interviewing Arino over the years as well.

=== CD ===
GameCenter CX 10th Anniversary Soundtrack (HMCM-1120) is a music CD containing 16 tracks used in the show, manufactured by Happinet. Some of the tracks are part of the original songs, others are Staff themes and standard game music from games that Arino played in the show. It was released on July 24, 2013, as a part of the show's 10th anniversary.

BONUS STAGE (LNCM-1454) is a music CD from accekk (also called AXK, created by Staff writer Kibe and named by Arino), manufactured by Mastard Records. It was released March 4, 2023. Of the 9 tracks included, two of them, ENDINGRATULATION and ASSISTANTDIRe:CTION, are used in the TV show.

=== Theatrical Film ===
GameCenter CX: The Movie - 1986 Mighty Bomb Jack was released on February 22, 2014, to commemorate the 10th anniversary of the show. It features excerpts of the Mighty Bomb Jack episodes alongside a fictional side-story set in 1986 focused on a boy named Daisuke constructing a love relationship with a girl named Kumiko by borrowing his cartridge. As with the show's DVDs, it was distributed by Happinet.

=== Spin-Offs & Advertising ===
Biohazard EX (SDS-12863) is a special bonus DVD that came with early pre-orders from Japanese copies of Resident Evil: Extinction in Blu-Ray, DVD, and UMD discs, manufactured by SPEJ. The disc itself includes an interview with Arino discussing his thoughts on Resident Evil games and movies, as well excerpts of the Capcom episode from the show's first season. It was not sold as a retail disc.

THE Game Maker was a series of DVDs focused on a variety of content from video game companies, as a tribute to the show's first season. It features Arino & Yoshiuki Hirai doing playthroughs with live commentary, as well as extended Game Collections, interviews, and other kinds of extras (varying by disc). These DVDs were manufactured between 2010 and 2011. The companies featured were Irem, Jaleco, Namco, Sega, Sunsoft, Taito and Tecmo (the Sega edition was sold in a DVD box with two DVDs rather than a single one).

GameCenter DX, starring another challenger (Masaru Hamaguchi, the other half of star Arino Kacho's comedy duo "Yoiko"), and featuring many staff of the original, began in 2015 to showcase contemporary Nintendo titles, such as the latest entries in the Mario Bros. and Starfox series.

Yowiko no xx de xx Seikatsu (Yoiko's Everyday Life in [something]) is a spin-off of both GameCenter CX and GameCenter DX, featuring Arino and Hamaguchi playing games for Nintendo Switch and being run by Nintendo's Japanese YouTube channel since 2017. Notable games played by the duo are Minecraft: Nintendo Switch Edition, Super Mario Maker 2 and Nintendo Switch Sports.

Since 2023, the TV show's official YouTube channel made Arino do collaboration crossovers with known personalities from Japan, such as Eiko Kano's CritiKano Hit, Nijisanji's Hyakumantenbara Salome and Masahiro Sakurai on Creating Games.

=== Nintendo eShop-exclusive specials ===
On occasion, special GameCenter CX programs were produced for the Nintendo Channel for the Wii.

Later, when the Nintendo eShop succeeded the Nintendo Channel, additional specials were produced, such as a special where Arino and late Nintendo president Satoru Iwata interviewed each other and played Balloon Fight, which Iwata had programmed during the early years of his career.
