= Sarakurayama Cable Car =

Japanese funicular line

Coordinates: 33°50′48.2″N 130°47′42.7″E

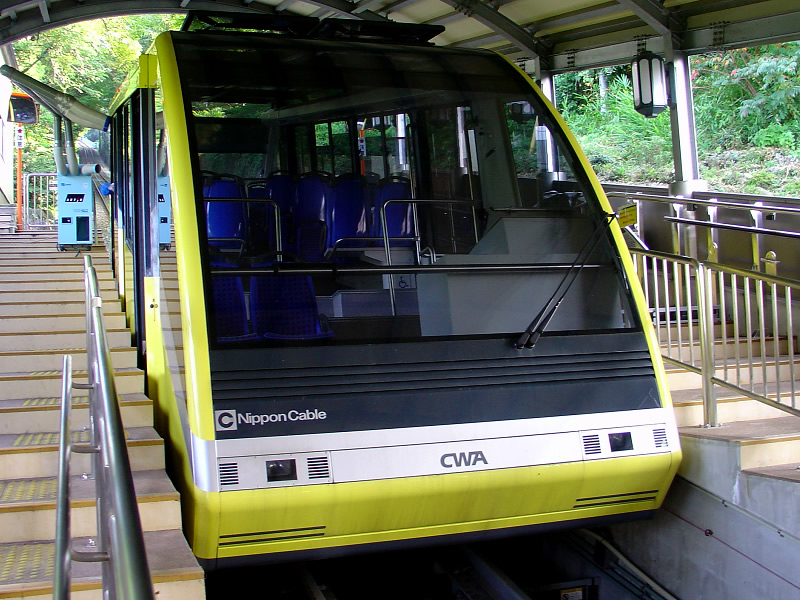
Hobashira Cable funicular

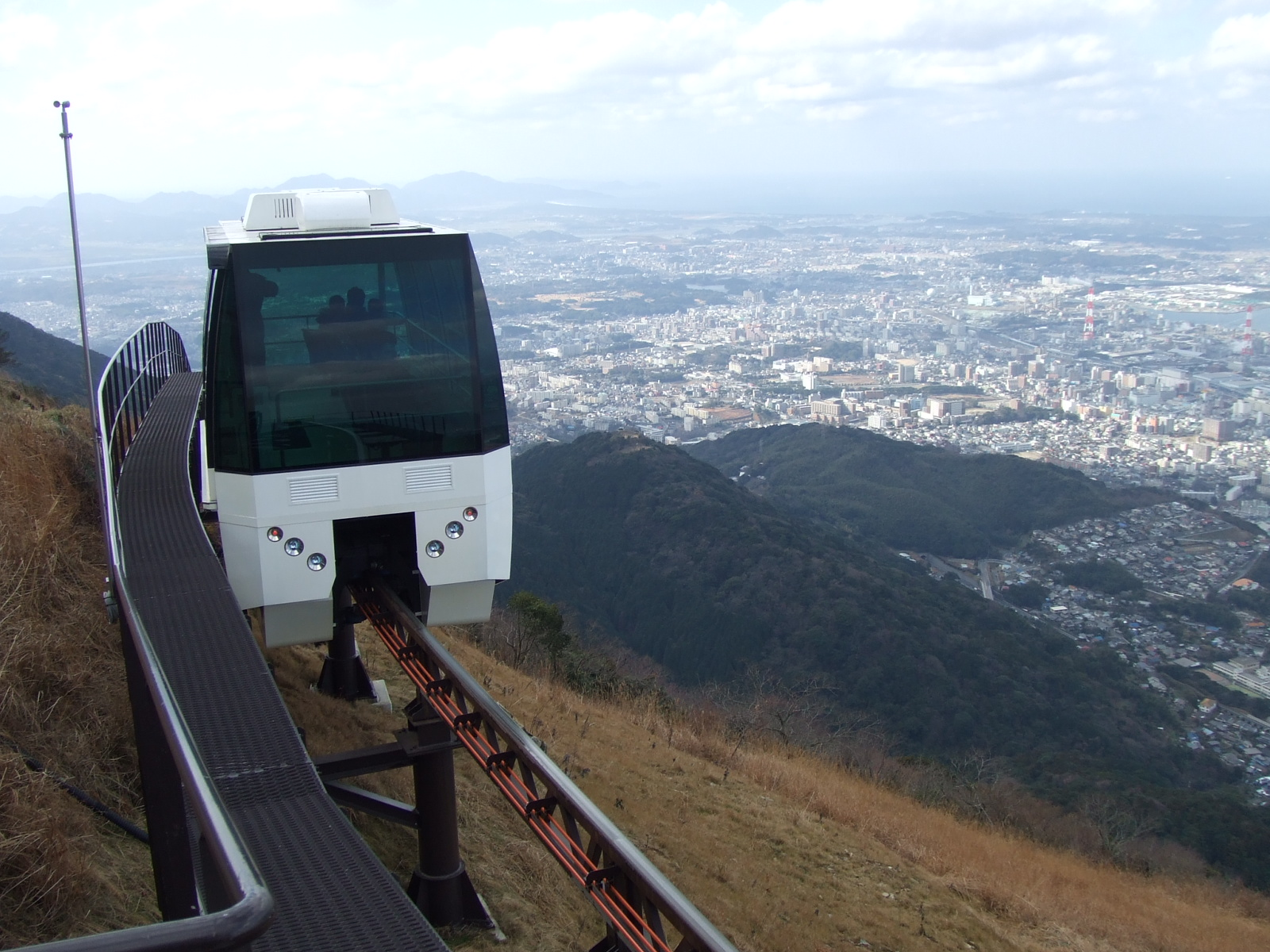
Sarakurayama Slope Car

The Sarakurayama Cable Car (皿倉山ケーブルカー, Sarakurayama Kēburukā), formerly (until March 2015) known as the Hobashira Cable (帆柱ケーブル, Hobashira Kēburu), is a Japanese funicular line operated by the Sarakurayama Tozan Railway Company. The line climbs Mount Sarakura in Kitakyūshū, Fukuoka. The company is fully owned by the city of Kitakyūshū. It opened in 1957.

The company also operates Sarakurayama Slope Car (皿倉山スロープカー, Sarakurayama Surōpukā). It links the funicular terminus and the top of the mountain.

== Basic data ==
- Distance: 1.1 km or 0.68 mi
- Gauge: 1,067 mm or 3 ft 6 in.
- Stations: 2
- Vertical interval: 440 m or 1,444 ft.

== See also ==
- Mount Sarakura
- List of funicular railways
- List of railway companies in Japan
- List of railway lines in Japan
