= Kayoko Okubo =

Japanese comedian, tarento and actress (born 1971)

- 大久保 佳代子
- Born: May 12, 1971 (age 54); Tahara, Aichi, Japan
- Education: Aichi Prefectural Seishō High School; Chiba University Faculty of Letters Literature Department
- Occupations: Comedian, Tarento, actress
- Years active: 1992–
- Agent: Production Jinrikisha
- Known for: Tabi Zukin-chan: Zennihon no Hoho – 'n Onagokai; Ariyoshi's Meeting for Reviewing; Ippuku!; Hakunetsu Live Vivid; One Mus series; Joshi-ana no Batsu; Dankubo; SKE48 no Ebi Friday Night; SKE48 Ebisho!; SKE48 Ebi Calcio!
- Website: Oasiz official profile

Kayoko Okubo (大久保 佳代子, Ōkubo Kayoko; born May 12, 1971, in Tahara, Aichi, Japan) is a Japanese comedian, tarento and actress who is a member of the comedy duo Oasiz with Yasuko Mitsuura.

== Filmography ==
=== TV series ===
==== Current appearances ====
Year	Title	Network	Notes	Ref.
2013	Go Go Smi: Go Go! Smile!	CBC	Monday regular	
2013	Tabi Zukin-chan: Zennihon no Hoho – 'n Onagokai	CBC	MC	
2013	Ariyoshi's Meeting for Reviewing	NTV	Panelist; Irregular appearances	
	Tonneruzu no Minasan no Okage deshita	Fuji TV	Irregular appearances	
	Uramayo!	KTV	Quasi-regular appearances	
2015	Shumi Doki!	NHK E TV		
	Yasashī Hitonara Tokeru Quiz Yasashī ne	Fuji TV		

==== Former appearances ====
Year	Title	Network	Notes	Ref.
	Cream Nantoka	TV Asahi		
	London Hearts	TV Asahi		
	Guadalcanal Taka no Kochira DERU Toko Henshū-bu	BS-TBS		
2008	Onegai! Muscat	TV Tokyo	Guest	
	Shirushiru Sunday	TV Asahi	VTR member; Irregular appearances	
2009	Onegai!! Muscat	TV Tokyo	Guest	
2009	Tantei X Kara no Chōsen-jō	NHK G TV		
2010	Choi to Muscat!	TV Tokyo	Guest	
2010	Onedari Muscat DX!	TV Tokyo	Guest	
2010	Cha$e	Fuji TV		
2010	Okubo × Torii × Britney 3P	Tokyo MX		
	Seken no Uragawa Nozoki Mi Variety Uramayo!	KTV	Quasi-regular appearance	
2011	Nishikata Emido	NHK G TV, NHK BS Premium		
2011	Onedari Muscat DX!	TV Tokyo	Guest	
2012	Joshi-ana no Batsu	TBS	MC	
2013	Dai Tensai Terebi-kun	NHK E TV		
2013	Dankubo	TV Asahi	MC	
2013	FNS27 Jikan TV Joshidjikara Zenkai 2013 Otome no Egao ga Ashita o Tsukuru!!	Fuji TV	MC	
2013	Otonahe to Tobira TV	NHK E TV		
2013	SKE48 no Ebi Friday Night	NTV	MC	
2013	Okubo Jā Night	TBS	MC	
2014	SKE48 Ebisho!	NTV	MC	
2014	Margarin Ginkō	Tokyo MX, BS11	General manager; MC	
2014	SKE48 Ebi Calcio!	NTV	MC	
2014	Ippuku!	TBS	Friday regular	
2014	Oku Bonbon	TBS	MC	
2015	Hakunetsu Live Vivid	TBS	Monday regular	
2015	Tsuki Bi no Kayoko Okubo	CBC		

==== Drama ====
Year	Title	Role	Network	Notes
2001	heaven cannot wait	Blind date partner	TBS	Episode 6
2008	K-tai Investigator 7	Anchor stop store manager	TV Tokyo	
2010	Rikon Dōkyo	Shizu Ogasawara	NHK G TV	
2011	She's a steely woman!	Kazuya Sakai's mother	TV Asahi	
2011	Ihin Seiri Hito Aiko Tanizaki II	Yumi Nakazono / Misaki Fujiwara	MBS	
2013	Machigawa re Chatta Otoko	Chiho Sumiyoshi	Fuji TV	Episode 4
2013	Shiawase ni Naru 3-ttsu no Kaimono "'Ī ne!' O Katta Onna"	Kanako Horiuchi	KTV	Lead role
2013	Amachan	Apartment woman	NHK	Episode 73
2013	Summer Nude	Yukiko	Fuji TV	Episode 7
2013	Toshi Densetsu no Onna Part 2	Junko Takada	TV Asahi	
2014	Yonimo Kimyōna Monogatari		Fuji TV	
2015	San-biki no Ossan 2: Seiginomikata, Futatabi!!	Michiko Nakazawa	TV Tokyo	Episode 3

==== Other TV series ====
Year	Title	Network	Notes
2010	Dai tsuiseki! Ano News no Tsuzuki	KTV	Reporter
2013	24 Hour Television "Love Saves The Earth"	NTV	
2013	64th NHK Kōhaku Uta Gassen	NHK G TV	
2014	Studio Park Kara Konnichiwa	NHK	
2014	Kansha Kanreki Nagoya Special Live	NHK Nagoya	MC
2014	AKB48 Dai 6-kai Senbatsu Sō Senkyo Namahōsō SP	Fuji TV	Studio guest

==== Advertisements ====
Year	Title	Notes	Ref.
2013	"Christmas Animation TV-CM"		
2013	"Oshōgatsu o Utsusou 2014 Tsurumatsu-ka no Shinnenkai"		
2014	"Boss Green"		
2014	"Cash Back Campaign"		
2014	"2014-nen Nenmatsu Jumbo 7 Oku-en & Nenmatsu Jumbo Mini 7000 Man: Rival Tōjō"		
2015			

=== Radio series ===
Year	Title	Network	Notes
	Ukesuta	FM Gunma	
2008	Makoto Otake Golden Radio!	NCB	
2013	Pipitto Sunday Waku Waku Mix	NCB	
2015	Gocha Mazettengoku!	MBS Radio	Main MC

=== Films ===
Year	Title	Role	Notes
2003	Baka Blossom! Baka Furo		
2006	Memories of Matsuko	Okano's wife	
2009	Three Day Boys		
2010	Kurosawa Eiga		
2012	Chronicle of My Mother	Jokyu	
2012	Love Masao-kun ga Iku!	Tae Murakami	
2014	Jane Ueshima Beyond		
2014	Ushijima the Loan Shark Part 2	Minako Satonaka	
2015	Mortdecai	Georgina Clamp (Olivia Munn)	Dubbing
2017	Cat Collector's House	Real estate agent	
2018	Love × Doc	Chigusa Hosoya	
2020	A Beloved Wife		
2021	A Day with No Name		
2021	The Cinematic Liars of Asahi-za		
