= Mount Sarakura =

Mountain in Japan

- 皿倉山 Sakakura-yama
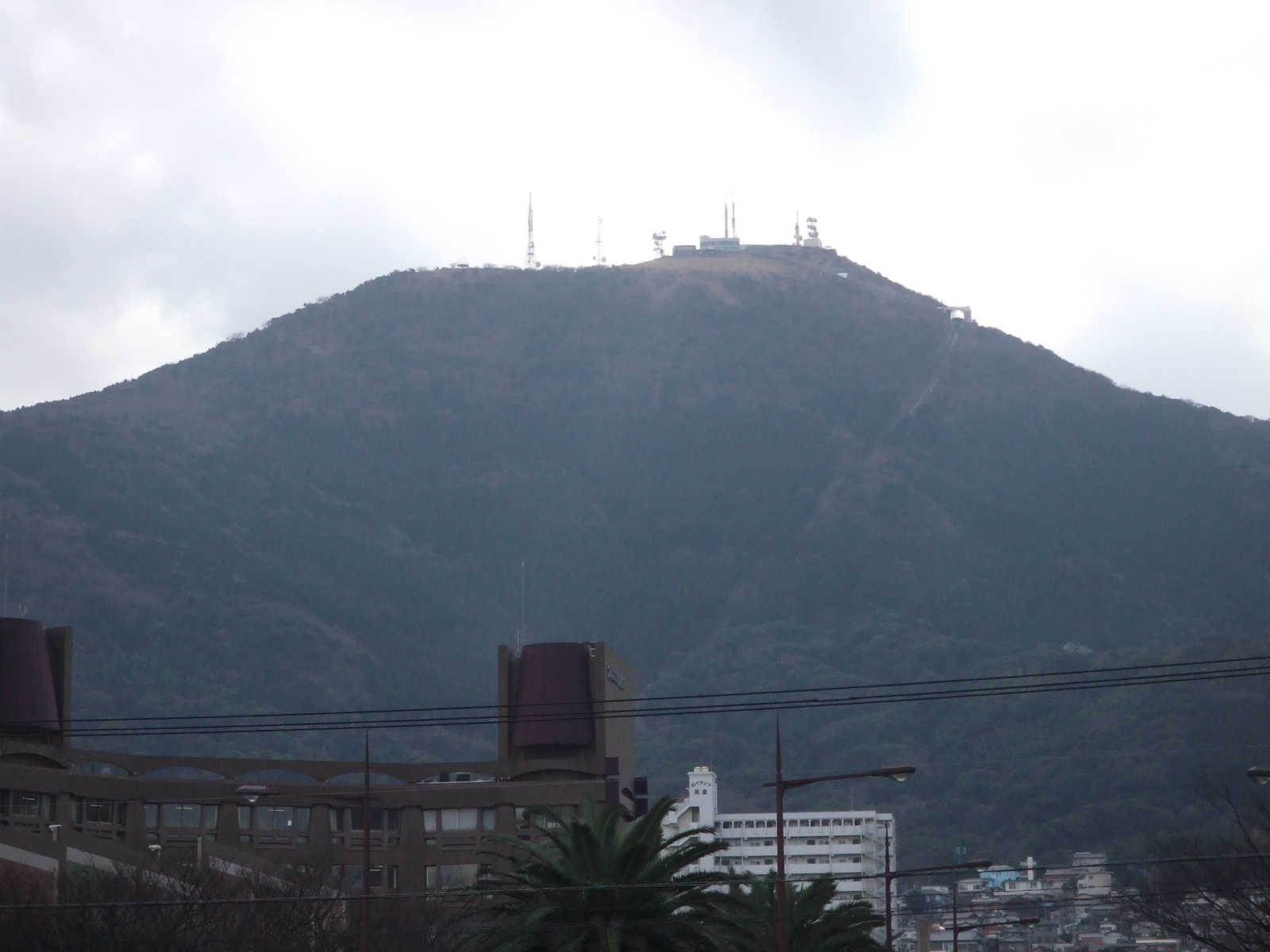

Highest point
- Elevation: 622 m (2,041 ft)
- Coordinates: 33°50′47″N 130°47′47″E

Geography
- Location within Japan
- Location: Yahatahigashi-ku, Kitakyūshū, Fukuoka, Japan
- Parent range: Hobashira Mountains

Mount Sarakura (皿倉山, Sarakura-yama) is a 622 m (2,041 ft) mountain in Yahatahigashi-ku, Kitakyūshū, Fukuoka, Japan. This mountain is a part of Kitakyūshū Quasi-National Park.

== Outline ==
Mount Sarakura is one of the major peaks of the Hobashira Mountains, and the most popular peak for visitors on the mountains. The Sarakurayama Cable Car and Sarakurayama Slope Car allow visitors to travel to the top from Yahata. A short walk from the slope car station are several buildings that house transmitters for TV and radio stations that serve Kitakyushu and the surrounding area.

There is an observation platform that is visited by tourists as it provides views of Kitakyushu's "10 Million Dollar Night View" (one of the New Three Major Night Views of Japan). (新日本三大夜景) in 2003.

== Gallery ==
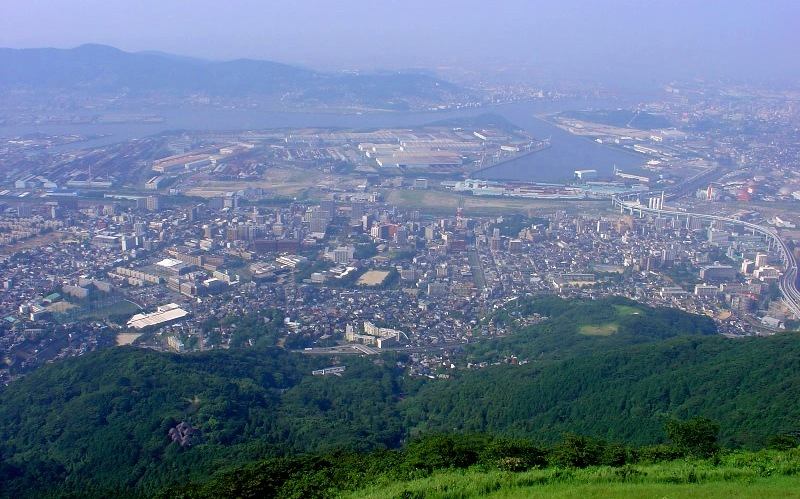
Overlooking Yahatahigashi Ward from the top of Mount Sarakura.

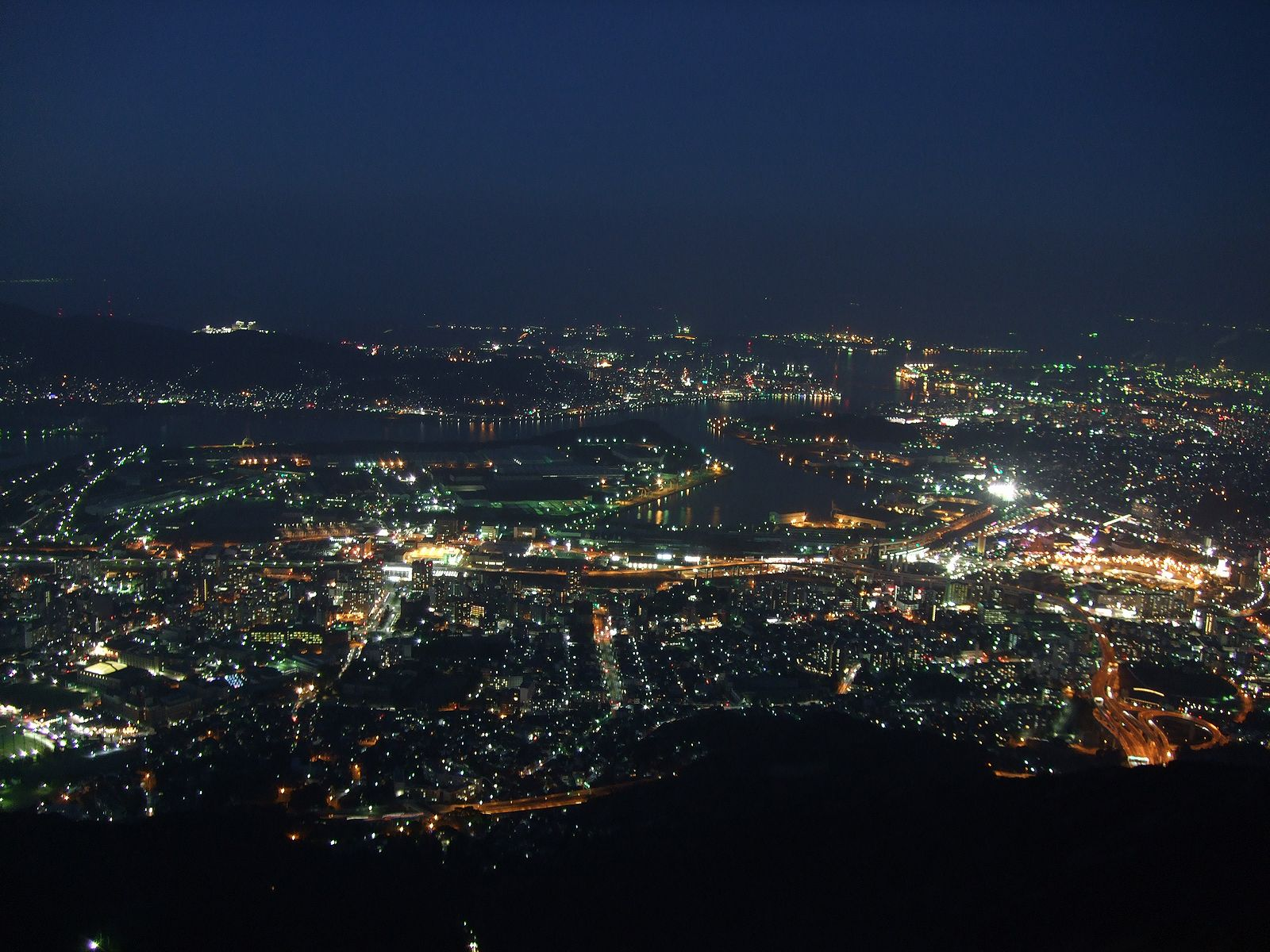
A night view from the top

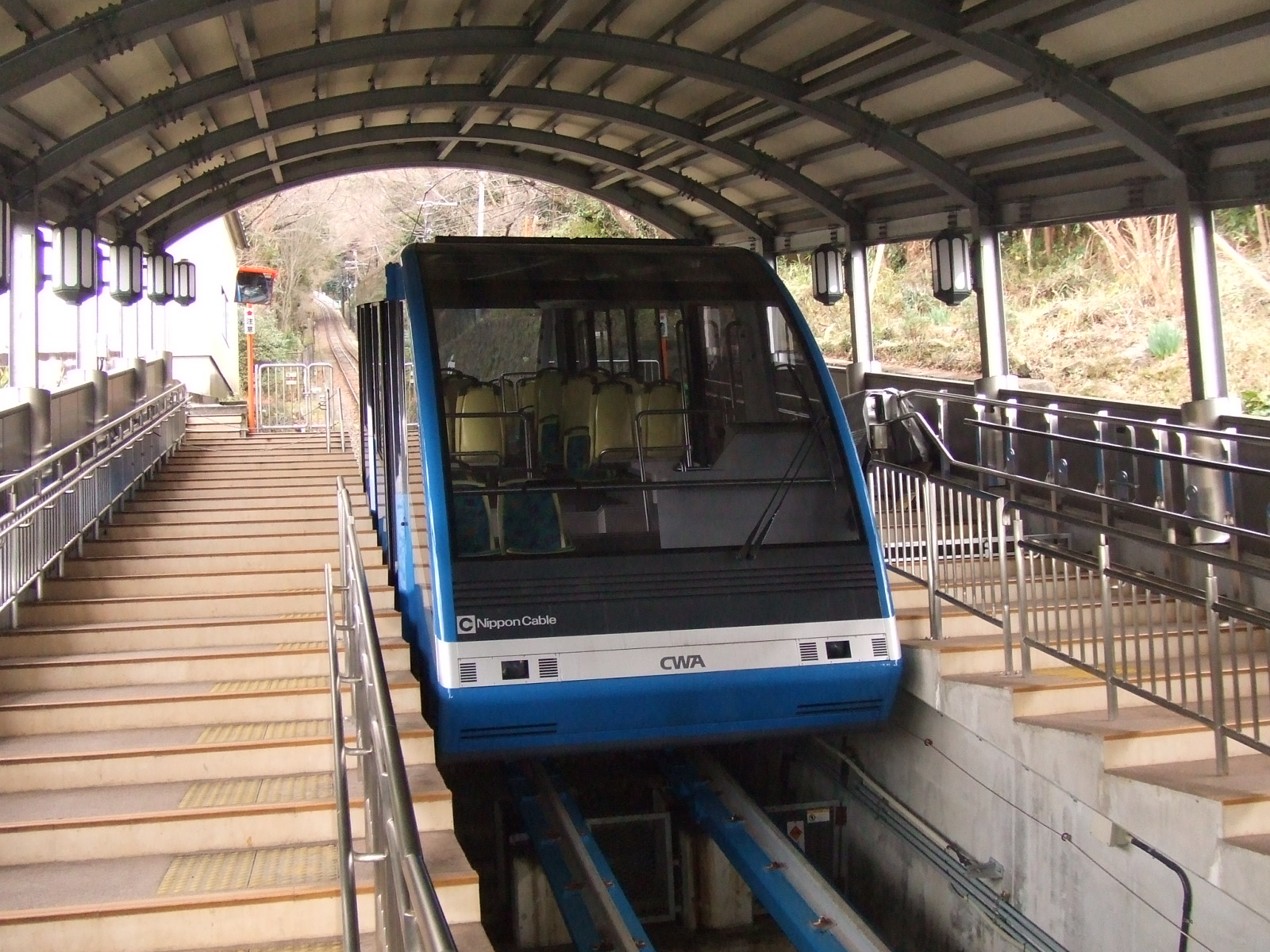
Hobashira Cable Car

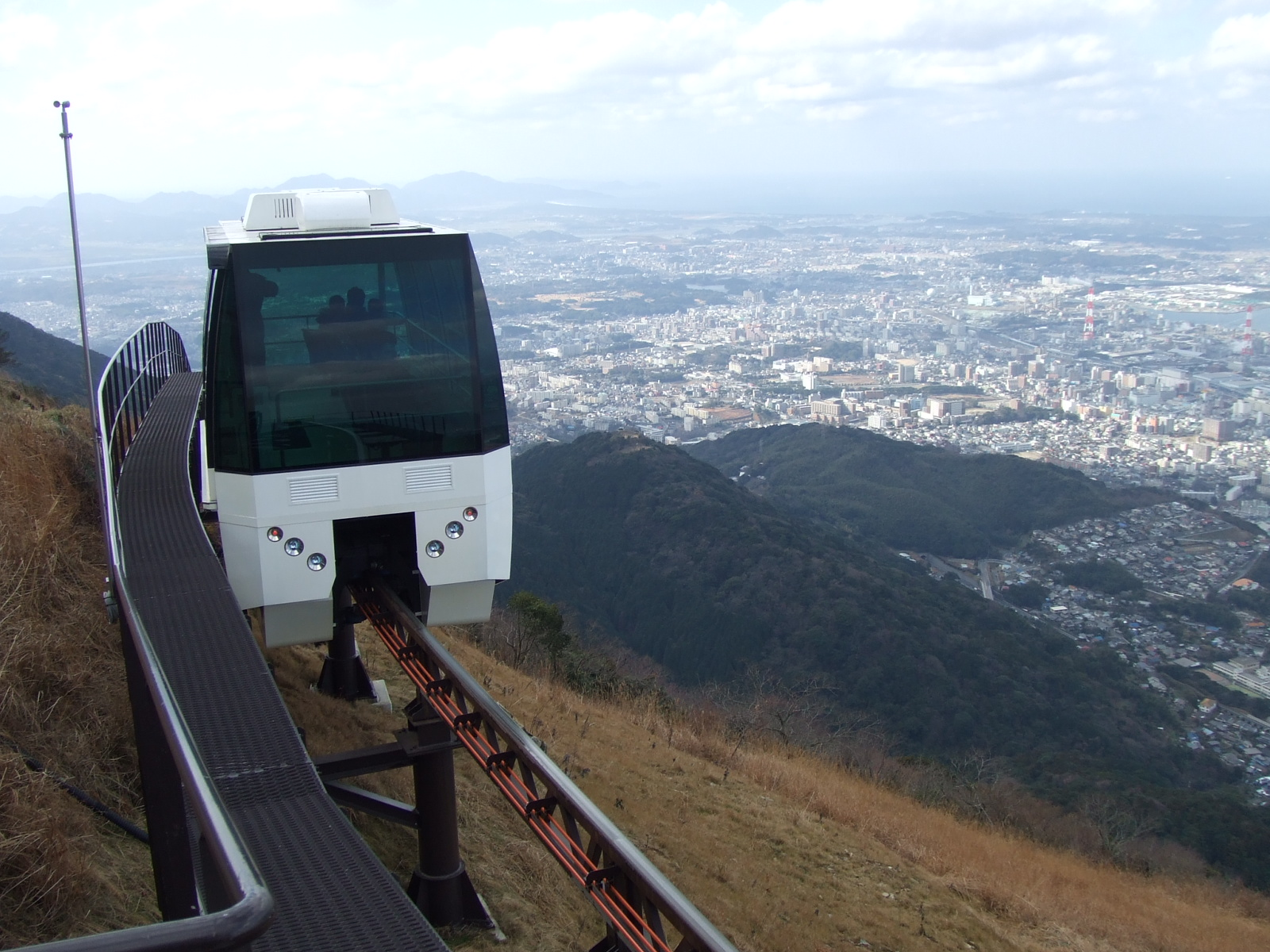
Sarakurayama Slope Car

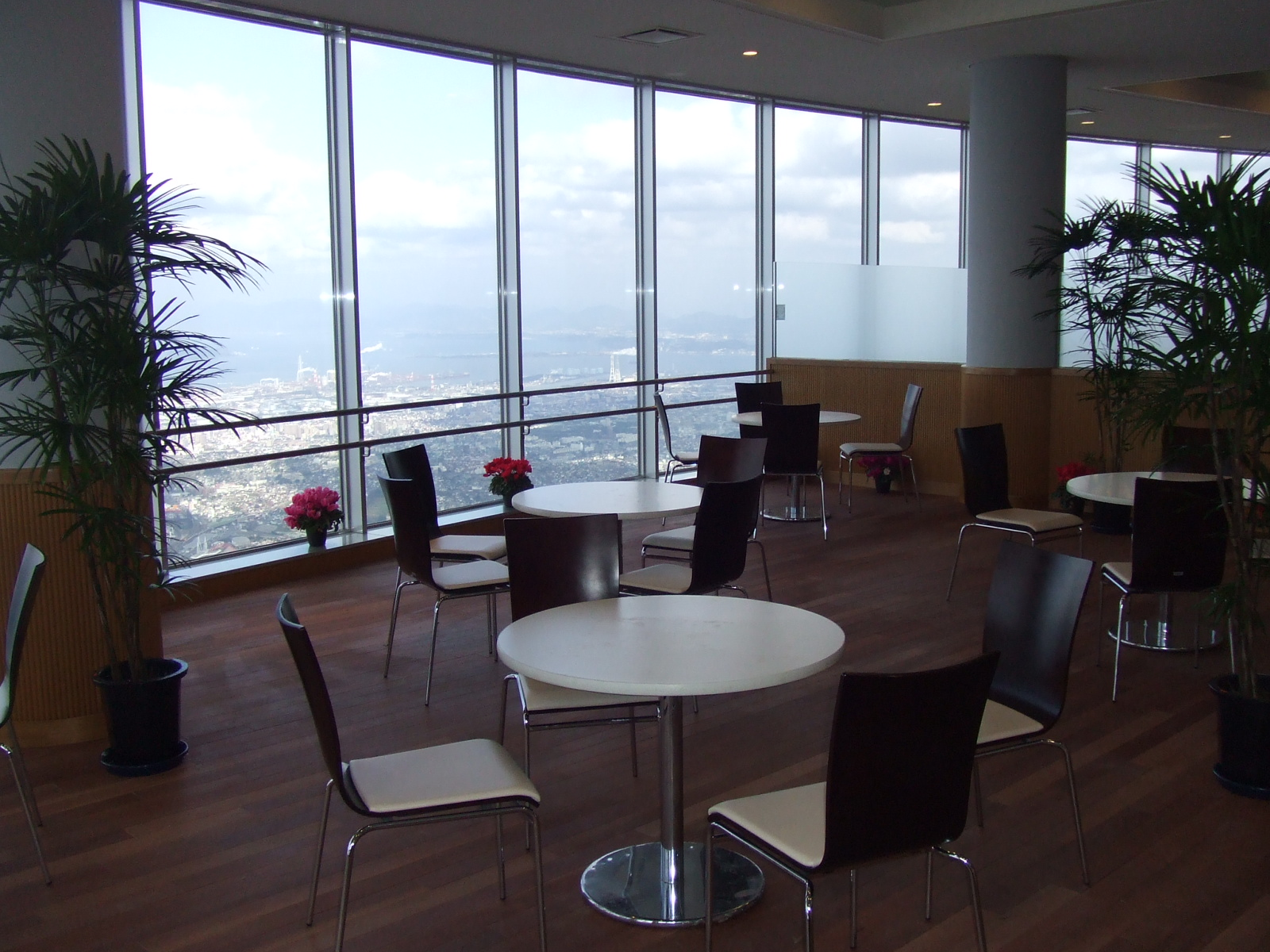
A view of the Kitakyushu skyline from an observation platform.

== See also ==
- Hobashira Cable
