= Television Nishinippon =

JOJY-DTV JOHX-TV (defunct)
- Logo used since 1981

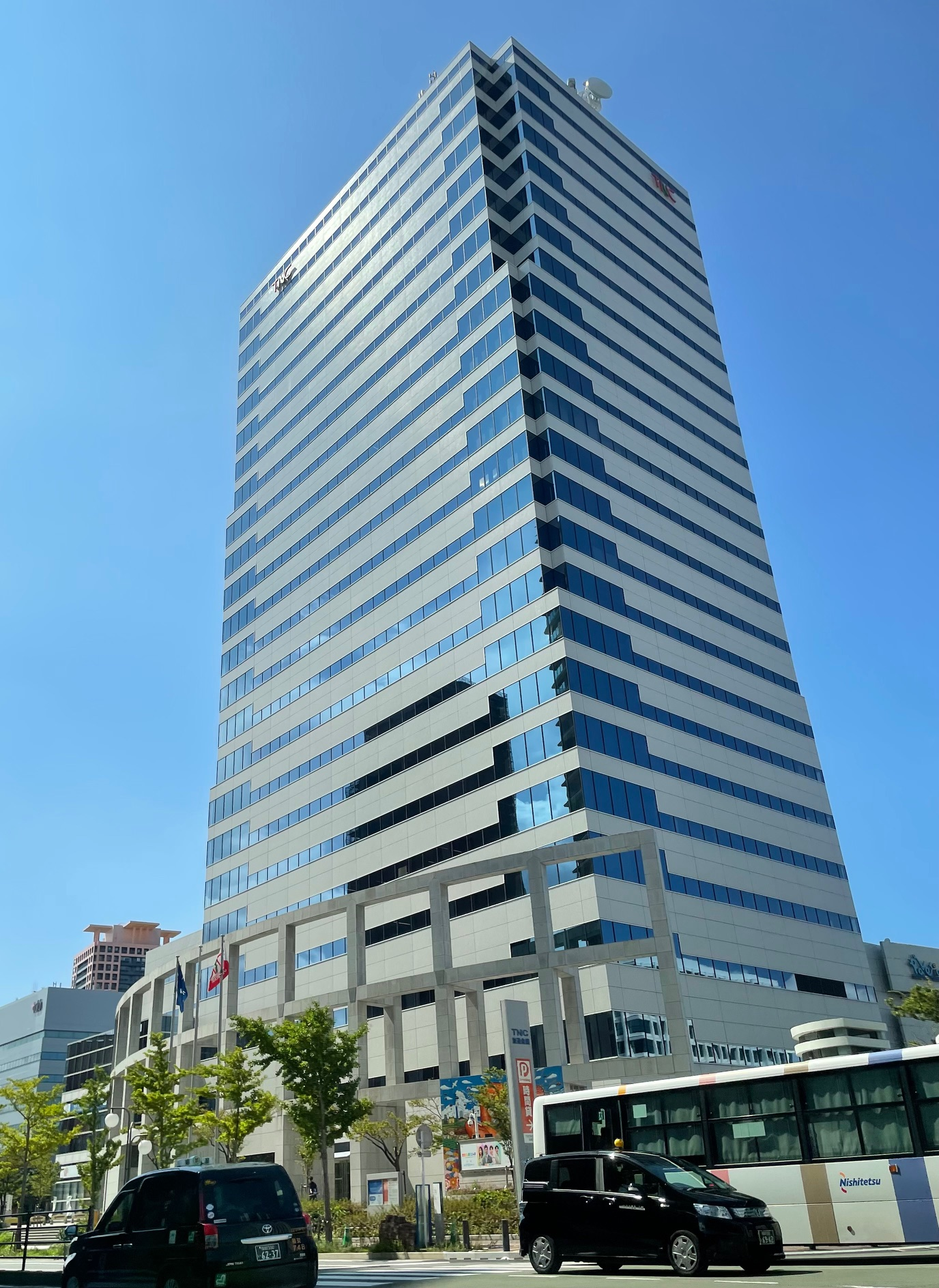
- Headquarters in Sawara-ku, Fukuoka
- Fukuoka Prefecture; Japan
- City: Fukuoka
- Channels: Digital: 34 (UHF); Virtual: 8
- Branding: Television Nishinippon; TNC

Programming
- Language: Japanese
- Affiliations: Fuji News Network and Fuji Network System

Ownership
- Owner: Television Nishinippon Corporation

History
- First air date: August 28, 1958
- Last air date: July 24, 2011 (JOHX-TV)
- Former call signs: JOHX-TV (1958–1974); JOJY-TV (1974–2011)
- Former channel numbers: 9 (analog VHF, 1962–2011); JOHX-TV: 10 (analog VHF, 1958–2011)
- Former affiliations: NTV (1958–1964)

Technical information
- Licensing authority: MIC

Links
- Website: tnc.co.jp

Corporate information
- Company
- Native name: 株式会社テレビ西日本
- Romanized name: Kabushikigaisha Terebinishinihon
- Type: Kabushiki gaisha
- Industry: Television broadcasting
- Founded: April 1, 1958; 68 years ago
- Headquarters: Momochihama, Sawara-ku, Fukuoka City, Fukuoka Prefecture, Japan
- Key people: Kazuo Terasaki (chairman); Yuichi Kawano (president and CEO)
- Subsidiaries: VSQ; TNC Production

Television Nishinippon Corporation (Japanese: 株式会社テレビ西日本, Hepburn: Kabushiki Gaisha Terebi Nishinihon; TNC) is a Japanese TV station affiliated with Fuji News Network and Fuji Network System in Fukuoka. This station serves Fukuoka Prefecture and also acts as the default FNN affiliate for western portions of Yamaguchi Prefecture including Yamaguchi City and Shimonoseki, as Yamaguchi Prefecture does not have an FNN affiliate of its own.

== History ==
=== 1950s founding ===
In 1957, the Ministry of Posts and Telecommunications announced the first TV channel plan. In Fukuoka Prefecture, operators such as "Nishinippon Television" funded by Nishinippon Shimbun and "Kyushu Asahi Broadcasting" funded by Asahi Shimbun applied for a TV broadcasting license. On October 22, 1957, Television Nishinippon received a preliminary license conditionally on the premise of "merging with Kyushu Asahi Broadcasting as much as possible". Therefore, Nishinippon TV's investment ratio at that time was 70% for Nishinippon Shimbun and 30% for Asahi Shimbun. At the second founder meeting held on January 7, 1958, Television Nishinippon decided to build a signal transmitting station in Mount Sarakura, Yawata City. On April 1 of the same year, Television Nishinippon officially registered and established a company. Since one of Tokyo's two flagship stations, Radio Tokyo Television, had a network relationship with RKB Mainichi Broadcasting in Fukuoka Prefecture at that time, Television Nishinippon management decided to air Nippon Television programming instead.

In 1959, TNC established a labor union.

=== 1960s ===
On March 18, 1961, due to the breakdown of wage negotiations between labor and management, the TNC union launched a week-long strike. In March of the following year, TNC also experienced a large-scale strike when its labor union occupied a signal transmitting station, resulting in Television Nishinippon suspending broadcasts from March 24 to April 7.

Since Fukuoka Prefecture was divided into two broadcasting areas, Kitakyushu and Fukuoka, TNC obtained the broadcasting license for the Kitakyushu area (Kyushu Asahi Broadcasting obtained the Fukuoka area broadcasting license), so TNC initially only transmitted signals in the Kitakyushu area. In the summer of 1960, both TNC and KBC stated that they had no intention of merging with each other. At the same time, TNC began to try to include the Fukuoka area into the broadcasting area, and obtained the consent of the MPT and Kyushu Asahi Broadcasting. Afterwards, TNC purchased land in Kamitakamiya Town, Fukuoka City, to build its Fukuoka headquarters, which was completed in 1962. On February 14 of the same year, TNC began broadcasting its signals in the Fukuoka area.

JOHX-TV was originally established as an affiliate of Nippon Television (NTV) in Yahata (Yahata Higashi-ku, Kitakyūshū) in August 1958, airing on VHF channel 9; a station in Fukuoka was established in February 1962 as JOJY-TV. They changed affiliation from NTV to Fuji Television in October 1964 - changing their national programming to that of Fuji TV. The head office was moved to Fukuoka, and the call sign changed from "JOHX-TV" (still the call sign of Kitakyūshū satellite station (airing on VHF channel 10)) to "JOJY-TV" in December 1974. They relocated their office to its current location near Fukuoka Tower in August 1996. During the station's first 53 years of broadcasting, JOHX-TV's analog signal was receivable over-the-air in most of Yamaguchi Prefecture.

On July 20, 1966, TNC broadcast its first color program, Jungle Taitei, the first color anime. In April of the following year, 34% of its prime time programs were in color.

In 1967, TNC's turnover reached 2.2 billion yen, and its profit reached 400 million yen.

=== 1970s ===
In April 1970, all of TNC's prime time programs were in color, and 76.8% of all-day programs were in color. On April 30, 1971, the small plane in which Koga Masaaki, an employee of Television Nishinippon, crashed while collecting news, and died in the line of duty.

In the first week of January 1973, Television Nishinippon won the prime-time ratings championship for the first time with a ratings of 19.4%. The following year, while Television Nishinippon carried out a large-scale expansion of its Fukuoka headquarters, it also moved the company's registration headquarters and main control room and other important facilities from Yawata City to Fukuoka City. On November 13 of the same year, Television Nishinippon began transmitting signals from Takamiya's headquarters. Television Nishinippon introduced the electronic news gathering (ENG) system in 1979, which greatly improved the efficiency of news gathering and editing.

=== 1980s and 1990s ===
In 1980, TNC began to implement the two-day weekend system. In 1981, Television Nishinippon introduced corporate identity and launched a new logo. In the same year, TNC signed a sister station agreement with KGMB-TV in Hawaii, becoming its first overseas sister station. In 1982, TNC began broadcasting stereo TV programs. TNC signed a sister station agreement with China's Dalian Television in 1986, the second such agreement. In 1987, TNC's turnover exceeded 10 billion yen for the first time. In 1989, TNC introduced the Satellite News Broadcasting (SNG) system. In the same year, TNC won the triple crown of ratings for the first time with average ratings of 9.2% for the whole day, 16.4% for prime time, and 16% for evening time. From then until 1996, Television Nishinippon won the triple crown of ratings for eight consecutive years.

=== 2000s and 2010s ===
In 2003, Television Nishinippon won the triple crown of ratings again after 7 years.

TNC also further strengthened international cooperation at the turn of the century. In 1999, Television Nishinippon and South Korea's PSB Busan Broadcasting signed a cooperation agreement. In 2002, it signed a sister station agreement with France 3. In the same year, TNC also co-produced a program with South Korea's PSB Busan Broadcasting. In 2004, Television Nishinippon, Dalian TV and Busan Broadcasting held a director's meeting and issued a joint declaration to strengthen cooperation. Since then, the three TV stations have jointly produced programs many times.

Digital broadcasts on JOJY-TV began on 1 July 2006, and the analog signal continued to broadcast until 24 July 2011, when JOHX-TV (which served northern portions of Fukuoka Prefecture and western portions of Yamaguchi Prefecture) ceased operations.
