= Yoiko (comedy duo) =

Japanese double act from Osaka also known as "Yoiko"

- よゐこ
- Other name: Yowiko (Note: "Yowiko" is pronounced "Yoiko" as "wi" (ゐ) is nearly-obsolete kana that merged into the "i" (い) sound in contemporary Japanese.)
- Employer: Shochiku Geino

Comedy career
- Years active: 1990–present
- Genre: Owarai
- Members: Masaru Hamaguchi (tsukkomi); Shinya Arino (boke)
- Website: www.shochikugeino.co.jp/talents/yoiko/

Notes
- Same year/generation as: Ninety-nine; TKO; Hanamaru-Daikichi Hakata

Yoiko (Japanese: よゐこ, Hepburn: Yowiko) is a Japanese comic duo from Konohana-ku, Osaka that is employed by the comedy talent agency Shochiku Geino.

Yoiko are known otakus, even appearing on the variety show LINCOLN cosplaying as Char Aznable and Amuro Ray of the Gundam anime series and taking Downtown to Akihabara.

== Members ==
- Shinya Arino (有野 晋哉, Arino Shin'ya) plays the boke. Enjoys anime and video games. Best known for GameCenter CX.
- Masaru Hamaguchi (濱口 優, Hamaguchi Masaru) plays the tsukkomi. Enjoys online games.

The duo (kombi) was originally formed under the pretense of Shinya Arino as the boke (stooge) and Masaru Hamaguchi as the tsukkomi (straightman), but as time went on and Hamaguchi's "natural stupidness" started to shine through, the duo became known as "the duo with no real distinction between the boke and the tsukkomi".

== History ==
Though Arino and Hamaguchi attended different schools in their junior high years, they met and became friends through the same juku. They then went to the same senior high school, and upon graduation, Arino became a cook at a hotel. He decided to join Hamaguchi to form a comedy duo when Hamaguchi told him, "If you enter the entertainment world, you'll have a chance at marrying Noriko Sakai." They went with Shōchiku instead of the more famed Yoshimoto because they believed the competition in Yoshimoto was too great and thought they had a better chance at success in Shōchiku.

Their combo name at first was Arino & Hamaguchi, then Namekuji, before settling with Yowiko. The name of the duo incorporates the hiragana "wi" character (ゐ) which has long been phased out of everyday use. While the character historically had a different pronunciation from the common "i" character (い), in modern use and for the many years leading up until it was phased out it was generally accepted that they were pronounced the same. Hence, while a kana transliteration of the combi name would be "Yowiko", a phonetic transliteration would be written "Yoiko". This has been reflected on the official webpage of this owarai.
