= Shinya Arino =

Japanese comedian and actor (born 1972)

- 有野晋哉
- Born: February 25, 1972 (age 54); Konohana, Osaka, Osaka, Japan
- Other name: Arino Kachō (有野課長) (Note: Arino Kachō (有野課長; lit. 'Section Chief Arino'), often shortened to Kachō (課長), is the fictional title that Arino holds on GameCenter CX.)
- Employer: Shochiku Geino
- Notable work: GameCenter CX; Yoiko
- Spouse: Yuuko Kitamura (m. 2005)
- Children: 2

Comedy career
- Years active: 1990–present
- Medium: Television
- Genre: Owarai
- Website: www.shochikugeino.co.jp/talents/yoiko

Shinya Arino (Japanese: 有野 晋哉, Hepburn: Arino Shinya; born February 25, 1972) is a Japanese comedian and actor from Konohana-ku, Osaka. He is the boke of the manzai duo, Yoiko, with his partner Masaru Hamaguchi. He is best known outside Japan as the star of the long-running gaming variety show, GameCenter CX.

== Career ==
Arino and Hamaguchi were classmates that graduated high school and formed a manzai duo in 1990. The duo would make their first major televised appearance on Mecha-Mecha Iketeru! in 1996.

In 2003, Arino became the host of the gaming variety show, GameCenter CX, where he was initially tasked with interviewing video game developers before the format switched to a retrogaming focus. The show is often credited as a pioneer of video game commentary online.

== Appearances ==
- Mecha-Mecha Iketeru! (1996–2018)
- GameCenter CX (2003–present)

=== Films ===
Year	Title	Role	Ref.
2014	GameCenter CX: The Movie - 1986 Mighty Bomb Jack	Himself	
2017	Tomoshibi: Chōshi Dentetsu 6.4km no Kiseki	Yoichi Isozaki	
2018	The Seven Deadly Sins the Movie: Prisoners of the Sky	Celestial	
2022	Kaiki Taxi	Seizo Sasu	
2025	Mission: Sorta Possible		
2026	My Sister's Boyfriend	Nozawa	

== Bibliography ==
- Refrigerator (冷蔵庫, Reizōko; released 2004) ISBN 978-4391130041
- Child Rearing Strategy Guide for Growing Fathers (父も育つ子育て攻略本, Chichi mo Sodatsu Kosodate Kōryakubon; released 2010) ISBN 978-4861908569
- Shinya Arino and Akinori Tanaka's Wild Cuisine (有野晋哉と田中彰伯の妄想料理, Arino Shinya to Tanaka Akinori no Mōsō Ryōri; released 2017) ISBN 978-4751112922

== Personal life ==
Arino married the former TV personality Yuuko Kitamura on February 27, 2005, who later gave birth to two daughters in 2006 and 2007.

On May 30, 2008, Arino was briefly hospitalized for lung abscess. He was discharged from the hospital on June 16, 2008.
