= Monomane Grand Prix =

Monomane Grand Prix (ものまねグランプリ, Monomane Guran Puri) is an impersonation variety owarai special program broadcast on Nippon Television on May 3, 2009. It is a renewal of Monomane Battle, which ended its broadcast on January 4 earlier that year. Neptune serves as the presenters of the event with Hélène Hayama and Mika Oguma providing additional assistance, replacing the previous Naoko Ken and Hiromi.

== Rules ==
=== The Tournament ===
- The event is held in a tournament fashion, with groups of competitors divided into blocks beforehand.
- The contestants must prepare material for a match, the semifinal and the final.
- The 24 competitors are split into three sets of eight blocks. The semi-finals are made up of the winners of each block. The final consists of four contestants.
- The winner is awarded a prize of 1 million Yen (equivalent to approximately 10,000 dollars).

=== The Survival ===
- Personal one-on-one matches are decided through lottery cards.

== Presenters ==
=== Chairpeople ===
- Neptune
  - Jun Nagura
  - Ken Horiuchi
  - Taizō Harada

=== Progress ===
- Hélène Hayama
- Mika Oguma (The Survival)

== Contestants ==
=== The Tournament ===
Hiroiki Ariyoshi, Ungirls, Ijiri Okada, Satoshi Onoma and Twotone Aoki, Kannazuki, Kōji Tomita, Croket!, The Newspaper, Shinobu-chan, Tamiaki and Ryu, Chōshin Juku, Nakagawake, Yuki Nishio, Nobu and Fukkey, Hanawa, Akimasa Haraguchi, Vitamin S, Takashi Kanemitsu (of Plus Minus), Makita Sports, Monster Engine, Hōsei Yamasaki, Kōichi Yamadera

=== The Survival ===
Hiroiki Ariyoshi, Ungirls, Ijiri Okada, Kannazuki, Kuwabata Ohara, Kōji Tomita, Yoshio Kojima, Croket Sakurazuka Yakkun, The Touch, Zabunguru, Shinobu-chan and Megumi Fukushita and Maki Aizawa, Tamiaki and Yoppi, Chōshin Juku, Take2, Tony Hirota and Chihiro Sakurai and Kōenji Pulsar, Doburokki, Nakagawake, Yuki Nishio, Yūki Ninomiya, Nobu and Fukkey, Hanawa, Akimasa Haraguchi, Harō Ueda, Vitamin S, Takashi Kanemitsu (of Plus Minus), Hori, Ken Maeda, Mitchy, Hōsei Yamasaki, Kōichi Yamadera, Ryu and Twotone Aoki and Hazuki Pal

== Judges ==
=== The Tournament ===
Akira Nakao, Kunikazu Katsumata, Peeko, Miyuki Itori

=== The Survival ===
Tsutomu Sekine, Suzanne, Tsunku, Aya Sugimoto, Ayana Tsubaki

== Broadcast dates ==
Number	Subtitle	Broadcast date	Winner (MVP)	Ratings	Notes
1	~The Tournament~	May 3, 2009, 7:00 PM – 9:54 PM	Nakagawake	13.1%	
2	~The Survival~	September 21, 2009, 7:58 PM – 11:03 PM	Nakagawake		

== Results ==
=== First match ===
A Block

Rank	Order	Name	Office affiliation	Performance	Score
1st	2nd	Kannazuki	Ohta Production	Monomane All-Star	51
2nd	1st	Tamiaki and Ryu	Office Auto Home and Kojima Kikaku	EXILE performing "The Birthday: Ti Amo"	33
3rd	3rd	Vitamin S	Yoshimoto Creative Agency	Akira Kobayashi and Choi Ji-woo	16

B Block

Rank	Order	Name	Office affiliation	Performance	Score
1st	2nd	Takashi Kanemitsu (Plus Minus)	Yoshimoto Creative Agency	Kurin's Tamura dressing room call	48
2nd	3rd	Nobu and Fukkey	Em's Plan	Alice performing "Champion"	28
3rd	1st	Hanawa	K-Dash Stage	Keisuke Kuwata setting scenery	24

C Block

Rank	Order	Name	Office Affiliation	Performance	Score
1st	1st	Akimasa Haraguchi	K-Dash Stage	Junji Takada's 3-minute cooking	63
2nd	2nd	Shinobu-chan	Jinsei Pro	Kumi Kōda performing "Ai no Uta"	26
3rd	3rd	Monster Engine	Yoshimoto Creative Agency	Nikaku teacher's dressing room scenery	11

D Block

Rank	Order	Name	Office affiliation	Performance	Score
1st	2nd	Nakagawake	Yoshimoto Creative Agency	Hatarakuotonatachi	48
2nd	3rd	Hiroiki Ariyoshi	Ōta Production	Shō Aikawa's graduation speech	27
3rd	1st	Satoshi Onoma and Twotone Aoki	Sugar Music and Prosper	class performing "Natsu no Hi no 1993"	25

E Block

Rank	Order	Name	Office affiliation	Performance	Score
1st	1st	Croket	Mad Carfield	Robot Hiroshi Itsuki	53
2nd	3rd	Kōji Tomita	Top Color	Tsutomu Sekine's impression analysis	37
3rd	2nd	Chōshin Juku	Watanabe Entertainment	Rock 'n roll impressions	10

F Block

Rank	Order	Name	Office affiliation	Performance	Score
1st	3rd	Hori	Horipro	Celebrity look-alike	62
2nd	2nd	Upgirls	Watanabe Entertainment	Joyman impression	24
3rd	1st	Hōsei Yamasaki	Yoshimoto Creative Agency	Shōgo Hamada performing "Ai to Iuna no Motoni"	14

G Block

Rank	Order	Nami	Office Affiliation	Performance	Score
1st	2nd	Kōichi Yamadera	Across Entertainment	Scatman John performing "Pripri Scat"	47
2nd	3rd	Ijiri Okada	Horipro	Geinōkai no Nandetarō	35
3rd	1st	The Newspaper	TNP Company	Shōichi Nakagawa's press conference	18

H Block

Rank	Order	Name	Office affiliation	Performance	Score
1st	3rd	Yuki Nishio	Shinei Production	Mika Nakashima performing "Orion"	64
2nd	1st	Makita Sports	Office Kitano	Eikichi Yazawa legend episode	26
3rd	2nd	The Touch	Horipro	Matsuko Deluxe	10

=== Semi-finals ===
A Block

Rank	Order	Name	Performance	Score
1st	3rd	Kōji Tomita	Tsurube Shōfukutei rakugo impression	50
2nd	1st	Kannazuki	TVXQ performing "Purple Line"	28
3rd	2nd	Takashi Kanemitsu	Dragon Ball impressions	22

B Block

Rank	Order	Name	Performance	Score
1st	2nd	Nakagawake	Legend of comedy group B&B	53
2nd	1st	Akimasa Haraguchi	Junji Inagawa impression	47

C Block

Rank	Order	Name	Performance	Score
1st	2nd	Hori	Mote utana no ni mote nai DE Show	67
2nd	1st	Croket	Naotarō Moriyama video impression	33

D Block

Rank	Order	Name	Performance	Score
1st	1st	Kōichi Yamadera	Yūsaku Kimura performing "home"	61
2nd	2nd	Yuki Nishio	Hikaru Utada performing "Prisoner of Love"	39

=== Finals ===
Rank	Order	Name	Performance	Score
1st	2nd	Nakagawake	Maikuyo Kuruyo	34
2nd	4th	Kōichi Yamadera	Louis Armstrong performing "When the Saints Go Marching In"	31
3rd	3rd	Hori	Various celebrities reading Momotarō	26
4th	1st	Kōji Tomita	Toshiyuki Nishida's wedding speech	9

== Related programs ==
- Tamori no Sekai Sokkuri Taishō
- Shijō Saiko Sokkuri Taishō
- Bakushō Sokkuri Monomane Kōhaku Utagassen Special (Fuji Television)
- The Monomane (TBS TV)
