= Ohta Production =

Japanese talent agency

Ohta Production Inc.
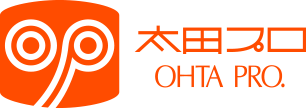

- Headquarters in Shinjuku, Tokyo
- Native name: 株式会社太田プロダクション
- Romanized name: Kabushiki-gaisha Ōta Purodakushon
- Type: Private KK
- Industry: Service industry (entertainment)
- Genre: Tarento, actor, comedian, athlete entertainment industry management and production etc.
- Founded: July 8, 1963; 63 years ago
- Founder: Tsutomu Isono
- Headquarters: Frontier Yotsuya 2nd Floor, Yotsuya, Shinjuku, Tokyo, Japan
- Area served: Japan
- Key people: Dai Isono (Representative director and president); Yasuko Isono (vice-president)
- Number of employees: 50
- Subsidiaries: Ohta Publishing
- Website: www.ohtapro.co.jp

Ohta Production Inc. (株式会社太田プロダクション, Kabushiki-gaisha Ōta Purodakushon), sometimes shortened to Ohta Pro (太田プロ, Ōta Puro), is a Japanese talent agency headquartered in Yotsuya, Shinjuku, Tokyo. It was founded in 1963 and focuses on talent management for actors, athletes, comedians and tarento. The agency have produced numerous television personalities in the entertainment industry.

== Notable talents ==
Obtained from official website.

=== Comedians ===
- Aka Plu
- Alco and Peace (Kenta Sakai, Yuki Hirako)
- Hiroiki Ariyoshi
- Dacho Club (Katsuhiro Higo, Jimon Terakado, Ryuhei Ueshima)
- Gekidan Hitori
- Kannazuki
- Kunihiro Matsumura
- Miyashita Kusanagi (Koki Kusanagi, Kensho Miyashita)
- Time Machine 3go (Koji Yamamoto, Futoshi Seki)
- Teruyuki Tsuchida
- Kanako Yanagihara

=== Actors ===
- Emiri Henmi
- Tsurutaro Kataoka
- Naoki Kunishima
- Tatsuya Nōmi
- Keiko Saito
- Mai Sekiguchi
- Gaku Shindo
- Reiko Takashima
- Takeshi Tsuruno
- Kohei Yamamoto

=== Idols ===
- Anna Iriyama (former AKB48)
- Erika Ikuta (former Nogizaka46)
- Rie Kitahara (former NGT48 + AKB48)
- Rika Nakai (former NGT48)
- Kayo Noro (former AKB48 + SDN48)
- Yuko Oshima (former AKB48)
- Rino Sashihara (former HKT48 + AKB48)
- Yui Yokoyama (former AKB48)
- Miu Shitao (AKB48)

=== Athletes ===
- Yoko Gushiken (former boxer)
- Takanori Hatakeyama (former boxer)
- Toshiaki Kawada (former wrestler)
- Shinji Takehara (former boxer)
- Katsuo Tokashiki (former boxer)

=== Other tarento ===
- Shinnosuke Furumoto (voice actor)
- Kansai Yamamoto (fashion designer)

== Notable former talents ==
- Bakushō Mondai (Yuji Tanaka, Hikari Ōta) (comedy duo)
- Egashira 2:50 (comedian)
- Kenji Haga (actor, businessman)
- Toshihito Ito (actor)
- Carolyn Kawasaki (model)
- Naomi Kawashima (actress)
- Hiroko Kurumizawa (singer)
- Neptune (Taizo Harada, Ken Horiuchi, Jun Nagura) (comedy trio)
- Mari Okamoto (comedian)
- Bibiru Ōki (comedian)
- Erena Ono (former AKB48)
- Shun Sugata (actor)
- Beat Takeshi (comedian, actor, director) – and all others from Office Kitano
- Atsuko Maeda (former AKB48)
- Saya Kamitani (professional wrestler)
