= Hikari Ota's If I Were Prime Minister... Secretary Tanaka =

Japanese television series

Prime Minister Ōta

Hikari Ōta's If I Were Prime Minister of Japan... Secretary Tanaka (太田光の私が総理大臣になったら…秘書田中。, Ōta Hikari no Watashi ga Sōridaijin ni Nattara... Hisho Tanaka) is a regular debate variety show broadcast on Japan's Nippon TV. The show, starring the owarai duo Bakushō Mondai started out as a special presentation on October 15, 2005, and has been broadcast during prime-time on Fridays since April 7, 2006. Due to the extremely long title, the show is usually referred to as Prime Minister Ōta (太田総理, Ōta Sōri).

== The setup ==
Hikari Ōta, who is a comedian, usually takes the position of Prime Minister, and puts forth to the assembled guests a manifesto, generally of a very radical, sometimes even ridiculous nature. In the video introduction that follows, Ōta's manifesto is explained, and a brief (and humorous) proof is given for how this particular manifesto will bring peace to Japan, and/or the world. The guests are then divided into those who propose and oppose the manifesto, and debating starts with an introduction by the "Prime Minister". The discussions, though generally civil, can often produce high tensions between debaters, even those arguing on the same side, and Speaker Fumi Mori (who is actually an announcer for Nippon TV), sitting above the assembly, often exercises her power to halt discussion and gives individuals a chance to speak freely.

Hikari Ōta's partner in comedy Yūji Tanaka, acting secretary, doesn't participate in discussions and instead spends the entire show in the "Prime Minister's office" with Eriko Kumazawa (acting second secretary, though she is a model) eating foods given as gifts from the other guests and generally laughing whenever the debating gets hot. There is also a bench for "neutral" participants in the discussion, but guests who choose not to take sides are not often given a chance to speak.

At the end of the debate (always announced by the Speaker, usually before any form of consensus is made) guests must give their final decision (to approve or reject the manifesto) to the Speaker. Manifestos that are approved by the assembly are proposed to the National Diet of Japan.

== The "manifestos" ==
With Ōta (and occasionally a guest) as Prime Minister, the subject matter of the show varies widely from that of typical Japanese political debate shows. Whether Ōta actually believes what he proposes or not is debatable (he is known to take the opposing side of an argument for the sake of arguing), many of his manifestos are quite extreme, and the majority of his manifestos are not approved by the assembly. That being said, many of his manifestos deal with extremely important and difficult national and international issues, and though the tone of the show may be light with jokes and taunts being thrown around without consequence, the discussions are often very serious, and tears and lost tempers are not rare.

A few notable manifestos that have been approved (and thus sent to the Diet) are:

- Remove all support for NEET individuals (PM: Ōta)
- Make a statement in the constitution stating that psychic phenomena do not exist (PM: Ōta)
- Remove the salary of members of the official opposing political party (PM: Ōta)
- Make the days of Japan's World Cup matches into national holidays (PM: Various)
- Require doctors to take a license renewal test every 5 years (PM: Etsuko Namikawa, actress)

A few notable manifestos that have been rejected are:

- Write history textbooks in cooperation with other east Asian countries, as done in France and Germany (PM: Ōta)
- Privatize the government of prefectures and cities (PM: Ōta)
- Charge ¥100 for each character of input on the internet (PM: Ōta)
- In the future, refuse to give any money to the US government (PM: Ōta)
- Force homeowners to open their curtains during the afternoon (PM: Tōru Hashimoto, Lawyer - later became Osaka city mayor)

== The guests ==
Ōta is known for his debating skills, and so as not to be strong-armed. It is an assembly of well-known guests from various walks of life who are featured as regulars on the show. About a third of the guests are usually members (occasionally leaders) of major Japanese political parties, and the rest are usually a mix of famous tarento and prominent foreign personalities. While some of the regulars and guests are also debaters, many (especially some of the tarento) do not tend to participate much in the heated talks. Quieter participants may be given a minute to speak their opinion in between major points of a discussion, and their opinions often help to keep the discussions focused.

The show's regulars are:

- Katsuei Hirasawa (平沢勝栄), LDP member
- Hideaki Ōmura (大村秀章), LDP member
- Akira Amari (甘利明), LDP member
- Kazuhiro Haraguchi (原口一博), DPJ member, often supports Ōta
- Yoshizumi Ishihara (石原良純), actor, tarento, and weatherman
- Lasa-R Ishii (ラサール石井), comedian and actor
- Kevin Clone, American-born Japanese international columnist, usually opposes Ōta and has an extremely strong debating style
- Saya Kazuki (和希沙也), idol
- George Takahashi (高橋ジョージ), rock vocalist, often supports Ōta
- Hirotada Ototake (乙武洋匡), sports writer
- Akiko Matsumoto (松本明子), tarento and actress
- Kazuyo Matsui (松居一代), tarento, actress, and essayist
- Pa-kkun Ma-kkun (パックンマックン), Japanese and American comedy duo

In total, the show usually features more than 30 guests. The narrator of the show is Kiyoshi Kobayashi (小林清志).

== Reaction ==
Though political discussion is not rare on Japanese television, direct political satire is almost non-existent, and Ōta himself has expressed worries about the future of the show in an interview with New York Times editor Norimitsu Onishi,

I want to say what I want to say [...] But I have to think about the possibility of inflicting damage on people who are involved in the production of this program, or making their work difficult, or of having our office staff attacked. So I try to avoid causing these things. I have to finesse it somehow.

Ōta reportedly will not touch upon certain topics, namely the imperial family and North Korea, because of the complex nature of the issues and a general lack of public understanding. Regardless, Ōta doesn't appear to be backing down as he says,

Even though I'm doing this kind of show, some say politics is not an area that comedians should step into [...] But I wouldn’t say that. Comedians should even make fun of politics.
