= Mari Okamoto (impressionist) =

Japanese entertainer and impressionist (born 1989)

- おかもと まり
- Born: December 13, 1989 (age 36); Fujioka, Gunma, Japan
- Education: Showa Women's University Junior College
- Occupation: Entertainer
- Years active: 2006 - 2018
- Agents: Union Production; Ohta Production; Twin Planet
- Height: 1.56 m (5 ft 1 in)
- Spouses: nao (m. 2015–2018) Daisuke Yogi (m. 2023; div. 2024)
- Children: 1
- Website: Official profile

Mari Okamoto (おかもと まり, Okamoto Mari; born December 13, 1989 in Fujioka, Gunma, Japan) is a Japanese entertainer and impressionist who is previously represented by Ohta Production.

== Impressions ==
- Suzanne
- Akemi Matsuno
- Ryōko Hirosue
- Juri Ueno
- Nana Suzuki
- Serina
- Shoko Haida
- Aya Hirano
- Akina Minami
- Momoko Tsugunaga (Berryz Kobo)

== Filmography ==
=== Drama ===
Year	Title	Role	Network	Notes
	Operation Love	Classmate	Fuji TV	
	Toranaide Kudasai!! Gravure Idol Ura Monogatari	Mari Okamoto	TV Tokyo	
2012	Chō Rekishi Roman Kanzen Ketchaku SP	Natsubone Yajima	TV Tokyo	

=== Variety series ===
Year	Title	Network	Notes
	Sakurazuka Yankees	TV Saitama	Reporter
2009	Himekuri Time Travel	NHK-BS2	
2009	Waratte Iitomo!	Fuji TV	
2009	BS Brunch	BS-TBS	
2009	Tokudane!	Fuji TV	
2009	Hikari Ota's If I Were Prime Minister... Secretary Tanaka	NTV	
2010	Koji Imada Presents Tsurube vs. Michisū Geinin Ore no Aikata Dareya Nen!? Special	KTV	
2010	Bananaman's Blog Deka	THK	
2010	Pu tsu Sma	TV Asahi	
2010	Shibuya Deep A	NHK-BS2	
2010	Vs. Arashi	Fuji TV	
2010	Monomane Grand Prix	NTV	
2010	1230 Atto!! Hamarancho	TVK	
2010	Onegai! Ranking	TV Asahi	
2010	Ueda Channel	TV Asahi	
2010	Fuji San	Fuji TV	
2010	Gintamaō	Sun TV	
2010	TokYo, Boy	Tokyo MX	
2010	Nabe Achitsu!	Fuji TV	
2010	Lion no Gokigenyō	Fuji TV	
2010	Supamoku!!	TBS	
2010	Nep League	Fuji TV	
2010	Yoikobu	MBS	
2010	Koisuru TV Sugo Kyun	Fuji TV	
2010	Hey! Hey! Hey! Music Champ	Fuji TV	
2010	Maesetsuō	TV Asahi	
2010	Exit	NTV	
2010	Sōdatta no ka! Akira Ikegami no Manaberu News	TV Asahi	
2010	Pekepon	Fuji TV	
2010	Sakiyomi Jum-Bang!	TV Tokyo	
2010	Ken Shimura no Baka Tonosama	Fuji TV	
2010	Pical no Teiri	Fuji TV	Regular
2010	Q-sama!!	TV Asahi	
2010	London Hearts	TV Asahi	
2011	Cha$e	Fuji TV	
2011	You Knock on a Jumping Door!	Fuji TV	
2011	Ken Shimura no Daijōbu Daa	Fuji TV	
2011	Oh! Doyakao Summit	ABC	
2011	Oha Suta	TV Tokyo	
2011	Otakara Hasshin Tower Dai-namo	CBC	
2011	1-nen 1-kumi Heisei Kyōiku Gakuin	Fuji TV	
2011	Tobidase! Kagaku-kun	TBS	
2011	Shirokuro Unjash	CTV	
2011	Satanepu Best Ten	TBS	
2011	Nekketsu Bo-so TV	CTV	
2012	Shigoto Hakken-den	NHK G	
2012	Kurashi no Suppli! Shūgō! Sanshimai: Girl's Adventure	BS Asahi	
2012	Mame Sata	SUT	Quasi-regular
2012	Cozy Tomita no Mono Pachi JPN!!	TVK	
2012	Uchikuru!?	Fuji TV	
2012	Wagamama! Kimama! Tabi Kibun	TSS	
2012	Sumaho Police	TV Asahi	
2013	Happy End	TBS	
2013	Ressha ni Notte	RKB	
2013	Akimasa Haraguchi no Ima ga Pachi Doki tsu!	Tokyo MX	
2013	Mikatsu Sanshimai: Kurashi no Suppli	BS Asahi	
2013	FNS27-jikan TV	Fuji TV	
2013	Kita Special	NHK	
2013	TV Shakai Jikken Asunaro Lab	Fuji TV	
2013	Yumemiru Kin Baku!	OTV	
2014	Sekainohate no Nihonjin!: Koko ga Watashi no Risōkyō	TBS	
2014	Pool de Blog	TV Asahi	
2014	Osekkyō Idol Shikaru Genji	ABC	
2014	Non Stop!	Fuji TV	
2014	Arigato!	TVK	
2014	Cunning no Dai-yasu Kichijitsu!	BS Fuji	
2014	Otona e no Tobira TV	NHK E	
2015	Metlog	TBS	
2015	Shikujiri Sensei Ore Mitai ni Naru na!!	TV Asahi	

=== Radio series ===
Year	Title	Network	Notes
2010	Hiroiki Ariyoshi no Sunday Night Dreamer	JFN	
2010	Suntory Saturday Waiting Bar	JFN	
2012	Yūkan Atsukī!	CBC Radio	
2012	Campus Yose	NHK Radio	
2012	Gocha Maze Tsu! Nichiyōbi	MBS Radio	
2013	Gocha Maze Tsu! Getsuyōbi	MBS Radio	
2014	Ryuta Mine no Minesuta	Radio Japan	
2014	Hamidashi Shabekuri Radio Kicks	YBS	
2015	Konya mo Otopara!	NBS	

=== Films ===
Year	Title	Role	Notes
2009	Boku no Hatsukoi o Kimi ni Sasagu	High school student	
2011	Hanako-san	Aya Yoshioka	Directo-to-video
2012	Ghost Writer Hotel	Fumiko Hayashi	

=== Advertisements ===
Year	Title	Notes
2011	Tokyo Summerland	

=== Other ===
Year	Title	Notes
	The Inazuma Sentai "Aa!! Saredo Seishun-gokko"	
	Deep "Sora: Kono-goe ga Todoku Made"	
2011	Zoku Kotodama no Onna-tachi	
2011	Beagle Crew "Wedding Park Presents Happy Wedding Songs!"	
2011	My First Big Meitantei Konan Kegareta Hero	Jacket photo model
2012	9-kai de Zettai Yaseru! Neko Nobi Diet	
2014	Toshinori Mori-shiki Jichō Training	
	Karaoke World Championsjip 2014	
	Onsen de Hon wa ka Iyasa re Joshijikara Up!	
