= Survivor (Japanese TV series) =

- Created by: Charlie Parsons
- Presented by: Neptune, Munehiro Tokita
- Country of origin: Japan
- Original languages: English; Japanese
- No. of seasons: 4
- No. of episodes: 39

Original release
- Network: TBS
- Release: April 9, 2002 – March 11, 2003

Related
- Expedition Robinson; Survivor (American TV series)

Survivor (サバイバー, Sabaibā) is a Japanese reality game show based on the popular international Survivor format. The show broadcast on the Tokyo Broadcasting System on Tuesdays. Its hosts were Neptune as 'Presenter', and Munehiro Tokita, a voice actor, as 'Guide Staff'. Four seasons were broadcast from April 2002 to March 2003. As of December 2019, the Tokyo Broadcasting System has not yet announced plans for a fifth season.

The prize for Sole Survivors was 10,000,000 yen.

== Format & Rules ==
The show follows the same general format as the other editions of the show. 16 castaways are split between two teams and are taken to a remote isolated location and are forced to live off the land with meager supplies for 39 days. Frequent physical and mental challenges are used to pit the teams against each other for rewards, such as food or luxuries, or for "immunity", forcing the other tribe to attend "Tribal Council", where they must vote off one of their players.

Once about half the players are remaining, the tribes are merged into a single tribe, and competitions are on an individual basis; winning immunity prevents that player from being voted out. Most players that are voted out at this stage form the "Tribal Council Jury". Once down to two people, a final Tribal Council is held where the remaining players plead their case to the Jury as to why they should win the game. The jury then votes for which player should be considered the "Sole Survivor" and be awarded the grand prize of 10,000,000 yen.

== Seasons ==
List of Survivor Japan seasons
No.	Season	Season premiere	Season finale	Location	Initial Tribes	Winner	Runner up	Final vote
1	Survivor Japan: Palau	9 April 2002	18 June 2002	Ngemelis Islands, Palau	Two tribes of eight	Eri Minoshima	Daisuke Yoshino	5-0
2	Survivor Japan: Hokkaido	2 July 2002	17 September 2002	Mikasa, Hokkaido, Japan	Two tribes of eight	Asami Kawamura	Sakiko Sekiguchi	6-0
3	Survivor Japan: Philippines	15 October 2002	17 December 2002	Siquijor, Philippines	Two tribes of eight	Yasuhito Ebisawa	Sei Sugawara	4-3
4	Survivor Japan: North Mariana	14 January 2003	11 March 2003	Rita, Northern Mariana Islands	Two tribes of eight	Kōshin Gunji	Atsuko Koizumi	5-2
