= Kamen Rider Kiva: King of the Castle in the Demon World =

- Film poster for both Kamen Rider Kiva: King of the Castle in the Demon World and Engine Sentai Go-onger: Boom Boom! Bang Bang! GekijōBang!!

Japanese name
- Kanji: 劇場版 仮面ライダーキバ 魔界城の王
Transcriptions
- Revised Hepburn: Gekijōban Kamen Raidā Kiba Makaijō no Ō
- Directed by: Ryuta Tasaki
- Written by: Toshiki Inoue
- Based on: Kamen Rider Kiva by Toshiki Inoue
- Produced by: Ishimori Productions; Toei
- Starring: Kōji Seto; Kouhei Takeda; Keisuke Kato; Nana Yanagisawa; Yu Takahashi; Shouma Yamamoto; Ken Horiuchi
- Cinematography: Masao Inokuma
- Edited by: Naoki Osada
- Music by: Tsuneyoshi Saito
- Production company: Toei
- Distributed by: Toei Co. Ltd
- Release date: August 9, 2008
- Running time: 71 minutes; 92 minutes (Director's Cut)
- Country: Japan
- Language: Japanese

Kamen Rider Kiva the Movie: King of the Castle in the Demon World (劇場版 仮面ライダーキバ 魔界城の王, Gekijōban Kamen Raidā Kiba Makaijō no Ō) is the theatrical film adaptation of the Japanese 2008 Kamen Rider series, Kamen Rider Kiva, directed by Ryuta Tasaki and written by Toshiki Inoue. A director's cut came out in June 2009.

The film is produced by Ishimori Productions and Toei, the producers of all the previous television series and films of the Kamen Rider series. Following the tradition of all Heisei Kamen Rider movies, it is a double bill with the movie for 2008's Super Sentai series Engine Sentai Go-onger, Engine Sentai Go-onger: Boom Boom! Bang Bang! GekijōBang!!, both of which premiered on August 9, 2008. The film's title is translated into English as Masked Rider Kiva The Movie: King of the Castle in the Demon World. The double-feature opened at number 4 in Japanese box offices its opening weekend.

== Production ==
King of the Castle in the Demon World features two new Riders, the first of which was shown in silhouette in Japanese children's magazines, Kamen Rider Rey, who is a monster hunter named Takato Shiramine played by Shouma Yamamoto. He is partnered to Rey Kivat, voiced by Norio Wakamoto. The villain of the movie is Takashi Sugimura who is a death-row inmate and transforms into the black and horned Kamen Rider Arc, portrayed by Ken Horiuchi of the comedy troupe Neptune. Arc is to be the tallest Rider without the use of powers at 3.2 m tall. Also guest starring is Gal Sone, who plays a Medusa-like villainess named Sayaka who, among other creatures known as the Legendorga, aids Arc in his quest to rule the world. As part of the role, Gal Sone will show off her competitive eating skills. Toshihiko Seki, Kōji Yusa, Masaki Terasoma, Kenichi Suzumura, Rina Akiyama, and Ryo Ueno of the Den-O cast are all to have cameo appearances in the film.

== Story ==
The story begins in 2008 as the Antlion Fangire begins to feed at an exhibit room until Megumi intervened as Nago arrives to slay the monster. However, during their struggle, the Mummy Legendorga suddenly resurrects and feeds on the humans before using his power to turn the Antlion Fangire into his slave to aid him in overwhelming Nago with the Arms Monsters watching the fight. While this occurred, Wataru Kurenai starts attending a local high school at Shizuka's suggestion after a welfare officer visited him and quickly befriends Natsuki Tsukue, who tries to get Wataru to join several clubs where he fails in each one while trying to ask her if she would like to start a violin club after hearing her play, she refuses out right.

Later that night, death row inmate Takashi Sugimura escaped from prison and the pursuing police officers by means of a dark power possessing him, with Nago going after him under advisement from Mamoru Shima to capture the fugitive with caution as he may be a Fangire. When Nago finds Sugimura, he chases the fugitive all the way to Wataru's high school and takes Natsuki hostage, but she is freed by the joint efforts of Wataru and Nago. However, the Medusa and Mummy Legendorgas appear to Sugimura's aid when he was being escorted back to jail, overpowering Ixa as Kiva arrives. They overpower the riders until another figure named Takato Shiramine appears, transforming into Kamen Rider Rey and driving the two Legendorgas off as they take Sugimura with them, waking him as their Lord.

At the cafe, as Shiramine explains the Legendorgas, Wataru finds that the current crisis started when Sugimura attempted to break out of jail by using the famous violinist Towa Sakakibara as a hostage in 1986 and broke the Legendorgas' seal. With this knowledge, Wataru asks the Arm Monsters permission to use Castle Doran's Time Door to go back in time to prevent Sugimura's actions. While trying to get Sakakibara to cancel her concert, he is stopped by Otoya, who was convinced he was a Fangire and tries to beat him. After another attempt to talk to her, Wataru is attacked by Yuri after Otoya tells her about him as the police arrive to arrest Otoya on the impression he is the criminal. Forced to take Wataru in a stolen police car, Otoya is shocked when Wataru recognized him as his father. Wataru attempts to prove himself with his cellphone and money before he and his father are both sent to Kanto West Prison where Towa is to perform as Sugimura takes her hostage to escape. But Otoya knocks out a guard named Sanjou so he and Wataru can get out of their cell to save Towa and restrain Sugimura.

After Wataru returns to his time under the impression he succeeded, Sanjou turns out to be Zebra Fangire that attacks Otoya before trying to kill Towa. But Yuri arrives to allow Otoya to kill the Fangire as Ixa, causing the chain of events where Sugimura escapes and uncovers the tomb of the Legendorga Lord, invoking the spirit within it. When Wataru returns to his time, he is targeted by people under the control of the Mummy and Medusa Legendorgas, with the Gargolye Legendorga overseeing their attack. Luckily, Otoya and Yuri arrive to aid their future children, later bonding with them before Otoya reveals that Towa Sakakibara is the stage name of Natsumi Tsukue, Natsuki's mother. Otoya is enjoying the present and its perks after disguising Wataru so he wouldn't be attacked, meeting up with Shiramine before he is distracted by a young woman named Sayaka as Shiramine tells Wataru that Kiva's destruction will soon come as Sayaka reveals herself as the Medusa Legendorga.

Becoming Kiva to fight the Legendorgas, he summons Buroon Booster which he uses to destroys the Mandrake Legendorga as the Arm Monsters arrive to aid Kiva in fighting the remaining three in both their true forms and in their weapon forms. However, as his friends drive the monsters off, Kiva is attacked by Rey who reveals that he is on the Legendorgas' side as he then takes the Aso girls hostage. Later at the cafe, after Otoya plays Natsumi's song to help Natsuki finally accept her mother, Rey-kivat arrives with orders to take Wataru to the Legendorgas' castle. After knocking his father out, Wataru arrives at the castle and is brought before Sugimura, who reveals himself to be the vessel of the Legendorga Lord Arc who was defeated by the original Kiva and uses his power to force Wataru's Fangire blood to manifest into Kiva's Flight Style. Under Arc's control, Wataru is forced to have Otoya relinquish his Ixa Knuckle as Nago arrives to help. But once he loses his Ixa Knuckle, Yuri and Megumi arrive after freeing themselves and use their time-respective Ixa Knuckles to fight the Legendorgas with Otoya managing to snap his son out of Arc's spell as the Aso girls kill the Medusa Legendorga.

Enraged, Sugimura decides to kill Wataru as they both assume their Rider Forms as the Ixa Knuckles are returned to Otoya and Nago who fight the Mummy Legendorga and Rey, respectively. Nago eventually gets the best of Rey, destroying him with the Ixa Judgement, while Otoya eventually destroys the Mummy Legendorga, even though his Save Mode helmet is heavily damaged in the process. While this occurred, Kiva is forced to assume Emperor Form to deal with the larger opponent, weakening him enough so he can be defeated by both of the Kurenai family Riders. However, Arc absorbs the power of the Legendorga race by sucking the eye on the moon into himself to become Legend Arc to kill them. Kiva then transforms into Emperor Form's Flight Style to fight Legend Arc in a battle across the city, until Castle Doran comes to Kiva's aid, finally allowing Kiva to perform a Rider Kick with enough force to slam Arc into the moon, leaving a gigantic crater and destroying him for good. After everything returns to normal, Otoya performs alongside his son on their violins at Wataru's school before he and Yuri return to their time. Once they left, Wataru is joined by Natsuki as the two perform a duet.

== Characters ==
=== Movie-exclusive characters ===
- Natsuki Tsukue (机 なつき, Tsukue Natsuki): Wataru's classmate in a high school.
- Towa Sakakibara (Natsumi Tsukue) (榊原 とわ（机 なつみ）, Sakakibara Towa (Tsukue Natsumi)): Natsuki's mother, a violinist who studies under Otoya in 1986.

=== Movie-exclusive Kamen Riders ===
==== Kamen Rider Rey ====
Takato Shiramine (白峰 天斗, Shiramine Takato) is an aloof loner of the 3WA (World Wide Wing Association) (3WA（ワールド・ワイド・ウィング・アソシエーション）, Wārudo Waido Wingu Asoshiēshon). With the assistance of Rey Kivat (レイキバット, Rei Kibatto), an intelligent computer created by the 3WA, he can transform into Kamen Rider Rey (仮面ライダーレイ, Kamen Raidā Rei) and is armed with the Gigantic Claw (ギガンティック・クロー, Gigantikku Kurō) which are unleashed with the Key Fuestle (キーフエッスル, Kī Fuessuru). With the Gigantic Claw, he can perform the Blizzard Claw Execution (ブリザードクロー・エクスキュージョン, Burizādo Kurō Ekusukyūjon) with the destructive power of 28t. The Blowning Shoulders (ブロウニングショルダー, Burōningu Shorudā) are with the grip of 9t, and the claw can be utilized as a spear. The 3WA researched the Demon Races, and developed the Rey System from researching Kiva. But since normal humans can't use it, Shiramine had himself baptized by the Legendorgas in order to be able to use the system. Shiramine rides his own white Honda DN-01 motorcycle. Rey's name comes from a Japanese word for "cold" (冷, rei).

==== Kamen Rider Arc ====
Takashi Sugimura (杉村 隆, Sugimura Takashi) is a death row inmate of the Kato West Prison (関東西刑務所, Katō Nishi Keimusho) in the year 1986, who becomes the host of the original Arc, whose original body was destroyed by the very first Kiva before his soul is sealed within a stone coffin enshrined in the prison that Sugimura broke while attempting his escape in 1986. As a result of being possessed, Sugimura remained youthful and unable to die after being executed before he made his escape in present-day before being taken by the Legendorga. Once taking full control over Sugimura's body, proceeds to get his revenge by killing the current Kiva. With the assistance of the mechanical monster Arc Kivat (アークキバット, Āku Kibatto), he can transform into Kamen Rider Arc (仮面ライダーアーク, Kamen Raidā Āku), the King of the Castle in the Demon World. As Arc, he wields the 4m long Arc Trident (アークトライデント, Āku Toraidento) and is the largest Kamen Rider to date at 3.2m tall (unless you count Kamen Rider J's jumbo formation). He can shoot a light bullet from the forehead. Through the use of the Wake Up Fuestle (which resembles Rey's Key Fuestle in the movie), Arc transforms into Legend Arc (レジェンドアーク, Rejendo Āku) by assimulating the demon-eye of the moon to obtain the full power of his race, growing wings and a second set of arms. In the process, Arc Kivat assumes Mecha Kivat (メカキバット, Meka Kibatto) mode as his persona cast comes off and yells, "Go to Hell." As Legend Arc, he can open up the giant mouth/eye in his chest known as the Dead Crusher (デッドクラッシャー, Deddo Kurasshā) and create the Ultima Black Hole (ウルティマブラックホール, Urutima Burakku Hōru) to perform the Ultima Dead End (ウルティマデッドエンド, Urutima Deddo Endo) finisher with the destructive power of 120t. Arc's name comes from a Japanese word for "evil" (悪, aku).

=== Legendorga ===
The Legendorga (レジェンドルガ, Rejendoruga) are the monsters of King of the Castle in the Demon World who serve the Legendorga Lord Arc in his attempt to take over the world. But their plan failed because of Fangire Race and the first Kiva who destroyed Arc's original body. But once their master's spirit is released into a new body in 1986, the Legendorga are revived in present-day to take their revenge on the current Kiva. One of the thirteen Demon Races (魔族, Mazoku) that also are composed of the Human, Kivat, Fangire, Wolfen, Merman, Franken, Doran, and Sagarc Races, the Legendorga all themed after legendary creatures and can convert other Demon Races into their kind. There are four servant Legendorga appearing in the film:

- Mummy Legendorga (マミーレジェンドルガ, Mamī Rejendoruga): Revived from the big fossil that was part of the Great Ancient Exhibition 08' (大古代展08', Dai Kodaiten Zero Hachi), the Mummy Legendorga is the leader of the Legendorga under Arc. The Mummy Legendorga is able to use his wraps to bind opponents. He can control an opponent using the Control Death Mask (コントロールデスマスク, Kontorōru Desu Masuku), the attack also serving as a means to feed on human victims. He is also able to enslave humans en masse with the aid of the demon-eye of the moon. He was destroyed by Otoya using the Ixa System.
- Medusa Legendorga (メドゥーサレジェンドルガ, Medūsa Rejendoruga): A Legendorga who assumes the human form named Sayaka (サヤカ). Armed with a gun and able to use the snakes on her head as weapons, also able to enslave humans like the Mummy Legendorga. She was destroyed by Yuri and Megumi using both Ixa Systems on her while she was blinded by Wataru free of her master's baptism.
- Mandrake Legendorga (マンドレイクレジェンドルガ, Mandoreiku Rejendoruga): Able to turn any surface area to foliage, transforming any area into territory more suitable to him. Able to move faster and more agile in a plant-controlled environment, this ability was unable to keep him from being destroyed by a direct impact from Buroon Booster.
- Gargoyle Legendorga (ガーゴイルレジェンドルガ, Gāgoiru Rejendoruga): He battles Megumi in the Ixa gear as Rey arrives and freezes their legs so he could kill the girl with the Legendorga destroyed in the process. Furious at being used, the Gargoyle Legendorga tries to kill Rey only to die at his hand.

== Internet spin-off film ==
On June 2, 2008, Toei announced on its various official websites that there would be a series of short five-minute internet movies that are spin-offs of both King of the Castle in the Demon World and Boom Boom! Bang Bang! GekijōBang!! to be accessed by a mobile phone service. In the case of King of the Castle in the Demon World, the featurettes are called Net Edition: Kamen Rider Backwards-Kiva: Queen of the Castle in the Demon World (ネット版 仮面ライダー裏キバ 魔界城の女王, Nettoban Kamen Raidā Urakiba Makaijō no Joō), the first webisode released on July 11, 2008. In these shorts, Otoya and Yuri are brought into the present by Castle Doran when the mysterious Queen of the Legendorga is about to be revived. The shorts themselves are all zany misadventures of everyone in the Kiva cast. In the end, the Legendorga Queen is revealed to be Shizuka, however in the battle's climax, it is revealed that the entire event was only a dream.

=== Webisodes ===
1. Wataru Kurenai's Backwards Face?! (紅渡の裏の顔?!, Kurenai Wataru no Ura no Kao?!)
2. Castle Doran Backwards Battle?! (キャッスルドランで裏バトル?!, Kyassuru Doran de Ura Batoru?!)
3. Keisuke Nago's Backwards Face?! (名護啓介の裏の顔?!, Nago Keisuke no Ura no Kao?!)
4. Café Otoya d'amour (カフェ・音也・ダムール♥, Kafe Otoya Damūru)
5. The Queen Descends! (女王降臨!, Joō Kōrin!)

== Cast ==
- Wataru Kurenai (紅 渡, Kurenai Wataru): Kōji Seto (瀬戸 康史, Seto Kōji)
- Otoya Kurenai (紅 音也, Kurenai Otoya): Kouhei Takeda (武田 航平, Takeda Kōhei)
- Keisuke Nago (名護 啓介, Nago Keisuke): Keisuke Kato (加藤 慶祐, Katō Keisuke)
- Megumi Aso (麻生 恵, Asō Megumi): Nana Yanagisawa (柳沢 なな, Yanagisawa Nana)
- Yuri Aso (麻生 ゆり, Asō Yuri): Yu Takahashi (高橋 優, Takahashi Yū)
- Kengo Eritate (襟立 健吾, Eritate Kengo): Kohei Kumai (熊井 幸平, Kumai Kōhei)
- Shizuka Nomura (野村 静香, Nomura Shizuka): Rina Koike (小池 里奈, Koike Rina)
- Jiro (次狼, Jirō): Kenji Matsuda (松田 賢二, Matsuda Kenji)
- Ramon (ラモン): Yuuki Ogoe (小越 勇輝, Ogoe Yūki)
- Riki (力): Eiji Takigawa (滝川 栄治, Takigawa Eiji)
- Akira Kido (木戸 明, Kido Akira): Houka Kinoshita (木下 ほうか, Kinoshita Hōka)
- Mamoru Shima (嶋 護, Shima Mamoru): Kazuhiko Kanayama (金山 一彦, Kanayama Kazuhiko)
- Takato Shiramine (白峰 天斗, Shiramine Takato): Shouma Yamamoto (山本 匠馬, Yamamoto Shōma)
- Natsuki Tsukue (机 なつき, Tsukue Natsuki): Rei Okamoto (岡本 玲, Okamoto Rei)
- Towa Sakakibara (Natsumi Tsukue) (榊原 とわ（机 なつみ）, Sakakibara Towa (Tsukue Natsumi)): Sayuri Anzu (杏 さゆり, Anzu Sayuri)
- Sayaka (サヤカ): Gal Sone (ギャル曽根, Gyaru Sone)
- Takashi Sugimura (杉村 隆, Sugimura Takashi): Ken Horiuchi (堀内 健, Horiuchi Ken) of Neptune
- Prison Officer Sanjō (三条刑務官, Sanjō Keimukan): Toshihiko Seki (関 俊彦, Seki Toshihiko; Cameo)
- Member of Shogi Club (将棋部員, Shōgi Buin): Kōji Yusa (遊佐 浩二, Yusa Kōji; Cameo)
- Teacher (教師, Kyōshi): Masaki Terasoma (てらそま まさき, Terasoma Masaki; Cameo)
- Member of Soccer Club (サッカー部員, Sakkā Buin): Kenichi Suzumura (鈴村 健一, Suzumura Ken'ichi; Cameo)
- Policewoman (婦人警官, Fujin Keikan): Rina Akiyama (秋山 莉奈, Akiyama Rina; Cameo)
- Police Officer (警官, Keikan): Ryo Ueno (上野 亮, Ueno Ryō; Cameo)
- Prison Officer (刑務官, Keimukan): Yoshifumi Oshikawa (押川 善文, Oshikawa Yoshifumi; Cameo)
- Kivat-bat the 3rd (キバットバットIII世, Kibattobatto Sansei; Voice): Tomokazu Sugita (杉田 智和, Sugita Tomokazu)
- Tatsulot (タツロット, Tatsurotto; Voice): Akira Ishida (石田 彰, Ishida Akira)
- Rey Kivat (レイキバット, Rei Kibatto; Voice), Arc Kivat (アークキバット, Āku Kibatto; Voice): : Norio Wakamoto (若本 規夫, Wakamoto Norio)
- Mummy Legendorga (マミーレジェンドルガ, Mamī Rejendoruga; Voice): Tōru Ōkawa (大川 透, Ōkawa Tōru)
- Medusa Legendorga (メドゥーサレジェンドルガ, Medūsa Rejendoruga; Voice): Emi Shinohara (篠原 恵美, Shinohara Emi)
- Gargoyle Legendorga (ガーゴイルレジェンドルガ, Gāgoiru Rejendoruga; Voice): Yoshinori Fujita (藤田 圭宣, Fujita Yoshinori)
- Mandrake Legendorga (マンドレイクレジェンドルガ, Mandoreiku Rejendoruga; Voice): Katsumi Shiono (塩野 勝美, Shiono Katsumi)

== Songs ==
Theme song

- "Circle of Life"
  - Lyrics: Shoko Fujibayashi
  - Composition: Tsuneyoshi Saito, Shuhei Naruse
  - Arrangement: Shuhei Naruse
  - Artist: Crimson-FANG
    - Vocals: Nanase Aikawa
    - Lead Guitar: Marty Friedman
  "Circle of Life" is Nanase Aikawa's first new release since giving birth to her second son in 2007. Crimson-FANG consists of Aikawa on vocals, Marty Friedman on lead guitar, and members of the Kamen Rider Kiva cast on chorus. The single was released as two different versions: "Circle of Life 1986ver." and "Circle of Life 2008ver." Both singles have the title track "Circle of Life" and both a "Violin Re-Connection Ver." (featuring a violin duet from the film) and instrumental of the title track. The "2008ver." single has a song titled "With You" with Koji Seto as Wataru Kurenai performing with Crimson-FANG and its instrumental whereas the "1986ver." single has a song titled "With Me" with Kouhei Takeda as Otoya Kurenai performing with Crimson-FANG and its instrumental. The cover art also differs, with Kiva (Kiva Form) on the cover of the "2008ver." single and Ixa (Save Mode) on the cover of the "1986ver." single. The single debuted at #17 on the Oricon Daily Rankings charts and a debut at #32 on the Weekly Rankings.
