= Gokuraku Tombo =

Japanese comedy duo

- Gokuraku Tonbo (極楽とんぼ)
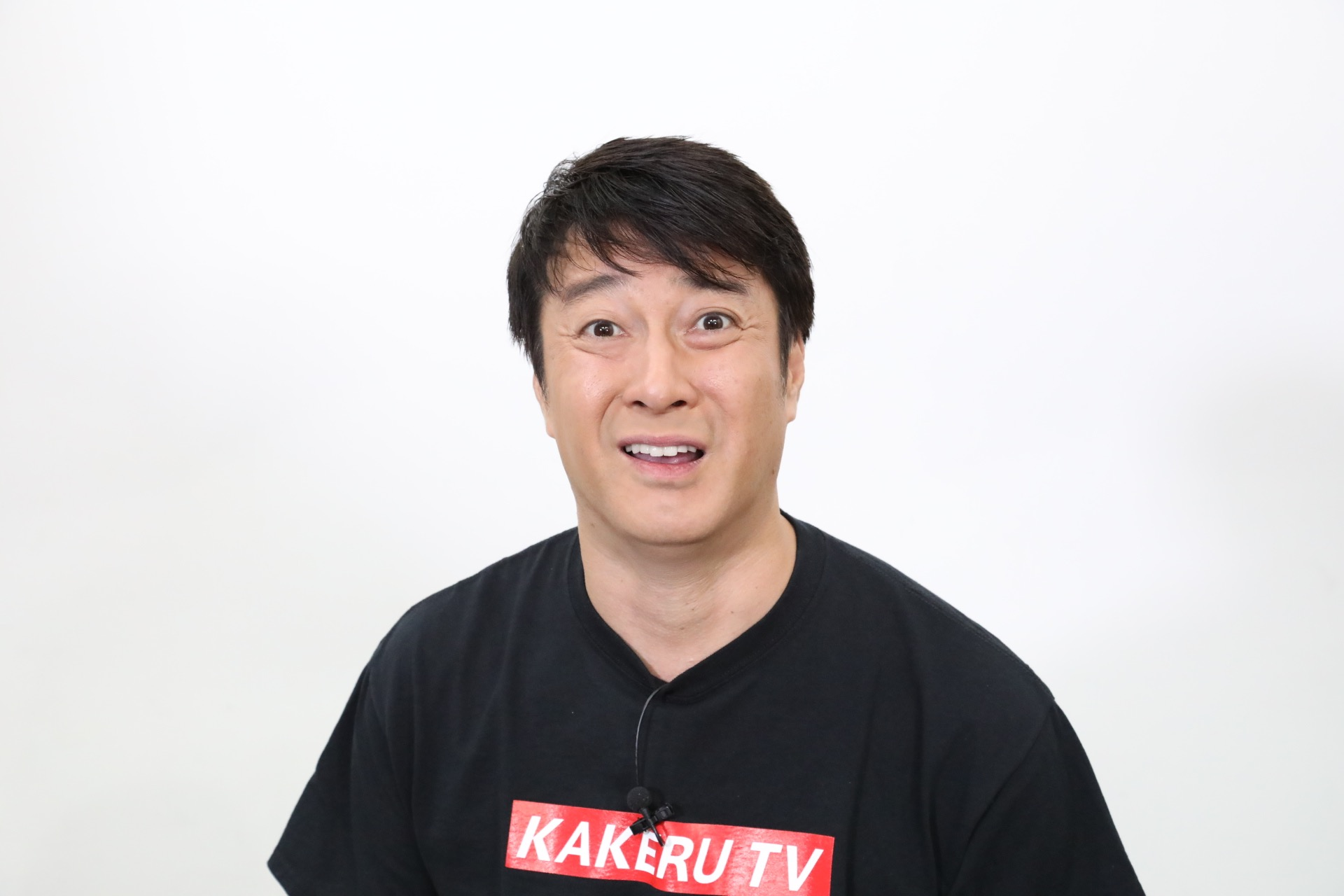
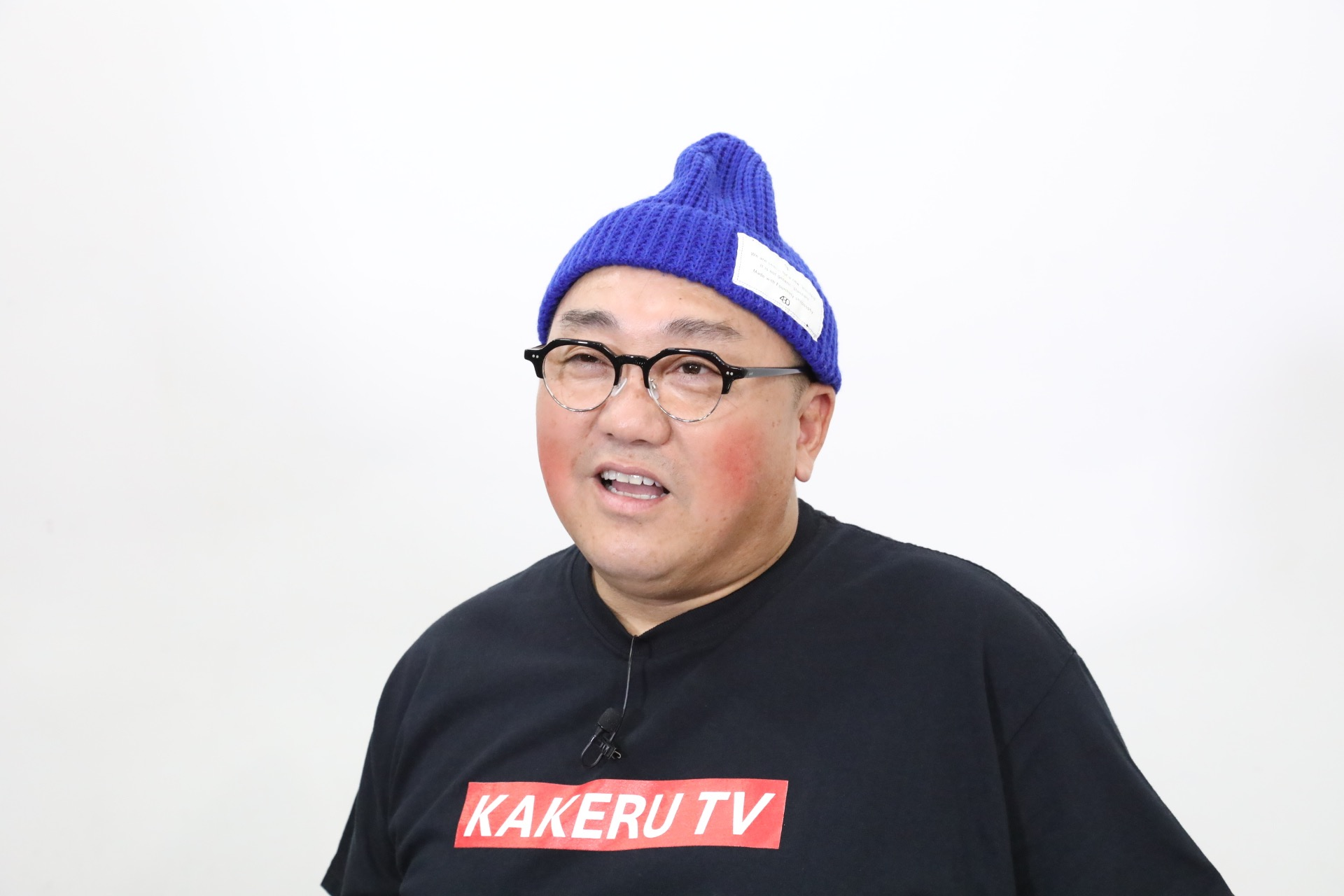
- Koji Kato (October 2017) Keiichi Yamamoto (October 2017)
- Employer: Yoshimoto Kogyo

Comedy career
- Years active: 1989 - 2006; 2016 - Present
- Members: Keiichi Yamamoto (Boke); Koji Kato (Tsukkomi)

Notes
- Same year/generation as: Ameagari Kesshitai; Jun Nagura (Neptune)

Gokuraku Tombo (極楽とんぼ, Gokuraku Tonbo), meaning Heavenly Dragonfly, was a manzai comedy duo consisting of Keiichi Yamamoto (山本 圭壱, Yamamoto Keiichi) and Koji Kato (加藤 浩次, Katō Kōji). Members of the Yoshimoto Kogyo entertainment conglomerate, they performed on the Fuji TV variety show Mecha-Mecha Iketeru! Their main act was based on arguing and fighting in public.

== Legal issues ==
Gokuraku Tombo has faced several legal troubles and backlash from the public and media alike.

On November 2, 2002, during a live performance at the J. F. Oberlin University campus festival, Yamamoto had exposed his genitals on stage and was reported to the Tokyo Metropolitan Police Department's Machida police station on the count of indecent exposure. His partner, Koji Kato, was also referred to the prosecutor's office on suspicion of aiding and abetting his partner's indecent exposure. Both were reprimanded by their agency Yoshimoto Kogyo and were forced to resign from the show Tensai Terebi-kun Wide, which they were appearing on at the time.

On June 10, 2003, an article of Yamamoto was published by FLASH magazine, accusing a hostess (then 23 years old) of having an abortion. He and the woman reportedly met in July last year at a club where the woman worked, and they began dating. When he found out she was pregnant, he asked her for an abortion, saying, "I [he] can't take responsibility.". His agency later sent an official statement through fax to the magazine, stating, "We have confirmed the facts of the relationship and pregnancy, and the fact of the abortion with the consent and agreement of both parties regarding the matter," with Yamamoto publishing an apology through his agency for "causing a fuss.".

On July 18, 2006, it was found out that Yamamoto was questioned by the Hakodate West Police station in Hokkaidō on suspicion of statutory rape of a minor. According to police reports, between July 16 and 17, Yamamoto was staying at a business hotel in Hakodate for a match with the Ibaraki Golden Goals when he met the seventeen-year-old girl partying; he had picked her up there, drank alcohol, and engaged in sexual intercourse with her. The girl, together with her parents, filed a complaint with the police station, stating that she had not consented to the sexual acts. As a result, Yoshimoto Kogyo announced the cancellation of their contract with the agency. The duo also disbanded. Yamamoto partially denied the allegations, saying that there was consent and "I [he] did not force the girl into my [his] room," but was referred to the prosecutor's office on the 29th of the same month. A settlement was reached with the victim, and ultimately, no criminal charges were filed and he was never indicted in the higher court. Kato apologized for Yamamoto's scandal on his live TV program broadcast by Nippon Television Network the next day, the whole apology was delivered as Kato wept loudly.

In 2016, Yamamoto returned to television after over a decade long hiatus and has resumed activities in the industry. He is also currently a member of Yoshimotozaka46.

== Members ==
- Koji Kato (加藤浩次, Katō Kōji; born April 26, 1969) is a Japanese comedian, actor, and TV presenter. He was born in Otaru, Hokkaido. Plays the tsukkomi. Kato married former actress and model Rin Ozawa in July 2001, together they have three children, a daughter born February 2002, a son born September 2004, and their second daughter born November 2006.
- Keiichi Yamamoto (山本圭壱, Yamamoto Keiichi; born February 23, 1968) is a Japanese comedian and YouTuber. He was born in Hiroshima City, Hiroshima Prefecture. Plays the boke. In November 2022, Yamamoto married former AKB48 member Miki Nishino, who is thirty-one years younger than him. On October 17, 2024, his wife gave birth to their first child, a daughter.
