= Wonderful Life (2004 TV series) =

Japanese drama series

- Genre: Drama
- Starring: Takashi Sorimachi; Kyōko Hasegawa; Norito Yashima; Ken Horiuchi
- Theme music composer: Ken Hirai
- Opening theme: Kimi wa Tomodachi
- Country of origin: Japan
- Original language: Japanese
- No. of episodes: 12

Production
- Producers: Hisao Ogura; Motoko Kimura

Original release
- Network: Fuji TV
- Release: April 14 – June 29, 2004

Wonderful Life (ワンダフルライフ, Wandafuru Raifu) is a Japanese drama series aired in Japan on Fuji TV in 2004. It stars Takashi Sorimachi, Kyōko Hasegawa, Norito Yashima, and Ken Horiuchi.

Akira Kirishima, played by Takashi Sorimachi, is the most famous baseball player in Japan. He is forced to retire early due to injuries. His family abandons him and he decides to spend his time coaching at a local young boys baseball team. The team is verging disbandment because they had not won one single game.

Takashi plays the popular baseball player who gives kids the hope that "dreams come true", but in reality he is arrogant and a selfish flirt who spends his money pointlessly. Mizuki Isoyama, played by Kyōko Hasegawa, wants to become a lawyer. Her brother plays on Kirishima's baseball team, but she can't stand Kirishima.

== Cast ==
- Akira Kirishima - Takashi Sorimachi
- Mizuki Isayama - Kyōko Hasegawa
- Masayoshi Tsumasaka - Norito Yashima
- Osamu Okegawa - Ken Horiuchi
- Jiro Hayashi - Hiromasa Taguchi
- Nobuko Hayashi - Inuko Inuyama
- Isao Onoda - Toshifumi Muramatsu
- Sanae Onoda - Satoko Oshima
- Mika Shinoda - Miyoko Yoshimoto
- Touko Katsuragi - Yui Ichikawa
- Yukie Isayama - Mari Hamada
- Noboru Kaneko
- Megumi Oishi
- Takeshi Masu
- Shirō Itō
- Yasushi Isayama - Masahiko Nishimura
- Ikki Sawamura episodes 5, 8
- Guest - Yoko Moriguchi

=== Momonoki Jaguars ===
- Sho Isayama - Shouhei Kawaguchi
- Konsuke - Naruki Matsukawa
- Tomohiro Kumatani
- Junya Kawakita
- ケール細山
