= Hey! Spring of Trivia =

Japanese television program

- Genre: Comedy game show
- Presented by: Katsumi Takahashi; Norito Yashima
- Judges: Tamori; Bibiru Ōki; Becky Rabone; Megumi; Hiroshi Aramata
- Narrated by: Shinji Nakae
- Country of origin: Japan
- Original language: Japanese

Production
- Production company: Fuji Television

Original release
- Network: FNS (Fuji TV)
- Release: October 7, 2002 – September 7, 2006

Hey! Spring of Trivia is the name given by Spike TV to the show The Fountain of Trivia (Japanese: トリビアの泉, Hepburn: Toribia no Izumi), a Japanese comedy game show on Fuji TV.

== Concept ==
Trivia consists of a series of video segments that introduce and confirm the validity of unusual trivia. Past trivia has included exploding erasers, spiders affected by caffeine, and insects that cannot be killed. Most of the trivia on the show is sent in by viewers. A celebrity panel of five judges (ten in special episodes) evaluate each video segment and votes on how interesting it is by pushing a "hey!"-button (へぇ~ボタン, Hē-botan) every time they are astonished. ("Hey" (へぇ, Hē) is the Japanese interjection for expressing genuine surprise, equivalent to a mix of the English interjections "Really?" and "Wow!".) The total of all "Hey"s collected during the presentation of the trivia (maximum of 20 per judge) is then used as the indicator for the degree of surprise of this trivia. For every "Hey" a piece of trivia gets, the trivia submitter receives 100 yen. Should it receive a perfect score of 100 Heys (200 in special episodes), the trivia submitter receives 100,000 yen (200,000 in special episodes). To date no piece of trivia has received 100 Heys.

At some point in the show, there is a segment called "Seed of Trivia" (トリビアの種, Toribia-no-tane). Viewers submit hypothetical questions intended to produce answers in the form of new trivia; "Trivia" then "go[es] to great lengths to answer them." Tamori (referred to as "Chairman Tamori" in the English dubbed version) evaluates the Seed of Trivia by pulling a lever. The Seed of Trivia's grade is shown as a flower. "Full bloom" (満開, Mankai) is the highest of grades. Past examples of "Seed of Trivia" segments have included the fastest Japanese baseball mascots, the brand of ramen containing the greatest net noodle length per package, and which form of barbecue lions prefer most.

As of 2005, there is a new segment called "Bog of Falsiva" (ガセビアの沼, Gasebia no Numa). This is where they take a trivia sent in by a viewer that turned out to be false and sink it in a sort of bog. Additionally, they say, "If you use this trivia, you might be called," and then they always show a cute girl (Tamaki Ogawa) doing some date-like activity and saying, "Liar" (うそつき, usotsuki) at the end of the segment.

At the end of the show, host Norito Yashima gives out "The Golden Brain" (金の脳, Kin-no-nō), a brain shaped trophy that has a melon bread inside that is in the shape of a brain, to the sender of the highest rated trivia. Co-host Katsumi Takahashi gives out "The Silver Brain" (銀の脳, Gin-no-nō) – a smaller version of The Golden Brain with the same shape but with no melon bread inside – to the sender of his favorite trivia (announced as "MFT - My Favorite Trivia"). In 2005, small color-appropriate banners were added to the awards, and in 2006, the awards began featuring a small analog clock.

== History ==
Trivia has been running in Japan since October 7, 2002, first as a low-budget program after midnight (with initially much more obscene and sexual trivia than afterwards). Its increasing cult status (the show obtained viewership ratings just above 5%) made Fuji TV shift the broadcast time to prime time July 2, 2003.

On November 4, 2004 Fuji TV announced that twenty six episodes of Trivia would be adapted for broadcast in the United States on the cable network Spike TV (now Paramount Network). The network began airing the slightly edited English dubbed version of the show on November 11, with the broadcast ending in May 2005. The editing included the removal of certain culturally specific trivia pieces such as those referring to Japanese history and actors. The shorter run time was made up for by adding trivia pieces from other episodes. Unlike Spike TV's other Japanese show MXC, the English dialogue was mostly based on the original Japanese utterances and texts, although it was often exaggerated in a comical manner. Spike had planned to produce an American version of the show premiering in Spring 2005, but that version never materialized and the network decided against ordering more episodes of the English dub.

== See also ==
- Sponge (TV series)
- MythBusters
