= Nana Yanagisawa =

Japanese fashion model and actress

- Born: Reina Yanagisawa; January 3, 1987 (age 39); Yokohama, Kanagawa Prefecture, Japan
- Occupations: Actress, fashion model
- Years active: 2001 - present
- Website: sunmusic.org/nana

Nana Yanagisawa (柳沢 なな, Yanagisawa Nana; born January 3, 1987) is a Japanese fashion model, gravure idol and actress. She appeared in Kamen Rider Kiva as Megumi Aso, one of the lead heroines. She also starred in Kamen Rider Kiva: King of the Castle in the Demon World as this role. She also had a guest appearance as Phantom Thief Selene in Task 13 of GoGo Sentai Boukenger. She also plays an important role in Forbidden Siren 2, a survival horror game for the PlayStation 2 console, where her face model and voice was implemented for main character Ikuko Kifune (木船 郁子 Kifune Ikuko).

== Filmography ==
=== TV, cinema, movie, game ===
- 2008 - Kamen Rider Kiva (Tokusatsu series, TV Asahi) as Megumi Aso
- 2008 - Kamen Rider Kiva The Movie: The King of Hell Castle as Megumi Aso
- 2006 - GoGo Sentai Boukenger as Phantom Thief Selene
- 2006 - Forbidden Siren 2 (PlayStation 2) as Ikuko Kifune
- 2003 - Battle Royale II: Requiem as Mayu Hasuda

== Discography ==
- "Feel the same" with Yu Takahashi, 2008
- "Inherited-System", 2008
