= Survivor Japan: Philippines =

- Presented by: Nepture & Munehiro Tokita
- No. of days: 39
- No. of castaways: 16
- Winner: Yasuhito Ebisawa
- Runner-up: Sei Sugawara
- Location: Siquijor, Philippines.
- No. of episodes: 10

Release
- Original release: October 15 – December 17, 2002

Season chronology
- ← Previous; Hokkaido Next → North Mariana

Survivor Japan: Philippines, was the third season of Survivor Japan and it aired from October 15, 2002, to December 17, 2002. This season was set in Siquijor, Philippines.

The original tribes for this season were named Dalahican (ダラヒガン, Darahigan) and Ompus (ウンパス, Unpasu), and the merged tribe was named Tigum (ティゴム, Tigomu). As a new rule, contestants could win rewards without having to compete in reward challenges against the other tribe. In these challenges, each tribe could obtain rewards when they achieved a certain goal. Beginning with this season, each player could bring one luxury item. These items things couldn't be used as tools to survive on the island.

Prior to the tribe merge, both tribes had to burn their camp down, and to move to the specified new island. Also beginning with this season the number of jury members increased from six to seven. Ultimately, it was construction worker Yasuhito Ebisawa, who won the season by a vote of 4-3 over bar owner Sei Sugawara. Following his victory, Ebisawa went on to become an actor in Japan.

== Finishing order ==
| Contestant | Original Tribe | Merged Tribe | Finish |
|---|---|---|---|
| Miyuki Hayakawa; 24, Kanagawa | Dalahican | | 1st Voted Out; Day 4 |
| Naoko Hara; 22, Kanagawa | Darahican | | 2nd Voted Out; Day 7 |
| Keiko Tamaki; 23, Aichi | Ompus | | Evacuated; Day 10 |
| Rieko Ueda; 27, Ibaraki | Ompus | | 3rd Voted Out; Day 10 |
| Yuki Nakajima; 24, Chiba | Ompus | | 4th Voted Out; Day 13 |
| Shigeo Hattori; 23, Gifu | Dalahican | | 5th Voted Out; Day 16 |
| Hidemi Miyanishi; 24, Osaka | Ompus | Tigum | 6th Voted Out; Day 19 |
| Mina Kitsuya; 29, Tokyo | Dalahican | Tigum | 7th Voted Out; 1st Jury Member; Day 22 |
| Kiyoshi Sunako; 32, Osaka | Ompus | Tigum | 8th Voted Out; 2nd Jury Member; Day 25 |
| Tomoyuki Yoshioka; 27, Kyoto | Dalahican | Tigum | 9th Voted Out; 3rd Jury Member; Day 28 |
| Junko Ohki; 27, Kanagawa | Dalahican | Tigum | 10th Voted Out; 4th Jury Member; Day 31 |
| Koumei Hirayama; 24, Nagasaki | Ompus | Tigum | 11th Voted Out; 5th Jury Member; Day 34 |
| Yukio Ishihara; 33, Tokyo | Dalahican | Tigum | 12th Voted Out; 6th Jury Member; Day 37 |
| Izumi Aiyoshi; 19, Tokyo | Ompus | Tigum | 13th Voted Out; 7th Jury Member; Day 38 |
| Sei Sugawara; 26, Ibaraki | Dalahican | Tigum | Runner-Up; Day 39 |
| Yasuhito Ebisawa; 27, Aomori | Ompus | Tigum | Sole Survivor; Day 39 |

== Voting history ==
| | Original Tribes | | | | | | Merged Tribe | | | | | | | | | |
|---|---|---|---|---|---|---|---|---|---|---|---|---|---|---|---|---|
| Episode #: | 1 | 2 | | 3 | | 4 | 5 | 6 | | 7 | | 8 | | 9 | Reunion | |
| Eliminated: | Miyuki; 7-1 | Naoko; 4-3 | Eiko; No vote | Kenkyu; 5-2 | Keiko; 4-2 | Shigeo; 4-1-1 | Hidemi; 6-3-1 | Mina; 4-3-2 | Kiyoshi; 4-3-1 | Hiroyuki; 5-2 | Junko; 3-2-1 | Koumei; 3-1-1 | Yukio; 2-2^{1} | Izumi; 1-0 | Sei; 3/7 votes | Yasuhito; 4/7 votes |
| Voter | Vote | | | | | | | | | | | | | | | |
| Yasuhito | | | | Kenkyu | Keiko | | Hidemi | Mina | Sei | Hiroyuki | Junko | Koumei | Yukio | Izumi | Jury Vote | |
| Sei | Miyuki | Naoko | | | | Junko | Hidemi | Mina | Kiyoshi | Hiroyuki | Junko | Izumi | Izumi | | Jury Vote | |
| Izumi | | | | Kenkyu | Yasuhito | | Hidemi | Koumei | Kiyoshi | Hiroyuki | Sei | Koumei | Yukio | | | Yasuhito |
| Yukio | Miyuki | Junko | | | | Shigeo | Hidemi | Mina | Kiyoshi | Hiroyuki | Junko | Koumei | Izumi | | Sei | |
| Koumei | | | | Kenkyu | Keiko | | Junko | Sei | Izumi | Sei | Yukio | Yukio | | | Sei | |
| Junko | Miyuki | Naoko | | | | Shigeo | Hidemi | Koumei | Kiyoshi | Hiroyuki | Sei | | | | Sei | |
| Hiroyuki | Miyuki | Junko | | | | Shigeo | Junko | Sei | Sei | Sei | | | | | | Yasuhito |
| Kiyoshi | | | | Kenkyu | Keiko | | Yukio | Mina | Sei | | | | | | | Yasuhito |
| Mina | Miyuki | Naoko | | | | Shigeo | Hidemi | Koumei | | | | | | | | Yasuhito |
| Hidemi | | | | Kenkyu | Keiko | | Junko | | | | | | | | | |
| Shigeo | Miyuki | Naoko | | | | Hiroyuki | | | | | | | | | | |
| Keiko | | | | Yasuhito | Yasuhito | | | | | | | | | | | |
| Kenkyu | | | | Yasuhito | | | | | | | | | | | | |
| Eiko | | | | | | | | | | | | | | | | |
| Naoko | Miyuki | Junko | | | | | | | | | | | | | | |
| Miyuki | Naoko | | | | | | | | | | | | | | | |

^1 As Izumi and Yukio both received two votes at the twelfth tribal council, the number of votes each had received at previous tribal councils was taken into account. Izumi had 2 previous votes but Yukio had 3, therefore Yukio was eliminated.
