= Ken Horiuchi =

Japanese comedian

- 堀内 健
- Born: 28 November 1969 (age 56); Yokosuka, Kanagawa, Japan
- Other names: Horiken; Ken-chan (健ちゃん)
- Education: Tokyo Institute of Tourism Travel Department
- Occupations: Comedian; actor
- Years active: 1990–present
- Agent: Watanabe Entertainment
- Notable work: All Night Nippon; Ken Horiuchi Kō Hakusho
- Style: Conte
- Television: Ariken; Horipei; Punscapun; Fight Tension Depart
- Height: 1.69 m (5 ft 7 in)
- Partners: Jun Nagura; Taizo Harada

Notes
- Same year/generation as: Fujiwara; Chihara Kyodai

Ken Horiuchi (堀内 健, Horiuchi Ken; born 28 November 1969, in Yokosuka, Kanagawa, Japan) is a Japanese comedian who performs boke in the comedy trio Neptune. He is nicknamed Horiken (ホリケン). He also creates stories for the trio.

Horiuchi's persona on stage and TV is known to be immature, childish and hyper-active. His comedic style is unique in the sense that he has little limits and often goes far or all-out in pursuing comedic effects.

Horiuchi is represented with Watanabe Entertainment. He is now married.

== Filmography ==
To see his appearances with Neptune, see Neptune (owarai).

=== Variety ===
Regular

Year	Title	Network
2014	Hori-TV One Uchi-TV Two Ken-TV Next	Fuji TV One Two Next

Occasional

Year	Title	Network
	Sanma no Owarai Kōjō Iinkai	Fuji TV
	Ameagari Ketsushitai no Talk Bangumi Ame-talk!	TV Asahi
	Mecha-Mecha Iketeru!	Fuji TV
2012	Bakusei Red Carpet	Fuji TV
	Horiken fureai Tabi: Ningentteīna	TV Asahi

Broadcasts

Year	Title	Network
	Punscapun	Fuji TV
	Warai no Kin Medal	ABC
	Fight Tension Depart	TV Tokyo
	Fight Tension School	TV Tokyo
	Horipei	BS Japan
	Ariken	TV Tokyo
	Ari nashi: Ariken-Golden Stadium	TV Tokyo
	Lincoln	TBS
2011	Tokyo Hit Girl	NTV
2012	Tokyo Etoile Ongaku-in	NTV

He appeared in other variety and talk shows as himself. In other programmes with Neptune, Horiuchi showed how he has a profile as a solo entertainer (to see Neptune's appearances, see Neptune (owarai)).

=== TV drama ===
Year	Title	Role	Network	Notes	Ref.
2002	Boku ga Chikyū o Sukuu	Hiroshi Sakurashinmachi	TBS		
2003	Kōgen e irasshai		TBS		
2004	Wonderful Life		Fuji TV		
2004	Koi no kara Sawagi –Love Stories– Umi ni Otosa reta Onna		NTV		
2008	Nipponshi Suspense Gekijō		NTV		
2008	Koi no kara Sawagi –Love Stories V– Kinboshi kara Kita Onna		NTV		
2009	The Quiz Show	Makoto Katsuragi	NTV	Episode 6	
2009	Hidarime Tantei Eye		NTV		
2015	Boku no Tsuma to Kekkon shite kudasai.	Horiuchi	NHK, BS Premium	Episode 4	

=== Films ===
Year	Title	Role
2008	Kamen Rider Kiva: King of the Castle in the Demon World	Takashi Sugimura / Kamen Rider Arc

=== Radio ===
Year	Title	Network
2002	Ken Horiuchi to Bibiru Ōki no All Night Nippon	NBS
2015	Ken Horiuchi to Tetsurō Degawa no All Night Nippon	

=== Advertisements ===
Year	Title
2009	Holiday Shaken

=== Stage ===
Year	Title	Ref.
2014	Horiuchi Yoru ake no Kai: Kyōfu Tako Kōen no Tako Onna	
2015	Horiuchi Yoru ake no Kai: Omae wa Shibuya no Yomawari Ojisan janai!!	

== Bibliography ==
Year	Title
2003	Ken Horiuchi Kō Hakusho

== Discography ==
Year	Title	Notes
2003	"Horiken Size II / Oaniyan"	With Oaneyan & Takamī
