= Aka Plu =

Japanese comedian (born 1977)

- 赤 プル
- Born: Yuko Kusama; September 26, 1977 (age 49); Jōsō, Ibaraki Prefecture, Japan
- Occupation: Comedian
- Agent: Ohta Production
- Height: 1.58 m (5 ft 2 in)
- Spouse: Shingo Matsuoka (2011 -)

Yuko Matsuoka (松丘 夕子, Matsuoka Yūko; née Kusama (草間), born September 26, 1977, in Jōsō, Ibaraki Prefecture, Japan), better known as Aka Plu (赤 プル, Aka Puru), is a Japanese comedian who is represented by the talent agency, Ohta Production. Her old stage name was Akai Plutonium (赤い プルトニウム, Akai Purutoniumu). Her husband is Shingo Matsuoka which they were a comedy duo called Aka Plu to Danna (which renamed to Chime in March 2015).

Plu graduated from Ibaraki Prefectural Mitsukaido Second High School.

== Filmography ==
=== TV series ===
Year	Title	Network	Notes
	Goro's Bar	TBS	
	Warai no Kin Medal	TV Asahi	
2004	Shibusuta SBST	TV Tokyo	
2005	Asa wa Tanoshiku! Smile Supplement	TV Tokyo	
	Kanningu no Renai Chūdoku	GyaO!	
2008	Kusano Kid	TV Asahi	
	Emita Imu 2008	NHK-BS2	
	Bakushō Red Carpet	Fuji TV	
2009	Shinshun Golden Pink Carpet SP	Fuji TV	
2009	Maōdensetsu: Idol Battle Survival	TV Saitama	
2009	Nekketsu! Heisei Kyōiku Gakuin	Fuji TV	
2009	London Hearts	TV Asahi	
2010	Bakushō Ichiban	AKT	
2010	Yohane no Senrei	TBS	
2011	Shinseki Neta King Kettei-sen	Tokyo MX	
2011	Pu tsu Sma	TV Asahi	
2013	Garigari Kuryimu	TV Asahi	

== Drama ==
Title	Role	Network	Notes
Enka no Joō		NTV	Episode 5
Untouchable		TV Asahi	Episode 6
Hanchō: Jinnan-sho Asaka Han	Yurina Misaki	TBS	Episode 8

=== Radio series ===
Title	Network	Notes
Rajika Tropsch	Radio Nippon	
Othello Nakajima no Kuroshinju Fujin	TBS Radio	
Ieyasu Radio	CBC Radio	
Masaru Miyagawa no Ohayō! Spoon	Radio Nippon	

=== Internet series ===
Year	Title	Network	Notes
2005	Saimi!! Naito	Atsu! To Odoroku Hōsōkyoku	
	Atsu! To Geinin Collection	Atsu! To Odoroku Hōsōkyoku	
2008	Oliver's World	Atsu! To Odoroku Hōsōkyoku	

=== Music videos ===
Title	Notes
Ura Echi "Princess Princess"	

=== Magazines ===
Title	Notes
Friday	Kodansha
