= Survivor Japan: North Mariana =

- Presented by: Neptune and Munehiro Tokita
- No. of days: 39
- No. of castaways: 16
- Winner: Koshin Gunji
- Runner-up: Atsuko Koizumi
- Location: Rota, Northern Mariana Islands
- No. of episodes: 9

Release
- Original release: January 14 – March 11, 2003

Season chronology
- ← Previous; Philippines

Survivor Japan: North Mariana, was the fourth and final season of Survivor Japan and it aired from January 14, 2003, to March 11, 2003. This season was set in Rota, in the Northern Mariana Islands.

The original tribes this season were named Somnak (ソムナック, Somunakku) and Manglo (マングル, Manguru), and the merged tribe was named Langet (ランヘット, Ranhetto). The major twist this season took place after the first three contestants had been eliminated. A challenge called 'Shuffle Challenge' was held, and as a result, three members from each tribe were switched to the opposing tribe. Midway through the season, a typhoon hit the island and the remaining contestants were forced to live in a cave for several days. Ultimately, it was Kōshin Gunji who won the season by a jury vote of 5-2 over Atsuko Koizumi.

== Finishing order ==
Contestant	Original Tribe	Episode 3 Tribe	Merged Tribe	Finish
Ryouka Yamada; 22, Aichi	Manglo			1st Voted Out; Day 4
Izumi Kabayama; 24, Tokyo	Somnak			2nd Voted Out; Day 7
Takeshi Kanbara; 27,	Somnak			3rd Voted Out; Day 10
Eiichi Kishimoto; 35, Saitama	Somnak	Somnak		4th Voted Out; Day 13
Emiko Takahashi; 27, Tokyo	Manglo	Somnak		5th Voted Out; Day 16
Toshihiro Kuriki; 44, Fukuoka	Somnak	Manglo		6th Voted Out; Day 19
Yuka Ito; 29, Saitama	Somnak	Somnak	Langet	7th Voted Out; Day 23
Youju Kobayashi; 45, Tochigi	Manglo	Manglo	Langet	8th Voted Out; 1st Jury Member; Day 26
Hiroaki Mano; 27, Tokyo	Manglo	Somnak	Langet	9th Voted Out; 2nd Jury Member; Day 29
Kaoru Kamioka; 27, Kyoto	Manglo	Manglo	Langet	10th Voted Out; 3rd Jury Member; Day 32
Takae Shimazaki; 28, Kanagawa	Somnak	Manglo	Langet	11th Voted Out; 4th Jury Member; Day 34
Kayo Shibuya; 24, Niigata	Somnak	Somnak	Langet	12th Voted Out; 5th Jury Member; Day 36
Keita Inoue; 22, Hyōgo	Manglo	Somnak	Langet	13th Voted Out; 6th Jury Member; Day 37
Motoki Fukami; 22, Tokyo	Somnak	Manglo	Langet	14th Voted Out; 7th Jury Member; Day 38
Atsuko Koizumi; 24, Kanagawa	Manglo	Manglo	Langet	Runner-Up; Day 39
Kōshin Gunji; 37, Ibaraki	Manglo	Manglo	Langet	Sole Survivor; Day 39

== Voting history ==
	Original Tribes			Mixed Tribes			Merged Tribe									
Episode #:	1	2	3		4		5	6		7			8		Reunion	
Eliminated:	Ryouka; 4-3-1	Izumi; 6-2	Takeshi; 5-1-1	Eiichi; 3-2-1	Emiko; 4-1	Toshiro; 6-1	Yuka; 5-5^{1}	Youju; 4-2-2-1	Hiroaki; 4-3-1	Kaoru; 5-2	Takae; 3-2-1	Kayo; 3-2	Keita; 2-1-1	Motoki; 1-0	Atsuko; 2/7 votes	Kōshin; 5/7 votes
Voter	Vote															
Kōshin	Emiko					Toshiro	Yuka	Youju	Hiroaki	Kaoru	Takae	Kayo	Keita		Jury Vote	
Atsuko	Ryouka					Toshiro	Kōshin	Motoki	Takae	Kaoru	Motoki	Motoki	Motoki	Motoki	Jury Vote	
Motoki		Izumi	Takeshi			Toshiro	Yuka	Youju	Hiroaki	Kaoru	Kayo	Kayo	Keita			Kōshin
Keita	Ryouka			Eiichi	Emiko		Kōshin	Youju	Takae	Kaoru	Takae	Kayo	Kōshin			Kōshin
Kayo		Izumi	Eiichi	Emiko	Emiko		Kōshin	Motoki	Kaoru	Kaoru	Takae	Motoki				Kōshin
Takae		Izumi	Takeshi			Toshiro	Yuka	Youju	Hiroaki	Atsuko	Kayo					Kōshin
Kaoru	Atsuko					Toshiro	Yuka	Atsuko	Hiroaki	Atsuko						Kōshin
Hiroaki	Ryouka			Eiichi	Emiko		Kōshin	Kōshin	Takae						Atsuko	
Youju	Ryouka					Toshiro	Yuka	Kōshin							Atsuko	
Yuka		Izumi	Takeshi	Emiko	Emiko		Kōshin									
Toshiro		Izumi	Takeshi			Kōshin										
Emiko	Atsuko			Eiichi	Kayo											
Eiichi		Yuka	Takeshi	Hiroaki												
Takeshi		Izumi	Yuka													
Izumi		Yuka														
Ryouka	Atsuko															

^1 As Kōshin and Yuka both received five votes at the seventh tribal council, the number of votes each had received at previous tribal councils was taken into account. Kōshin had one previous vote, but Yuka had three therefore Yuka was eliminated.
