= Mika Oguma =

Japanese freelance announcer

- 小熊 美香
- Born: 25 March 1986 (age 39); Fujinomiya, Shizuoka, Japan
- Other names: Oguman
- Education: Sophia University Foreign Language Department English studies
- Years active: 2008–
- Employer: Nippon TV
- Known for: Her maternity leave and annual leave paid holidays (2017)
- Television: Former; Zip!; news every.; Zoom In!! Super; Oha!4 News Live; Oguma no Bear Heya; Bakana Furi shite Kiite mita; Kewpie 3-bun Cooking; Nittele Up Date!
- Children: 2

Mika Oguma (小熊 美香, Oguma Mika; born 25 March 1986) is a freelance announcer. She was formerly a female announcer for Nippon TV.

== Biography ==
She is originally from Fujinomiya, Shizuoka, but born in Tama, Tokyo. She participated in a campus park program alongside Yoshie Takeuchi, Masako Yagi, Yuka Aiuchi, and others who later became announcers for different stations.

She remains friends with Takeuchi to this day.

She graduated from Sophia University's Department of Foreign Languages, majoring in English studies. While attending Kirayama High School, she spent a year studying in Canada. After completing her university education, she joined Nippon TV in April 2008. During her entrance ceremony, the performers of Radio De Culture made a surprise appearance, and she was interviewed by them.

Starting on 1 April 2009, she took charge of her first solo program, Oguma no Bear Heya.

On 9 July 2009, she was selected as a member of the announcer unit Bears.

Starting on 7 October 2009, she served as the main caster for the first time on Oha!4 News Live.

She began serving as a presenter on News Every. starting on 29 March 2010. The following year, in October, she was promoted to the position of news caster, succeeding Izumi Maruoka.

She married a non-celebrity office worker on 10 August 2013.

On 21 March 2014, she graduated from News Every. Subsequently, on 31 March, she joined ZIP! as the second-generation news caster.

On 17 February 2017, she announced her first pregnancy during the program ZIP!.

On 31 March 2017, after serving as a news caster for ZIP! for about three years, she graduated from the program to begin her maternity leave. Erika Tokushima, her senior, became her successor.

On 30 May 2017, she retired from Kewpie 3-bun Cooking, a program she had been a part of since 2012.

She gave birth to her first child on 24 July 2017.

On 18 December 2017, she announced her plan to retire from Nippon TV, where she had worked for ten years, as she "wanted to devote herself to child-rearing after the birth of her first child."

On 3 August 2020, she announced her second pregnancy. She gave birth to her second child on 19 September.

Since June 2021, she has been managed by Appre.

== Past in charge/appearance programmes ==
Regular

- Ichioshi!! Nittele Ana-chan Rookies (Nittele Plus, 6 Sep 2008 – 5 Feb 2009)
- Zoom In!! Super - Weather corner "Kuma Tore" (1 Oct 2008 to 2 Oct 2009 Weekdays, from 5 Oct 2009 until 23 Mar 2010, in charge of Mondays and Tuesdays)
- Oha!4 News Live (Wednesdays–Fridays, 7 Oct 2009 – 26 Mar 2010)
- Oguma no Bear Heya (2 Apr 2009 – 24 Aug 2010)
- Bakana Furi shite Kiite mita (29 Mar 2010 – 21 Mar 2014, Weekdays)
- news every. (Assistant 19 Apr – 20 Sep 2011)
- Zip! (31 Mar 2014 – 31 Mar 2017, broadcast every day of the week newscaster)
- Kewpie 3-bun Cooking (2 Jul 2012 – 30 May 2017, Mondays, Tuesdays, Saturdays)
- Nittele Up Date! (7 Oct 2012 – unknown)
- Uchimura Terrace (22 Jan 2016 – 30 Mar 2018)

One-off

- Sports broadcasting such as football
- Radio De Culture (1 Apr 2008)
- Tensai!! Company (21 Aug 2008, VTR appearance)
- Asu no Tenki
- NFL club
- Tensai! Shimura Dōbutsuen (23 May 2009, recorded Mar 2009) – Pankun's social studies training, as new announcer. Showed off her gospel singing.
- Touch! eco 2009 Ima, Watashitachi ni dekiru koto. Zoom In!! Super × News Zero (7 Jun 2009) event reporter
- Shōten Announcer Ōgiri (2176th, 2248th, 2327th broadcasts)
- Monomane Grand Prix (21 Sep 2009)
- Captain! TV (30 Apr 2010)
- News Zero (24 Jun 2010) – Football World Cup Japan vs Denmark, relaying from the Danish Embassy's last appearance
- Hirunandesu! (29, 30 Sep 2011, 17–19 Sep 2012, Asami Miura's representative)
- 24 Hour Television Kensuke Sasaki Family Charity Marathon Commentary (Together with Taichi Masu. 25, 26 Aug 2012)
- Hana no Tele Kana-chan Part 1 (KTK, 16 May 2014) Guests on the day before the talk show at "Telegraph Hospitality Festa"
- NNN Straight News (25–27 Aug 2014, 22–26 Aug 2016, 4–6 Jan 2017, Fumi Mori's agent)

== Music videos ==
- TVXQ – Kiss the Baby Sky
  - Cast appearance with three people with announcers Shinichi Hatori and Yukari Nishio
