= Mai Sekiguchi =

Japanese actress

Mai Sekiguchi (関口まい, Sekiguchi Mai; born January 11, 1983) is a Japanese actress. She played Kaori Minami in Battle Royale.

She is represented with Ohta Production.
