= Taizo Harada =

Japanese comedian and actor (born 1970)

- 原田 泰造
- Born: 24 March 1970 (age 56); Hiroshima, Hiroshima Prefecture
- Other names: Taizō; Tai-chan (泰ちゃん)
- Occupations: Comedian; actor
- Years active: 1990–present
- Agent: Watanabe Entertainment
- Style: Conte
- Partners: Jun Nagura; Ken Horiuchi
- Awards: 1998 Golden Arrow Award Popularity Award; 2005 Golden Arrow Award Newcomer Award

Notes
- Same year/generation as: Fujiwara; Buffalo Goro; Chihara Kyodai

Taizo Harada (原田 泰造, Harada Taizō; born March 24, 1970, in Hiroshima, Hiroshima Prefecture) is a Japanese comedian and actor who performs boke in the comedy trio Neptune. He is nicknamed Taizō (タイゾー).

Harada is represented with Watanabe Entertainment. He is a father with two children. Harada has an older sister and a younger brother.

== Filmography ==
=== TV drama ===
Year	Title	Role	Notes	Ref.
2008	Atsuhime	Ōkubo Toshimichi	Taiga drama	
2010	Ryōmaden	Kondō Isami	Taiga drama	
2012	Man of Destiny	Takuya Miki		
2015	Burning Flower	Sugi Minji	Taiga drama	
2016	Kuro no Shamen	Takashi Tsujii		
2016	Cont Rail: Tsumi to Koi	Shigeru Sasaoka		
2016	Eigyō Buchō: Natsuko Kira	Kotaro Koyama		
2016	The Sniffer	Goro Kashina	Episode 5	
2022	Invisible	Shogo Inukai		
2023	Ōoku: The Inner Chambers	Saigō Takamori		
2023	Tengu no Daidokoro	Ellis Wilson		
2024	Who Cares?	Makoto Okita	Lead role	
2025	Unbound	Miura Shōji	Taiga drama	
2026	The Scent of the Wind	Zensaku Yoshie	Asadora	

=== Films ===
Year	Title	Role	Notes	Ref.
2006	Peanuts	Cop		
2018	Midnight Buss	Toshikazu Takamiya	Lead role	
2018	Stolen Identity	Tōru Busujima		
2020	Stolen Identity 2	Tōru Busujima		
2021	The Door into Summer	Tarō Satō		
2021	It's a Flickering Life			
2024	Stolen Identity: Final Hacking Game	Tōru Busujima		
2025	Under the Big Onion	Takeru's father		
2025	Who Cares?: The Movie	Makoto Okita	Lead role	
2026	Labyrinth	Komori (voice)		
2026	Until We Meet Again	Masashi Nagano		
2026	Hoshi no Kyoshitsu			
2026	Your Story: Kimi No Hanashi	Chihiro's father		
2027	A List for Tomorrow	Koji Tanaka	Taiwanese-Japanese film	

=== Dubbing ===
- Strange World, Searcher Clade
