= Survivor Japan: Palau =

- Presented by: Neptune & Munehiro Tokita
- No. of days: 39
- No. of castaways: 16
- Winner: Eri Minoshima
- Runner-up: Daisuke Yoshino
- Location: Ngemelis Islands of Palau
- No. of episodes: 12

Release
- Original release: April 9 – June 18, 2002

Season chronology
- Next → Hokkaido

Survivor Japan: Palau, was the first season of Survivor Japan and it aired from April 9, 2002, to June 18, 2002. This season was set in the Ngemelis Islands of Palau.

The original tribes for this season were named Bekeu (ベケウ, Bekeu) and Deleb (デレブ, Derebu), and the merge tribe was named Sage Sils (シルス賢者, Shirusu Kenja). Prior to the tribe merge, one player was sent to the ship from each tribe, and they discussed which camp to live in after the merge. At the final tribal council there seemed to be little doubt in the jury's mind on who deserved to be the Sole Survivor.

Eventually, it was diving instructor Eri Minoshima who won the season and 10,000,000 Yen by a vote of 5-0 over priest Daisuke Yoshino. There were six members of the jury, but Junko Matsuo refused to vote for either Daisuke or Eri because she did not believe that either castaway was worthy of being the Sole Survivor.

Hiromi Goto was an associate producer.

== Finishing Order ==
| Contestant | Original Tribe | Merged Tribe | Finish |
|---|---|---|---|
| Kyomi Kuwano; 40, | Deleb | | 1st Voted Out; Day 4 |
| Norikazu Sato; 23, | Bekeu | | 2nd Voted Out; Day 7 |
| Takeshi Kasuga; 34, Tokyo | Bekeu | | 3rd Voted Out; Day 10 |
| Taizo Okabe; 26, | Deleb | | 4th Voted Out; Day 13 |
| Tomoko Ishige; 25, | Bekeu | | 5th Voted Out; Day 16 |
| Kazue Hirakawa; 31, Hōfu | Bekeu | | 6th Voted Out; Day 19 |
| Kuniyuki Takanami; 23, Tokyo | Bekeu | Sage Sils | 7th Voted Out; Day 22 |
| Mina Shibuya; 19, Tokyo | Bekeu | Sage Sils | Evacuated; Day 25 |
| Taku Hirai; 26, Tokyo | Bekeu | Sage Sils | 8th Voted Out; 1st Jury Member; Day 28 |
| Yasue Wakamatsu; 27, Nishio | Bekeu | Sage Sils | 9th Voted Out; 2nd Jury Member; Day 31 |
| Satoshi Ono; 32, Tokyo | Deleb | Sage Sils | 10th Voted Out; 3rd Jury Member; Day 34 |
| Atsuo Kuroiwa; 56, Tokyo | Deleb | Sage Sils | 11th Voted Out; 4th Jury Member; Day 36 |
| Junko Matsuo; 36, Tokyo | Deleb | Sage Sils | 12th Voted Out; 5th Jury Member; Day 37 |
| Mizuka Nakajima; 30, Tokyo | Deleb | Sage Sils | 13th Voted Out; 6th Jury Member; Day 38 |
| Daisuke Yoshino; 30, | Deleb | Sage Sils | Runner-Up; Day 39 |
| Eri Minoshima; 28, Tokyo | Deleb | Sage Sils | Sole Survivor; Day 39 |

== Voting History ==
| | Original Tribes | | | | | | Merged Tribe | | | | | | | | | |
|---|---|---|---|---|---|---|---|---|---|---|---|---|---|---|---|---|
| Episode #: | 1 | | 2 | 3 | 4 | 5 | 6 | 7 | 8 | 9 | 10 | 11 | | 12 | Reunion | |
| Eliminated: | Kyomi; 5-2-1 | Norikazu; 4-3-1 | Takeshi; 4-3 | Taizo; 5-2 | Tomogo; 4-2 | Kazue; 3-2 | Kuniyuki; 6-3-1 | Mina; No vote^{1} | Taku; 5-2-1 | Megumi; 5-2 | Satoshi; 3-3^{2} | Atsuo; 4-1 | Junko; 2-2^{3} | Mizuka; 1-0 | Daisuke; 0/5 votes^{4} | Eri; 5/5 votes^{4} |
| Voter | Vote | | | | | | | | | | | | | | | |
| Eri | Daisuke | | | Taizo | | | Kuniyuki | | Taku | Megumi | Satoshi | Atsuo | Junko | | Jury Vote | |
| Daisuke | Kyomi | | | Taizo | | | Kuniyuki | | Satoshi | Satoshi | Satoshi | Atsuo | Junko | Mizuka | Jury Vote | |
| Mizuka | Kyomi | | | Taizo | | | Kuniyuki | | Taku | Megumi | Daisuke | Atsuo | Eri | | | Eri |
| Junko | Kyomi | | | Taizo | | | Kuniyuki | | Taku | Megumi | Satoshi | Atsuo | Eri | | | |
| Atsuo | Daisuke | | | Junko | | | Kuniyuki | | Taku | Megumi | Daisuke | Daisuke | | | | Eri |
| Satoshi | Kyomi | | | Taizo | | | Kuniyuki | | Taku | Megumi | Daisuke | | | | | Eri |
| Yasue | | Norikazu | Takeshi | | Tomogo | Kazue | Satoshi | | Daisuke | Satoshi | | | | | | Eri |
| Taku | | Takeshi | Tomogo | | Tomogo | Kazue | Junko | | Daisuke | | | | | | | Eri |
| Mina | | Takeshi | Takeshi | | Megumi | Megumi | Satoshi | | | | | | | | | |
| Kuniyuki | | Norikazu | Tomogo | | Tomogo | Kazue | Satoshi | | | | | | | | | |
| Kazue | | Takeshi | Takeshi | | Tomogo | Megumi | | | | | | | | | | |
| Tomogo | | Norikazu | Takeshi | | Megumi | | | | | | | | | | | |
| Taizo | Kyomi | | | Junko | | | | | | | | | | | | |
| Takeshi | | Norikazu | Tomogo | | | | | | | | | | | | | |
| Norikazu | | Mina | | | | | | | | | | | | | | |
| Kyomi | Junko | | | | | | | | | | | | | | | |

^1 Mina was evacuated for medical reasons in episode 8. As a result, that episode's tribal council was cancelled.

^2 As Daisuke and Satoshi both received three votes at the tenth tribal council, the number of votes each had received at previous tribal councils were counted. The person with the most votes would be eliminated. Daisuke had 4 votes and Satoshi had 6 votes. Therefore, Satoshi was eliminated

^3 As Eri and Junko both received two votes at the twelfth tribal council, the number of votes each had received at previous tribal councils were counted. Eri had 0 votes and Junko had 4 votes. Therefore, Junko was eliminated.

^4 In a rule specific to only the Japanese version of Survivor, if a member of the jury believed neither finalist deserved to win, they may refuse to vote. Junko was the only jury member not to vote for either Daisuke or Eri.
