= Norito Yashima =

Japanese actor, TV personality, narrator, voice actor and presenter

Norito Yashima (八嶋 智人, Yashima Norito; born September 27, 1970 in Nara) is a Japanese actor, TV personality, narrator, voice actor and presenter. He is currently employed by ComeCome Miniki-Na Theater Company and SIS Company.

== Career ==
Yashima landed his first hosting job on the Fuji TV series Hey! Spring of Trivia, a show he co-hosted with fellow actor Katsumi Takahashi, and has also participated in a few anime productions, voicing characters such as Iwanbo in Rurouni Kenshin and Œufcoque in Mardock Scramble.

== Family ==
He is married to stage actress Kyōko Miyashita (宮下 今日子, Miyashita Kyōko), and their first son was born on May 12, 2007.

== Filmography ==
=== Film ===
Year	Title	Role	Notes	Ref.
1999	Gamera 3: The Revenge of Iris	Sakurai		
2000	Tales of the Unusual	Man		
2003	Kantoku kansen			
2004	Yaku san-jû no uso	Yokoyama		
2005	Yôgisha: Muroi Shinji	Hideki Haijima		
2006	Rough	Coach Furuya		
2007	Hero	Kenji Endo		
2008	All Around Us	Moroi		
2008	Akifukaki	Satoru Terada		
2016	Rudolf the Black Cat	Butch (voice)		
2018	Killing for The Prosecution	Odajima		
2019	Touken Ranbu	Hashiba Hideyoshi		
2022	Radiation House: The Movie	Fukuo Tanaka		
2024	All of Tokyo!	Kenji Hinuma		
2025	Love Song from Hiroshima	UFO expert		
2025	My Beloved Stranger	Ken'ichi Kasuga		
2026	Goodbye My Car	Kota Yasuda		
2027	School Meals Time: Umasoge Kingdom	Kaname Miyazato		

=== Television ===
Year	Title	Role	Notes	Ref.
2000	Aikotoba wa Yūki	Rei Saitō		
2001	Hero	Kenji Endo		
2002	Hey! Spring of Trivia	Host		
2003	Water Boys	Kiyomasa		
2004	Shinsengumi!	Takeda Kanryuusai	Taiga drama	
2004	Wonderful Life	Masayoshi Tsumasaka		
2008	Scrap Teacher	Hisakimi Takasu		
2010	Wagaya no Rekishi	Shusaku Endo		
2012	Yûsha Yoshihiko to Akuryô no Kagi	Instructor		
2014	Massan	Toshio	Asadora	
2018	Nemuri Kyoshirō The Final	Kinpachi	Television film	
2019	Shiroi Kyotō	Tomohiro Tsukuda		
2021	Radiation House	Fukuo Tanaka	Season 2	
2022	The 13 Lords of the Shogun	Takeda Nobuyoshi	Taiga drama	
2024	Extremely Inappropriate!	Himself		
2026	Extremely Inappropriate! Special	Himself	Television film	
2026	Blossom	Kozo Iwata	Asadora	

=== Anime ===
- Boys Over Flowers (1996) - Lighting Staff
- Rurouni Kenshin (1996) - Iwanbo, Kameo, et al
- Kero Kero Chime (1997) - Poppo, Frog C, Kabayan
- Hatsumei Boy Kanipan (1998) - Kanburi
- Mardock Scramble (2010-2012) - Œufcoque Penteano
- Rudolf the Black Cat (2016) - Buchi
- Dive in Wonderland (2025) - March Hare

=== Video games ===
- Kowloon's Gate (1996) - Mushroom Seller Charlie
- Ni no Kuni: Wrath of the White Witch (2010) - King Tom Tildrum XIV

=== Dubbing ===
- Open Season (2006) - Elliot
- The Good Dinosaur (2016) - Nash
- Dolittle (2020) - Plimpton
