= Survivor Japan: Hokkaido =

- Presented by: Neptune & Munehiro Tokita
- No. of days: 39
- No. of castaways: 16
- Winner: Asami Kawamura
- Runner-up: Sakiko Sekiguchi
- Location: Mikasa, Hokkaido of Japan
- No. of episodes: 11

Release
- Original release: July 2 – September 17, 2002

Season chronology
- ← Previous; Palau Next → Philippines

Survivor Japan: Hokkaido, was the second season of Survivor Japan and it aired from July 2, 2002, to September 17, 2002. This season was set in Mikasa, Hokkaidō of Japan.

The original tribes were named Toytoy (トイトイ, Toitoi) and Wakka (ワッカ, Wakka), and merged tribe was named Nitay (ニタイ, Nitai). In Reward Challenges during the tribal stage of the game, each tribe had to bet specified goods from their tribes camp. The defeated tribe had to give their goods to the winning tribe. Prior to the merge, both tribes had to burn their camp down, and to move to a new camp site. Ultimately, it was convenience store clerk Asami Kawamura won the season by a jury vote of 6–0 over maid Sakiko Sekiguchi.

== Finishing order ==
Contestant	Original Tribe	Merged Tribe	Finish
Nobuki Arai; 30,	Wakka		1st Voted Out; Day 4
Yuzo Ishiyama; 24,	Wakka		Evacuated; Day 5
Hitomi Matsuoka; 29,	Wakka		2nd Voted Out; Day 7
Yoshiaki Yamanaka; 35,	Wakka		3rd Voted Out; Day 10
Fumiko Kawakami; 48,	Toytoy		4th Voted Out; Day 13
Fumio Matsumoto; 43,	Wakka		5th Voted Out; Day 16
Norihiro Araki; 29,	Toytoy		6th Voted Out; Day 19
Mayu Hashiba; 26,	Toytoy	Nitay	Evacuated; Day 22
Takanori Imai; 25,	Toytoy	Nitay	7th Voted Out; 1st Jury Member; Day 23
Miho Mizuta; 18,	Toytoy	Nitay	8th Voted Out; 2nd Jury Member; Day 26
Emiko Matsui; 32,	Wakka	Nitay	9th Voted Out; 3rd Jury Member; Day 29
Koki Iwamoto; 34,	Toytoy	Nitay	10th Voted Out; 4th Jury Member; Day 32
Takako Tatsumi; 29,	Wakka	Nitay	11th Voted Out; 5th Jury Member; Day 36
Yusuke Yuasa; 19,	Toytoy	Nitay	12th Voted Out; 6th Jury Member; Day 38
Sakiko Sekiguchi; 27,	Wakka	Nitay	Runner-Up; Day 39
Asami Kawamura; 22,	Toytoy	Nitay	Sole Survivor; Day 39

== Voting history ==
	Original Tribes							Merged Tribe								
Episode #:	1	2		3	4	5	6	7		8		9		10	Reunion	
Eliminated:	Kiyoshi; 5-2-1	Yuzo; No vote	Hitomi; 5-1	Yoshiaki; 3-2	Fumiko; 6-2	Fumio; 2-2^{1}	Yutaka; 6-1	Mayu; No vote	Takanori; 5-3	Miho; 4-3	Emiko; 4-2	Koki; 3-2	Takako; 3-1	Yusuke; 1-0	Sakiko; 0/6 votes	Asami; 6/6 votes
Voter	Vote															
Asami					Fumiko		Yutaka		Takanori	Takako	Takako	Takako	Takako	Yusuke	Jury Vote	
Sakiko	Kiyoshi		Hitomi	Yoshiaki		Fumio			Takanori	Miho	Emiko	Koki	Takako		Jury Vote	
Yusuke					Fumiko		Yutaka		Emiko	Miho	Emiko	Koki	Takako			Asami
Takako	Kiyoshi		Hitomi	Yoshiaki		Fumio			Emiko	Miho	Emiko	Koki	Asami			Asami
Koki					Fumiko		Yutaka		Takanori	Miho	Emiko	Takako				Asami
Emiko	Kiyoshi		Hitomi	Fumio		Takako			Takanori	Takako	Takako					Asami
Miho					Fumiko		Yutaka		Takanori	Takako						Asami
Takanori					Fumiko		Yutaka		Emiko							Asami
Mayu					Yutaka		Yutaka									
Yutaka					Fumiko		Asami									
Fumio	Kiyoshi		Hitomi	Yoshiaki		Takako										
Fumiko					Yutaka											
Yoshiaki	Kiyoshi		Hitomi	Takako												
Hitomi	Sakiko		Takako													
Yuzo	Fumio															
Kiyoshi	Fumio															

^1 As Fumio and Takako both received two votes at the fifth tribal council, the number of votes each had received at previous tribal councils was taken into account. Takako had two previous votes but Fumio had three, therefore Fumio was eliminated.
