= Twotone Aoki =

Japanese impressionist

Tsutomu Aoki (青木 努, Aoki Tsutomu; born June 27, 1959), better known by his stage name Twotone Aoki (ツートン青木, Tsūton Aoki) is a Japanese impressionist from Kanagawa Prefecture. His son, Ryūji Aoki, is also an impressionist.

== Impression repertoire ==
- Eun-sook Kye
- Keiko Fuji
- Akira Fuse
- Hiromi Go
- Shinji Harada
- Takao Horiuchi
- Takashi Hosokawa
- Kōshi Inaba
- Michael Jackson
- Ryūichi Kawamura
- Yuki Katsuragi
- Saburō Kitajima
- Keisuke Kuwata
- Nobuteru Maeda
- Chiharu Matsuyama
- Yoshikazu Mera
- Hibari Misora
- Yoshinori Monta
- Shinichi Mori
- Yoshizaki Musshu
- Tsuyoshi Nagabuchi
- Kaname Nemoto
- Tomotaka Okamoto
- Judy Ongg
- Masashi Sada
- Hideki Saijō
- Kenji Sawada
- Eiko Segawa
- Masanori Sera
- Kiyomi Suzuki
- Toshihiko Tahara
- Kōji Tamaki
- Masakazu Tamura
- Shinji Tanimura
- Yoshimi Tendō
- Hideaki Tokunaga
- Machiko Watanabe
- Masayoshi Yamazaki
