= Hikari Ōta =

Japanese television comedian (born 1965)

Hikari Ota
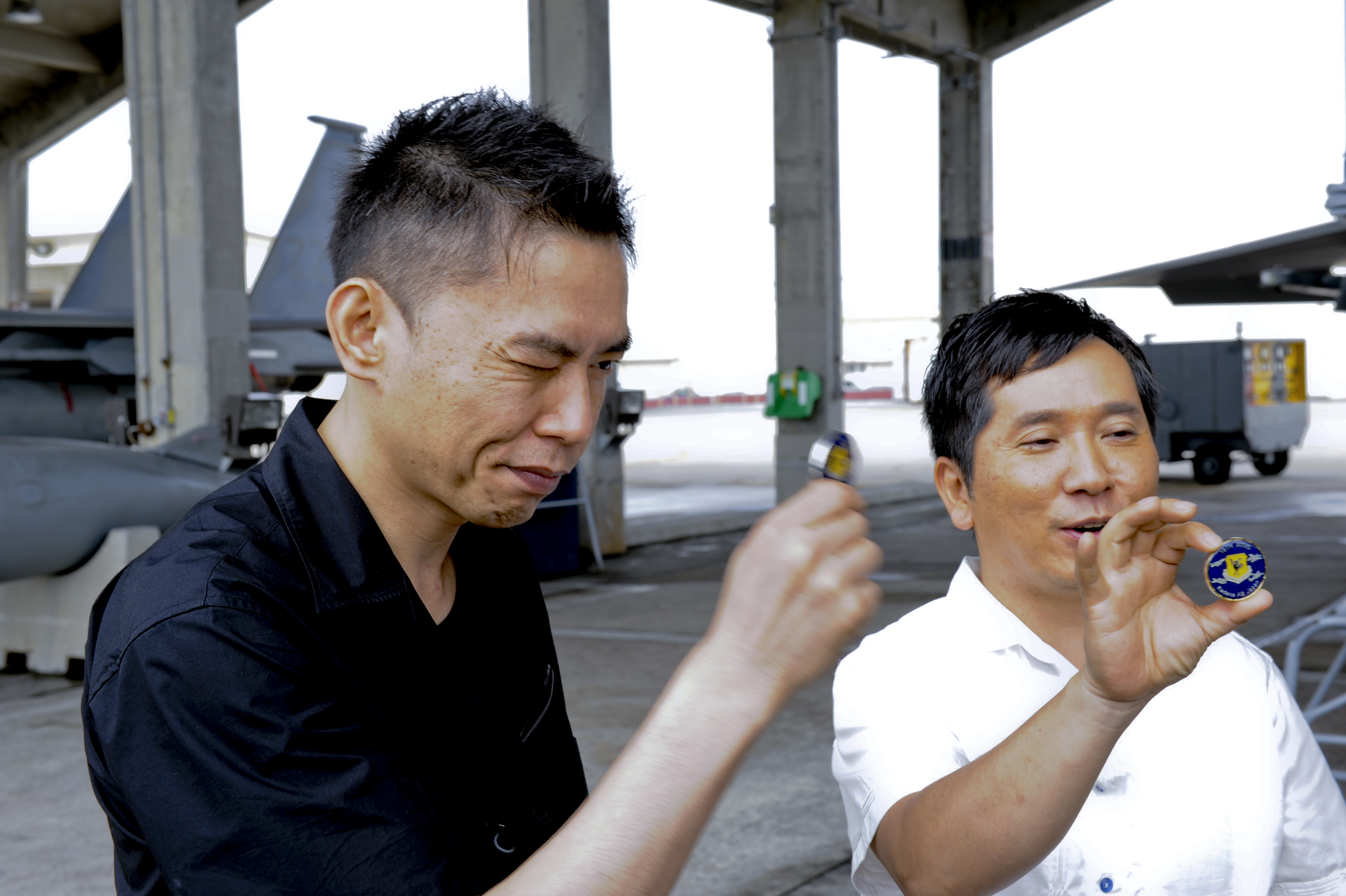
- Hikari Ota (left) and Yuji Tanaka (right) admire coins commemorating Kadena Air Base, in 2012
- Born: May 13, 1965 (age 61); Kamifukuoka, Saitama, Japan
- Spouse: Mitsuyo Ōta (m. 1990)

Comedy career
- Years active: 1988 – present
- Medium: Owarai; Television
- Genre: Owarai

Hikari Ōta (太田 光, Ōta Hikari; born May 13, 1965) is a Japanese television comedian.

He is best known as one half of the owarai duo Bakushō Mondai alongside Yūji Tanaka, where he performs the role of boke. He was born in Kamifukuoka, Saitama.

== Unique character ==
Ōta is known for his long and sometimes rambling speeches, as well as for making provocative or controversial remarks in his performances. As a boke, performers are generally expected to take on a more naive comedic role, but Ōta’s style often extends beyond conventional boundaries and frequently introduces unconventional or controversial elements, prompting Tanaka (as the tsukkomi) to respond and guide the exchange back toward the routine. Ōta is also a bibliophile—reportedly reading more than 100 books a year—and some of his favourite authors include Kurt Vonnegut, John Irving, J. D. Salinger, and Osamu Dazai (of whom Ōta's father was a student). Several of these writers have been associated with styles that resemble his often absurdist outlook.

His views frequently differ from Tanaka's during performances, and he often takes an opposing position as part of their comedic interaction, contributing to the dynamic of their boke/tsukkomi partnership.

He is also an active essayist and has published several collections.

== Literary career ==
In 2010, Ōta published his first work of fiction, a collection of short stories titled Maboroshi no Tori (マボロシの鳥 / Legendary Bird). This was followed by the novel Bunmei no Ko (文明の子 / Child of Civilisation) in 2012.

== Now showing ==
Ōta has appeared as the main speaker on the Nippon TV programme Hikari Ōta's If I Were Prime Minister... Secretary Tanaka, where he takes on the role of the Japanese Prime Minister and discusses various social issues in a comedic format. Guests on the programme often include members of the Japanese Diet and other public figures from different fields.

Ōta also voiced Sid the Sloth in the Japanese dubbed version of the animated franchise Ice Age.

== Filmography ==
=== Television ===
- The Scent of the Wind (2026), Heizo Endo

== Awards ==
| Year | Award | Category | Work(s) | Result |
|---|---|---|---|---|
| 2019 | 61st Blue Ribbon Awards | Best Director | Kuso-yarō to Utsukushiki Sekai | Nominated |
