= Sayako Kuramoto =

Japanese actress (born 1983)

- 倉本 清子
- Born: July 23, 1983 (age 43); Kusatsu, Shiga, Japan
- Other names: Saya Kazuki (和希 沙也, Kazuki Saya): Kazuki-chan (かずきちゃん); Sayacchi (さやっち)
- Occupation: Actress
- Years active: 2001–
- Agents: Horipro; Tom company
- Height: 1.6 m (5 ft 3 in) (2007)
- Spouse: Tomoyuki Kuramoto (m. 2011)

Sayako Kuramoto (倉本 清子, Kuramoto Sayako; born 23 July 1983, in Kusatsu, Shiga, Japan) is a Japanese actress. She is formerly known as Saya Kazuki (和希 沙也, Kazuki Saya).

== Biography ==
Kazuki's career began when she became one of the first phase members of the idol group Hop Club in 2001. In 2002 she was chosen among 15,000 people for Miss Magazine's Grand Prix. Kazuki later moved to Horipro's Tokyo headquarters from Osaka in 2003. She was challenged at directing for Film Factory.

In November 2009, Kazuki's writing debut was the children's mystery novel Uranai × Tantei. She was in charge for the draft, such as the characters and settings, and it was written by a team.

Kazuki married director Tomoyuki Kuramoto in the 3 July 2011. She later left Horipro and in 2014 she returned as an actress and now belongs to Tom company. It was reported that Kazuki had given birth to a girl on the 19 September 2016.

On January 1, 2020, Kazuki announced that she would start working under her real name, Sayako Kuramoto.

== Discography ==
=== Singles ===
Year	Title
2003	"Sutafi no Dai Bōken"

=== Videos ===
Year	Title
2002	Hop Club 1st Video
2002	Hop Club: Jump Up
2002	Miss Magazine 2002: Saya Kazuki
2003	Selfish
2003	friend
2004	Saya Kazuki
2004	Saya Kazuki: Shijō Yūgi
2005	Ashita no Atashi
2006	Tsutaetai Koto

== Filmography ==
=== TV dramas ===
Year	Title	Role	Network	Notes
2004	Hontoni Atta Kowai Hanashi		Fuji TV	
	Himitsuna Okusan		Fuji TV	
2009	Kiina: Fukanō Hanzai Sōsa-kan	Nurse	NTV	
2011	Hancho: Jin'nan-sho Asaka Han	Nurse	TBS	
2011	Case Closed	Ayaka Nizuma	YTV	Episode 4
2013	Saikou no Rikon		Fuji TV	Episode 10
2013	Tank Top Fighter	Yuria	TBS	Episodes 3 and 4
2014	Gokuaku Ganbo	Tsuyako Aizen	Fuji TV	Episode 2
2014	Team: Keishichō Tokubetsu Hanzai Sōsa Honbu	Hitomi Yoshizaki	TV Asahi	Final Episode
2014	Sakamichi no Ie	Tomoko Takahashi	TV Asahi	
2015	Wild Heroes	Natsumi Satoto	NTV	

=== Films ===
Year	Title
	Paradise Paradise
Homeless ga Chūgakusei
2015	ST: Aka to Shiro no Sōsa File

=== TV series ===
Year	Title	Network	Notes
	Pet Dai Shūgō! Pochi-tama	TV Tokyo	Regular appearances
	Akko ni Omakase!	TBS	Quasi-regular appearances
	Appu & Up!	KTV	Quasi-regular appearances
	That's Takarakuji	TBS	Quasi-regular appearances
2003	Future Girls	THK	
2004	Idol Dō	Fuji TV 721	
2004	Shimura Juku	Fuji TV	
2004	Back Drop	NBN	
2004	Quiz! Shinsuke-kun	ABC	Assistant
	Shibuya Deep A	NHK BS-2	
2007	Risatchi	THK	Regular appearances
2007	Shin Kankaku Wakaru Tsukaeru Eibunhō	NHK E	
	mu-Jack	KTV	Jackers reporter
	Maki Mizuno no Mahou no Restauran R	MBS	Quasi-regular monthly appearances
	Benkyō Shite Kimashita Quiz: Gariben	TV Asahi	Quasi-regular appearances
2008	Yume no Tobira: Next Door	TBS	Navigator
2010	Aggressive des kedo, Nanika?	Home	
2010	NHK Kokokoza	NHK E	
2010	Kansai Tokushū	NHK Osaka	
2013	Harajuku Nest Cafe	TBS	

=== Radio ===
Year	Title	Network	Notes
2003	B Friday Special: Jinnai-Ken Koba 45 Radio	MBS Radio	
2004	Penalty no Gokkun de Gozaimas	CBC Radio	
	Yanmaga Densetsu Kyaeen Daan	TBS	
2005	Reco	Deco	Monthly assistant
	Recommen	NCB	Monday appearances
2009	Junji Takada Michiko Kawai no Tokyo Paradise	NCB	

=== Anime television ===
Year	Title	Role	Network
	Kekkaishi	Yurina Kanda	YTV
2005	Kochira Katsushika-ku Kameari Kōenmaehashutsujo	Sapphire Princess	Fuji TV
	DigiGirl	DigiGirl	Kids Station

=== Anime films ===
Year	Title	Role	Ref.
2016	Chieri to Cherry	Keiko	

=== Stage ===
Year	Title
2007	Hanbun Tokyo
2010	2LDK
2011	Tokyo no Sora ni
2011	American Kazoku
2011	Bungaku Seinen
2012	Sukizuki Daisuki Chō Aishiteru

=== Advertisements ===
Year	Title
2007	Tokyo Gas "Gaspacho"
2007	Shiseido "uno Deodorant Spray"

=== Image character ===
Year	Title
2003	All Japan High School Soccer Tournament
2009	Nike PDK Rejoice II
2009	Jōhō Ryūtsū Gyōsei-kyoku Yūsei Gyōsei-bu Shinsho-bin Seido Shūchi-yō poster

=== Video games ===
Title	Notes
Metal Gear Solid 2: Sons of Liberty	Appeared in a poster
Metal Gear Solid 3: Snake Eater	Appeared in magazine Sabra

== Publications ==
=== Photobooks ===
Year	Title
2002	Hop Club 1st Shashin-shū: Step 1
2003	Lip Smile
2003	Voices
2005	Kazukissu

=== Mook ===
Year	Title
2002	Miss Magazine 2002
