= Yuji Tanaka =

Japanese comedian

Yūji Tanaka
- 田中 裕二
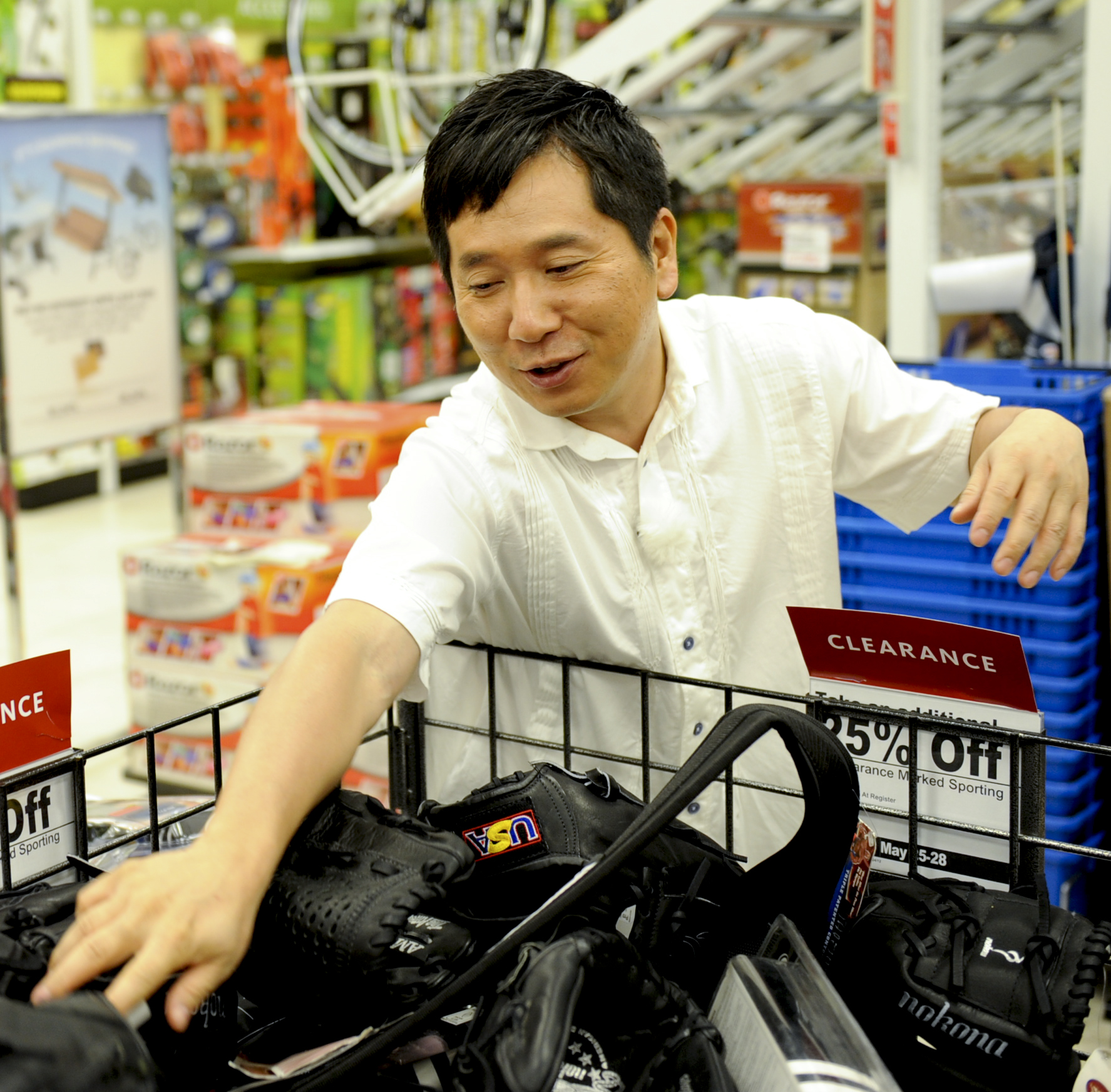
- Tanaka on a tour of Kadena Air Base in 2012
- Born: January 10, 1965 (age 61); Tokyo, Japan
- Occupation: Comedian
- Years active: 1988–present
- Agent: Titan
- Height: 1.54 m (5 ft 1/2 in)
- Spouse: Moe Yamaguchi (m. 2015)

Yūji Tanaka (田中 裕二, Tanaka Yūji; born January 10, 1965 in Nakano, Tokyo) is a Japanese comedian. He is best known as half of the owarai duo Bakusho Mondai along with Hikari Ota. He also played Mike in the Japanese dub of the Pixar movie Monsters, Inc., Br'er Fox in the Japanese dub of the Disney movie Song of the South (special edition), Shaun in the Japanese dubs of Shaun The Sheep Movie and A Shaun The Sheep Movie: Farmaggedon, and Josh Valentine in the Japanese dub of Godzilla vs. Kong. Tanaka was diagnosed with testicular cancer in 2000, but was successfully treated following surgery.
