= Fujiwara (comedy duo) =

Japanese comedy duo

- Employer: Yoshimoto Kōgyō

Comedy career
- Years active: 1989–
- Members: Toshifumi Fujimoto (Tsukkomi); Takayuki Haranishi (Boke)

Notes
- Same year/generation as: Chihara Kyodai; Buffalo Goro

Fujiwara (stylized in all caps) is a Japanese comedy duo (kombi) consisting of Toshifumi Fujimoto (藤本 敏史) and Takayuki Haranishi (原西 孝幸). They are from Osaka, but are currently primarily active in Tokyo and, like most other comedians originating the Kansai region, are employed by Yoshimoto Kōgyō.

== Members ==
- Toshifumi Fujimoto (藤本 敏史, Fujimoto Toshifumi) Born December 18, 1970 in Neyagawa, Osaka. Plays the tsukkomi. Also known as Fujimon (フジモン). Known for his large face, a running joke is to have someone say, "Is it just me or does this studio feel small?" to which he responds, "It's because my face is huge." Fujimoto is known as a rowdy-type character and is usually cast in variety shows as such. He was married to model and tarento Yukina Kinoshita from 2010 to 2019. The pair divorced on December 31, 2019.
- Takayuki Haranishi (原西 孝幸, Haranishi Takayuki) Born March 5, 1971 in Neyagawa, Osaka. Plays the boke. His main shtick is delivering one-liner jokes, of which he claims to have 200. His gags often consist of puns and are usually accompanied by absurd gestures. He is often compared to a gorilla in a comedic sense due to his facial features.

== Overview ==
- The name Fujiwara comes from their names, "Fuji"moto and "Hara"nishi, which when put together is pronounced Fujiwara. When the duo was first formed, they used the kanji "藤原", but later changed it to the English spelling of Fujiwara.
- Fujimoto writes all of the duo's material and routines except for the solo gags that Haranishi performs.
- After their marriage in 2010, Fujimoto alongside ex-wife Yukina Kinoshita became one of the most well known entertainer couples in the industry. They appeared several times together on programs such as Monitoring. The couple divorced in December of 2019.

== Shows ==
=== Hosted shows ===
- Fujiyama Star (フジヤマ☆スタア) (Kansai TC, since 2007)
- Fujiken (フジケン) (SKY PerfecTV!, since 2004)

=== Semi-regular shows ===
Fujiwara are regular guests on the following shows:

- Akashiya-san Channel (明石家さんちゃんねる) (TBS, since 2006)
- Quiz! Hexagon II (クイズ!ヘキサゴンII) (Fuji Television, since 2006)
- LINCOLN (リンカーン) (TBS, since 2005)
- Mecha-Mecha Iketeru! (めちゃ²イケるッ!) (Fuji Television, since 1996)

=== Guest appearances ===
- Smile PreCure! (Appearance in episode 17, 2012)
