= Bakushō Mondai =

Japanese comedy duo

- Bakushō Mondai (爆笑問題)
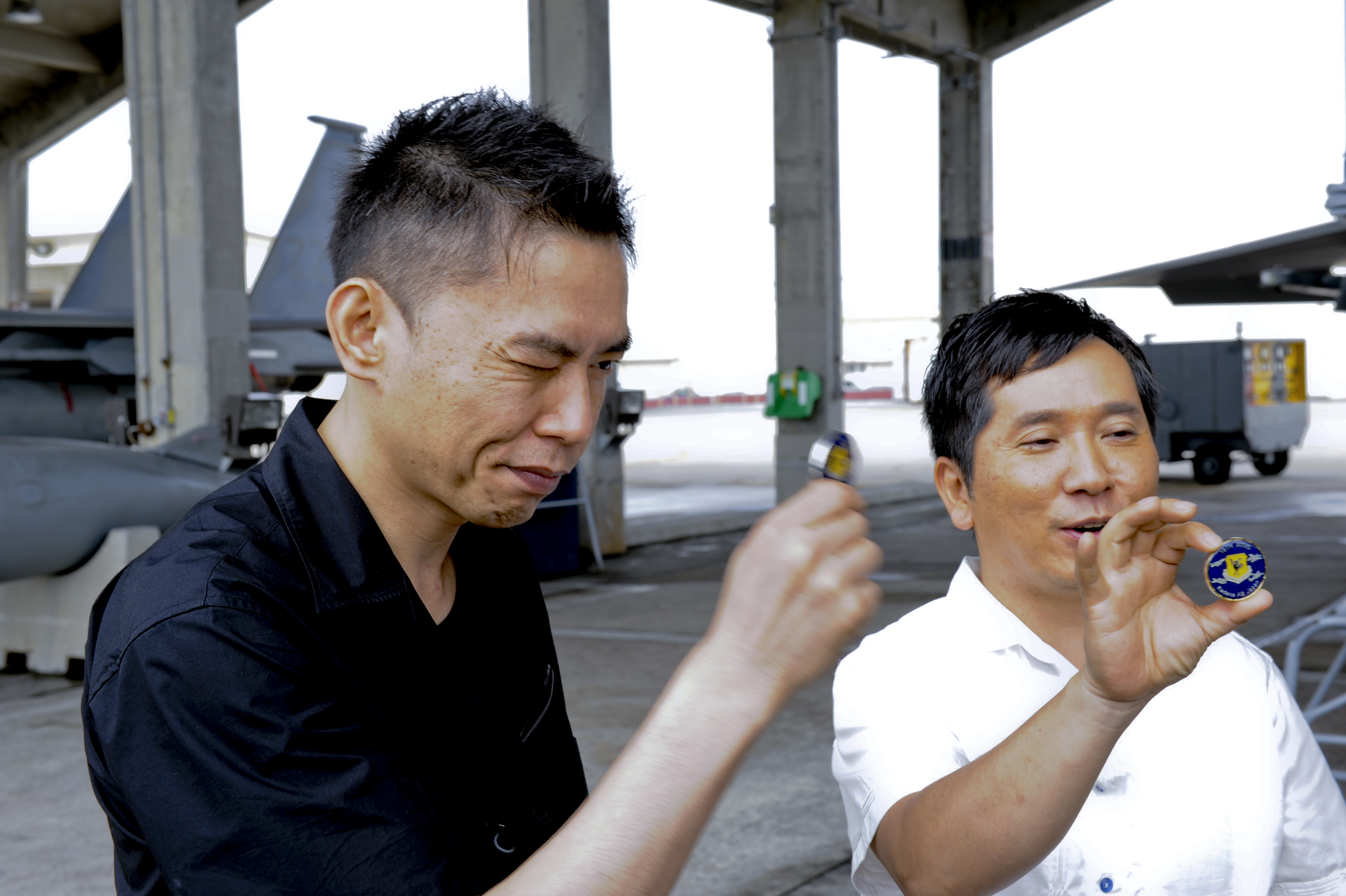
- Hikari Ota (left) and Yuji Tanaka (right) admire coins commemorating Kadena Air Base, in 2012
- Employer(s): Titan Co., Ltd

Comedy career
- Years active: 1988– (formed in Tokyo)
- Members: Yūji Tanaka (Tsukkomi); Hikari Ōta (Boke)

Notes
- Same year/generation as: Summers; Hosei Tsukitei; Honjamaca

Bakushō Mondai (爆笑問題) is a Japanese comedy duo consisting of Yūji Tanaka and Hikari Ōta under the entertainment agency, Titan Inc. The comedians first met when they were students in the Department of Fine Arts at Nihon University, and they formed Bakushō Mondai in 1988 after dropping out of school. The name of the duo means literally "burst into/roaring laughter", "problem/question". The tsukkomi of the two, Tanaka, had a testicle removed because of testicular cancer, and this frequently elicits jokes by the group's boke, Ōta, as well as other personalities that they may be performing with. Ōta is generally the higher profile of the two, and frequently dominates shows that they host with his long-winded speeches.

From August 1995 through November 1997, Bakushō Mondai was involved with the broadcasting of a number of SoundLink Magazines and Games to owners of the Nintendo Satellaview system:

- "King of After School" (放課後の王様, Hōkago no Ōsama) - SoundLink Magazine (3 days per week between August 1995 - March 1996)
- "Bakushō Mondai Silicon Neighborhood Association" (爆笑問題のシリコン町内会, Bakushō Mondai no Shirikon Chounaikai) - SoundLink Magazine (April 1996 - March 1997)
- StarPirates Assault: Bakushō Mondai Edition (爆笑問題の突撃スターパイレーツ, Bakushō Mondai no Totsugeki Sutapairetsu) - SoundLink Game (June 1997 - November 1997)

The duo currently host many variety and quiz shows, as well as commenting on the occasional radio broadcast. Since 2006, the comedy duo has performed an annual manzai act at the end of each year, where they discuss recent events and news from the past year. This performance, called Bakushō Mondai Two Shot (爆笑問題のツーショット), is broadcast on the Wowow channel.

== Awards ==
In 2006, Bakushō Mondai won an "Art Encouragement" award from the Minister of Education, Culture, Sports, Science and Technology recognizing them as facets of modern Japanese culture. They have also won various other awards in the past, including the Golden Arrow award for entertainment in 1997.
