= Chihara Kyōdai =

Japanese comedian duo

- Chihara Kyōdai (千原兄弟)
- Employer: Yoshimoto Kogyo

Comedy career
- Years active: 1990–
- Genre: Conte
- Members: Chihara Seiji (Tsukkomi); Chihara Junior (Boke)

Notes
- Same year/generation as: Fujiwara; Buffalo Goro

Chihara Kyōdai (千原兄弟, Chihara Kyōdai) or Chihara Brothers is a Japanese comedy duo (kombi) consisting of Chihara Junior (千原ジュニア) and Chihara Seiji (千原せいじ). Seiji and Junior are actual brothers. They are employed by Yoshimoto Kogyo, and are mainly active in Tokyo and Osaka. They have featured in films and television.

The duo formed in June 1989 when Seiji invited Junior, who dropped out of high school at the time to form a unit and become comedians at the Yoshimoto NSC in Osaka. The duo started official activities in 1990.

== Members ==
- Chihara Junior (千原ジュニア), Real name Kōji Chihara (千原浩史) Born March 30, 1974 in Fukuchiyama, Kyoto. Plays the boke and writes all their material.
- Chihara Seiji (千原せいじ), Real name Seiji Chihara (千原靖史) Born January 25, 1970 in Fukuchiyama, Kyoto. Plays the tsukkomi.

== Media ==
This list consists of only media appearances made by the duo Chihara Kyōdai when they appear together.

=== Current Television Programs ===
- Sekai no Mura de Hakken! Konna Tokoro ni Nihonjin (世界の村で発見!こんなところに日本人) (TV Asahi, 2013–)

=== Commercials ===
- Shige Kicks (シゲキックス) (Mikakuto, 1994)
- "Graduation Trip" Campaign (Nippon Travel Agency, 1994)
- Uniqlo (1995)
- "Butayaki Udon" (Acecook, 1995)
- Toyota Rush (Toyota, 2008)
- Willcom, 2011

=== Movies ===
- Kishiwada Shounen Gurentai (岸和田少年愚連隊) (Director: Takashi Miike, 1997)
- Moon Child (Original: Gackt, 2003)
- Street Fighter: The Legend of Chun-Li (Voice-over dub, 2009)
