= Jun Nagura =

Japanese comedian

- 名倉 潤
- Born: 4 November 1968 (age 57); Himeji, Hyōgo, Japan
- Other names: Jun-chan; Leader
- Occupations: Comedian; actor; businessman
- Years active: 1986–present
- Agent: Watanabe Entertainment
- Television: Shin Kankaku Game: Questa; Egura Kaiun-dō; Honne no Dendō!! Shinsuke ni hawa karumai'
- Height: 1.7 m (5 ft 7 in)
- Spouse: Marina Watanabe (m. 2005)
- Partners: Taizo Harada; Ken Horiuchi

Notes
- Same year/generation as: Ameagari Kesshitai; Gokuraku Tombo

Jun Nagura (名倉 潤, Nagura Jun; born 4 November 1968, in Himeji, Hyōgo, Japan) is a Japanese comedian, actor and businessman who is the leader of the comedy trio Neptune and in charge of tsukkomi. He is nicknamed Jun-chan (潤ちゃん) and Leader (リーダー, Rīdā).

Nagura is represented by Watanabe Entertainment. He is married to Marina Watanabe and is left-handed. The couple has two children, a son and a daughter. Nagura is the youngest of four brothers

== Filmography ==
These lists below only feature Nagura as an individual.

To see him as part of the comedy trio, see Neptune (owarai).

=== Current appearances ===
Year	Title	Network
2012	Yoso de Iwan to I-tei: Koko dake no Hanashi ga Kikeru (Hi) Ryōtei	TV Tokyo
2016	World Sports MLB	NHK BS-1

=== Irregular appearances ===
Title	Network
Sekai no Hikyō de Daihakken! Nihon Shokudō	TV Tokyo

=== Former appearances ===
Title	Network	Notes
Shinkeishitsu Variety: Shinpai-san	TV Tokyo	
Tsuboya Yohei	NTV	
Bakushō Mondai no Baku Ten!	TBS	
Egura Kaiun-dō	TV Tokyo	
Ques Five	TV Tokyo	
Good Lookin' Club	NTV	
21 Seiki Edison	TBS	
Otona no Shikaku	NTV	
Honne no Dendō!! Shinsuke ni hawa karumai'	Fuji TV	
Kudamaki Hachibee	TV Tokyo	
Shin Kankaku Game: Questa	NHK-G	Presenter

=== One-off ===
Title	Network	Notes
Commu kan	Fuji TV	
Studio Park kara konnichiwa	NHK-G	Guest
Chō! Kō! Sugo! Mune! Kore Mireba 1000% Kanzen Kōryaku Tokyo Skytree SP	TBS	As president

=== TV drama ===
Year	Title	Role	Network	Notes
1989	Abunai Deka		NTV	Episode 22
2002	Remote	Yusuke Otaguro	NTV	
2011	Kyōgū	Toshiyuki Shimoda	ABC	
2016	Beppinsan	Shozo Nogami	NHK	Asadora
2020	Ochoyan	Sōsuke Okada	NHK	Asadora

=== Advertisements ===
Year	Title	Notes
2006	Suntory Vitamin Water "2-Ri sokkuri"	Co-starring with Yoku Hata and Mokomichi Hayami
2006	Vitamin Water "Hata Kawarazu"	Co-starring with Yoku Hata and Mokomichi Hayami
2007	Ōtsuka Chilled Shokuhin Yasai no Senshi	First advert co-starring with his wife Marina Watanabe
2013	Suntory Iemon "Nagura Fusai no Mi"	Co-starring with his wife Marina Watanabe
