= Neptune (owarai) =

Japanese conte group

- Nepuchūn (ネプチューン)
- Employer: Watanabe Entertainment

Comedy career
- Years active: 1994–
- Genre: Conte
- Members: Jun Nagura (Tsukkomi); Taizo Harada (Boke); Ken Horiuchi (Boke)

Neptune (ネプチューン, Nepuchūn) is a three-man Japanese conte group consisting of two boke, Taizo Harada (原田 泰造, Harada Taizō), and Ken Horiuchi (堀内 健, Horiuchi Ken) – usually referred to as Horiken (ホリケン), and one tsukkomi, Jun Nagura (名倉 潤, Nagura Jun). Their trio name comes from the Kinnikuman character, Neptuneman.

The group debuted with Ohta Production back in 1994 but is currently with the talent agency Watanabe Entertainment.

One of Neptune's most popular yet controversial sections was "Nep Throw", where Harada played the role of a myōjin deity and "blessed" volunteers by throwing them with a tomoe nage, which would supposedly make their wishes come true. The participants where often young women, whose underwear could become comically exposed by the throw.

== Members ==
- Jun Nagura (名倉潤) – Born November 4, 1968 in Himeji, Hyōgo. Plays the tsukkomi.
- Taizō Harada (原田泰造) – Born March 24, 1970 in Hiroshima, Hiroshima Prefecture. Plays the boke.
- Ken Horiuchi (堀内健) – Born November 28, 1969 in Yokosuka, Kanagawa. Plays the boke.
