= Peanuts (2006 film) =

- Directed by: Teruyoshi Uchimura
- Written by: Teruyoshi Uchimura; Shoichi Masiko
- Produced by: Kei Haruna; Haruna Yorokoshi
- Starring: Teruyoshi Uchimura; Masakazu Mimura
- Cinematography: Sôhei Tanikawa
- Edited by: Takuya Taguchi
- Music by: Ryô Fukawa
- Distributed by: Comstock
- Release date: January 28, 2006
- Running time: 115 minutes
- Country: Japan
- Language: Japanese

Peanuts (ピーナッツ) is a 2006 Japanese baseball comedy film written and directed by Teruyoshi Uchimura.

== Plot ==
Koichi Akiyoshi, a former third baseman for the grass baseball team Peanuts, sets out to rebuild the team after it has become less successful. The Peanuts compete against other teams amid the redevelopment of the city where the captain and Sagara live.

== Cast ==
- Koichi Akiyoshi – 秋吉光一 (sportswriter): Teruyoshi Uchimura
- Kazuo Sagara – 相良和雄 (wine shop storekeeper): Masakazu Mimura (Summers)
- Masaki Fumino – 文野正樹 (man who runs from a debt collector): Kazuki Ōtake (Summers)
- Ittetsu Katsuta – 勝田一鉄 (small restaurant owner, former ace pitcher): Golgo Matsumoto (TIM)
- Noboru Akaiwa – 赤岩登 (slugger of a childcare provider): Red Yoshida (TIM)
- Ryoichi Miyamoto – 宮本良一 (record shop manager): Ryō Fukawa
- Miyuki Kusano – 草野みゆき (daughter of director of PEANUTS, Tsutomu Kusano): Megumi Sato
- Haruo Akiyama – 秋山ハルオ (the laundry's eldest son): Kazuki Iio (Zun)
- Natsuo Akiyama – 秋山ナツオ (the laundry's second son)：Tadahiro Aoki
- Akio Akiyama – 秋山アキオ (the laundry's third son)：Masataka Fijisige
- Tsutomu Kusano – 草野務 (chairperson in business and industry, director of PEANUTS): Bengal
- Mariko Sagara – 相良まりこ (wife of Kazuo Sagara): Hiroko Nakajima
- Siori Sagara – 相良しおり (daughter of Kazuo Sagara)： Nana Yamauchi
- Akane Akaiwa – 赤岩アカネ (wife of Noboru Akaiwa )：Kaoru Okunuki
- Toscania Katsuta – 勝田トスカーニャ (wife of Ittetsu Katsuta): Adeyto (Laura Windrath)
- Yuriko Miyajina – 宮島百合子 (lover of Koichi Akiyoshi): Sachiko Sakurai
- Kenji Osak – 大崎健二 (president of Towa new town development): Sugemitsu Ogi
- Takeshi Shibuya – 渋谷武志 (employee of Towa new town): Yūki Matsumura
- Mr. Tanaka – 田中 (supervisor of the NewTowns): Kō Takasugi
- Fujinoki – 藤ノ木 (NewTowns' pitcher): Manabu Hamada
- Sugimoto – 杉本 ( NewTowns' catcher): Yūsuke Kamiji
- Parents of Ryoichi Miyamoto – 宮本良一の両親: Real parents of Ryo Fukawa
- Baron chin – あご男爵 (a job-hopping part-timer): Teppei Arita (Cream Stew)
- Shūji Sonobe – 園部修二 (senior and charge editor of Akiyoshi): Masato Irie
- Miki – ミキ (former wife of Masaki Fumino): Tomoko Nakajima (Othello)
- Police officer – 警官: Taizō Harada (Neptune)
- Sports shop visitor – スポーツショップの客: Udo Suzuki (Kyaiin)
- Station employee – 駅員: Tetsurō Degawa
- Bar visitor – 飲み屋の客: Naoto Takenaka

== Theme song ==
- No Plan performing "Kimi no naka no Shonen" (君の中の少年, A heart like a boy in you) from the album Last Plan.
