= Uchimura Produce =

Japanese television series

Uchimura Produce (内村プロデュース), produced by Teruyoshi Uchimura, is a Japanese TV comedy program that aired from 2000 to 2005 on TV Asahi.

== Summary ==
The program that Teruyoshi Uchimura produces shows things with an original technique and concept every week.

There were only two regular performers: Uchimura and Ryō Fukawa at first. Later, a lot of young comedians appeared on the show, and Masakazu Mimura (Summers) became a regular.

This program was the stepping stone for the band consisting of Uchimura, Summers, TIM, and Ryō Fukawa, called NO PLAN. They released a single/DVD. NO PLAN had a live broadcast from Nakano Sunplaza in May 2004 and became successful.

This TV program was popular mainly with young men but finished regular broadcastings on September 26, 2005 as a result of TV Asahi reorganizing its late-night programs.

After the announcement to discontinue the program, demands for its continuation rushed into the official homepage. From the size of the reaction, Teruyoshi Uchimura posted a comment about the program's end on a homepage. Now, it sometimes is broadcast as a special program called "Uchimura Produce Special".

The DVD "Uchimura Produce ～Souseiki～"(内村プロデュース ～創世紀～, Uchimura Produce ～Creation period～) which contained episodes from the early period of the program in Japan was released on January 18, 2006 and jumped directly to first place first on the Oricon chart.

The movie PEANUTS, Uchimura' first directed movie, and in which a lot of performers from this TV program appeared, was released on January 28, 2006.

== Performers ==
=== Regular performers ===
- Producer / Teruyoshi Uchimura(内村光良)
- Ryō Fukawa(ふかわりょう)
- Masakazu Mimura(Summers)(三村マサカズ(さまぁ～ず))

=== Associate regular performers ===
- Kazuki Ōtake(Summers)(大竹一樹(さまぁ～ず))
- TIM(‐)
  - Golgo Matsumoto(ゴルゴ松本)
  - Red Yoshida(レッド吉田)

=== Other appearances ===
- Tetsurō Degawa (出川哲朗)
- Hiroiki Ariyoshi (有吉弘行)
- Parachute Butai (パラシュート部隊)
  - Yū Saitō (斉藤優)
  - Pepe Yano (矢野ペペ)
- Monkikky (モンキッキー)
- Akimasa Haraguchi (原口あきまさ)
- Zun (ずん)
  - Kazuki Iio (飯尾和樹)
  - Yasu (やす)
- Masahiro Sagane (×-GUN→cyōhankorokoro)(さがね正裕 (×-GUN・現丁半コロコロ))
- Teppei Arita (Cream Stew) (有田哲平(くりぃむしちゅー))
- ShinagawaShōji (品川庄司)
  - Hiroshi Sinagawa (品川祐)
  - Tomoharu Shōji (庄司智春)
- Ryūhei Ueshima (Dacyou Club) (上島竜兵(ダチョウ倶楽部))
- Teruyuki Tsuchida (土田晃之)
- Yoiko (よゐこ)
  - Masaru Hamaguchi (濱口優)
  - Shinya Arino (有野晋哉)
- Bananaman (バナナマン)
  - Yūki Himura (日村勇紀)
  - Osamu Shitara (設楽統)
- Ogiyahagi (おぎやはぎ)
  - Hiroaki Ogi (小木博明)
  - Ken Yahagi (矢作兼)
- Untouchable (アンタッチャブル)
  - Hironari Yamazaki (山崎弘也)
  - Hidetsugu Shibata (柴田英嗣)
- Cunning (カンニング)
  - Takanori Takeyama (竹山隆範)
  - Tadayuki Nakashima (中島忠幸)
- Jicho Kacho (次長課長)
  - Jun'ichi Kōmoto (河本準一)
  - Satoshi Inoue (井上聡)
- Impulse (インパルス)
  - Toshiyuki Itakura (板倉俊之)
  - Atsushi Tsutsumishita (堤下敦)
- Dandy Sakano (ダンディ坂野)

etc...

=== TV program assistants ===
- Megumi Yasu (安めぐみ)
- Fumina Hara (原史奈)
- Azusa Yamamoto (山本梓)

etc...

== See also ==
- NO PLAN
- PEANUTS
