= Teruyoshi Uchimura =

Japanese comedian

- 内村 光良
- Born: July 22, 1964 (age 61); Hitoyoshi, Kumamoto, Japan
- Occupation: Comedian
- Years active: 1985–present
- Agent: Maseki Geinosha
- Spouse: Yumi Tokunaga (m. 2005)
- Children: 2

Teruyoshi Uchimura (内村 光良, Uchimura Teruyoshi), half of the Japanese comedy duo Ucchan Nanchan, is one of the most famous and influential comedians in the owarai community. His nickname is Ucchan ("Wutchan"), and his partner, Kiyotaka Nanbara, is known as Nanchan. He was born on July 22, 1964, in Hitoyoshi, Kumamoto. Though he has worked for years as a comedian, he has also shown talent as an actor and dramatic performer. He is well known as the leader of the owarai band NO PLAN.

== History ==
Uchimura met Nanbara while attending the Yokohama Broadcasting Technical School, along with Tetsurō Degawa and Masato Irie, who were also classmates. The two decided to start a manzai duo, and they were called Utchan Nanchan by their teacher, Keiko Utsumi. They first appeared on the show Owarai sutaa tanjō!! (お笑いスター誕生!!, Birth of a Comedy Star!). They won the competition the following year, and picked up the nyū kombi (new duo) award the next year.

In 1992, Utchan Nanchan won the Japanese Academy Award for "Best New Actors" for their roles in the movie Cult Seven (七人のおたく). In 1993 Hong Kong singer Wong Ka Kui died after both he and Uchimura fell off a broken stage on Utchan Nanchan TV show. In addition, the TV program Uchimura Produce (内村プロデュース) which he was the producer of in 2000 won popularity. Criticisms followed that the Japanese were having too many late night shows of this type, and the TV station crews were overworked.

Uchimura announced his engagement to and married former TV announcer Yumi Tokunaga in 2005. On January 28, 2006, his debut film as a director, PEANUTS, was released.

== Character ==
Uchimura is said to have been often teased about his pallid skin color and big nose. He was supposedly often teased as a youth with taunts like, "With skin as white as yours, why don't you become a kabuki actor?". At the same time, he was called a child prodigy after placing 8th in a local prefectural swimming tournament, leading his school's softball team to a municipal semifinal win, while also competing in baseball and kendo.

He loves the countryside in his hometown prefecture of Kumamoto, and frequently appears on local television, and writes articles for his hometown newspaper twice a year. He is said to resemble Jackie Chan and has parodied him many times in comedy routines. Therefore, he is called "Chan"("chen") by Tetsurō Degawa.

== Filmography ==
=== Film ===
- Leave My Girl Alone (1986) – Fisherman
- Kisarazu Cat's Eye: Nihon Series (2003) – George Murata
- Zebraman (2004) – Ippongi
- Crayon Shin-chan: The Storm Called: The Kasukabe Boys of the Evening Sun (2004) – Himself (voice)
- Peanuts (2006) – Koichi Akiyoshi
- Gold Medal Man (2016)
- trapezium (2024) – Shūichi Itami

=== Television drama ===
- Saiyūki (2006) – Sha Wujing
- Natsuzora (2019) – narrator

=== Japanese dub ===
- Sing (2017) – Buster Moon
- Sing 2 (2022) – Buster Moon

=== Programs ===
- Everyone's Best Kouhaku 100th Anniversary of Broadcasting Special (NHK, 2025) (host)

== See also ==
- Uchimura Produce
- PEANUTS
- Summers
- TIM
- Ryō Fukawa
- Udo Suzuki (Kyaeen)
