= Ryonosuke Hirama =

Ryonosuke Hirama 平間 亮之介
- Origin: Tokyo, Japan
- Genres: Electronica; Jazz; pop; experimental; world
- Occupations: Musician; composer; arranger; record producer; pianist; Keyboard player
- Instruments: piano; Keyboard; melodica
- Years active: 1998–present
- Labels: Columbia; Universal

Ryonosuke Hirama (平間 亮之介, Hirama Ryōnosuke) is a Japanese musician, composer, arranger, record producer, pianist and keyboard player, based in Tokyo and Karuizawa.

== Career ==
Hirama works on advertisement film and soundtrack, producing original albums, offering songs for various artists, and playing instruments at recordings and lives. Hirama is a central member of tangerine. which is a record producing group. He co-starred with a former erhu player from the Twelve Girls Band as a producer and a pianist at a concert held in Karuizawa 2016 and 2017. Hiramas recent work is a song called Blue Star by The Idolmaster (Dancin' Blue, 2017). The song was introduced as a live performance in front of a 10,000 person audience at a 2018 New Year concert held at Makuhari Messe Chiba, Japan.

== Discography ==
Total Production

- Flavor Bossa Case (2006)
- Flavor Bossa Case II (2006)
- FLAVOR BOSSA CASE ORANGE STYLE (2007)
- FLAVOR BOSSA CASE SAKURA (2008)
- FLAVOR BOSSA CASE TEARS (2008)
- Login! (2009)
- Plugin! (2009)
- SPRING SWEET LOVE (2010)
- Flavor Bossa Case BEST OF GROOVE STYLE (2011)
- Flavor Bossa Case BEST OF MELLOW STYLE (2011)

Collaborations

- Twilight Flavour (2005)
- Aperitivo TOKYO (2006)
- In The Morning BEST (2006)
- Flavor Bossa Case BEST OF MELLOW and GROOVE (2007)
- ViVi HOLIDAY STYLE selected by LENA FUJII (2008)
- PLAY LOUD (2008)
- memories...cafe & drive music (2009)
- COLORFUL HARVEST (2009)
- HOMMAGE Bossa Style non stop mix (2011)

== Other appearances ==
- Lia
  - Shakou no oka (gift, 2005) composed, arranged
  - SANDSTORM (new moon, 2008) composed
- animation soundtrack
  - Curtain, heavenly bird (amaenaideyo!! kyarason DE katsu!!, 2006) composed, arranged
- NO PLAN Uchimura Produce
  - CD-jingle (LAST PLAN, 2006) composed・arranged
- super hero TV show soundtrack
  - time police Vecker Signa ending theme (2007) arranged
- Ai Nonaka
  - koi no musium (2007) composed, arranged
- Yui Horie
  - lovely everyday (2008) arranged
- COLDFEET
  - TEN remixes(2009年) co-remix
- TORTURED SOUL
  - TORTURED SOUL REMIXES JAPAN EDITION (2009) co- remix
- Lena Fujii
  - Rainbow (2009) composed・arranged, produced
- Ayane
  - Megane na Riyu (Megane na Kanojo ending theme, 2010) composed, arranged
- KARA
  - Only for You (Super Girl, 2011) composed, arranged
- KARA
  - Only for You (Super Girl JAPAN TOUR Special Edition, 2012) composed, arranged
- Summers
  - Summers LIVE 9 soundtrack (2013) composed, arranged
- real
  - LOVE CRAZY (2013) co- remix
- Unfamiliar Friends Party
  - SILENCE IS GHOST (2013) co- remix
- tupera tupera
  - picture book UNKO SHIRITORI promotion video (2014) composed, arranged, vocal
- YOSHIKA
  - MY ANTHEM ~Sympathetic Resonance~ (2014) co- remix
- Hanae
  - SHOW GIRL (2016) arranged, piano
- Summers
  - Summers LIVE 11 soundtrack (2017) composed, arranged
- E-kids
  - E-kids Again 1234 Japan Edition (2017) produced, co- composed, arranged
- kukatachii
  - Business of you (Inside, 2017) remix
- The Idolmaster
  - BLUE STAR (2017) composed, arranged
- Iris
  - Ashitae (Gundam Build Divers ending theme, 2018) composed

== Advertisement films ==
- Seven & i Holdings Co., Ltd. Seven & i Holdings company sound logo
- SMBC Consumer Finance Co., Ltd. "It's Promise" company sound logo
- Honda Motor (China) Co., Ltd. "FUNTEC" company sound logo
- Domino's Pizza Japan, Inc. "Domino's Pizza" company sound logo
