= Shabekuri 007 =

- Japanese: しゃべくり007
- Genre: Talk show Variety
- Directed by: Mami Fujimori
- Presented by: Shinya Ueda (Cream Stew)
- Starring: Cream Stew (Teppei Arita, Shinya Ueda); Neptune (Jun Nagura, Ken Horiuchi, Taizo Harada); Tutorial (Yoshimi Tokui, Mitsunori Fukuda)
- Narrated by: Ralph Suzuki (NTV announcer)
- Opening theme: James Bond Theme

Production
- Executive producer: Akihiro Kawanabe
- Producers: Tsuyoshi Yoshimuta, Sayoko Iwasaki
- Running time: 54 minutes
- Production company: Nippon TV

Original release
- Network: NNS (NTV)
- Release: July 12, 2008

Shabekuri 007 (しゃべくり007, Shabekuri Sebun) is a Japanese talk and variety television show featuring seven high-profile comedians alongside different guests each week with little to no scripts, produced and aired on Nippon TV. The show uses no scripts for the free talk portion and is entirely improvised by the host, the regulars and the guests.

== Summary ==
Shabekuri 007 began airing in 2008 in the 30 minute slot on Saturdays at 7:30pm. The initial two months were a success, moving the program to Monday and extending the broadcast time to 1 hour from 10pm to 11pm.

The show features 7 comedians from 3 comedy units of Neptune, Cream Stew and Tutorial, usually hosted and MC'd by Shinya Ueda of Cream Stew. The show features guests every week as the main topic and focus, the guests are mainly celebrities that are currently in topic or are promoting entertainment they are featured in such as an upcoming movie.

The main difference between Shabekuri 007 as a talk show and other talk shows in Japan is that the program uses no scripts for free talk. The conversation is carried by the comedians and the guests through improvisation. Although the main topics and segments of the show is often structured, due to the nature of having no scripts, the conversation would often go off topic.

Shabekuri 007 is one of the most popular programs airing in Japan, with viewership ratings hovering around 10% in the Kanto region.
