= Hirama =

Hirama (written: 平間) is a Japanese surname. Notable people with the surname include:

- Naomichi Hirama (平間 直道, born 1987), Japanese footballer
- Ryonosuke Hirama (平間 亮之介), Japanese musician and composer
- Tomokazu Hirama (平間 智和, born 1977), Japanese footballer

== See also ==
- Hirama Station, a railway station in Kanagawa Prefecture, Japan
