= Hiroyuki Amano =

Japanese comedian and actor

- 天野 ひろゆき
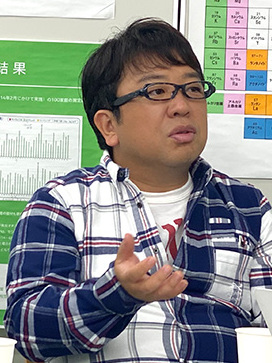
- Born: 24 March 1970 (age 56); Okazaki, Aichi, Japan
- Other name: Amanocchi
- Education: Nihon University College of International Relations
- Occupations: Comedian; film director; film critic; actor; voice actor
- Years active: 1991–
- Agent: Asai Kikaku
- Notable work: B5; Cage; Ichi Oku no Neko
- Style: Manzai; conte (tsukkomi)
- Television: Umai'!; Tokyo Hi-Imagine; Premier no Sōkutsu; Manganogenba; Suka Para
- Spouse: Chisato Arai (m. 2014)
- Partner: Udo Suzuki
- Children: 1
- Website: Official website

Hiroyuki Amano (天野 ひろゆき, 天野 博之, Amano Hiroyuki; born 24 March 1970, in Okazaki, Aichi) is a Japanese comedian, actor, voice actor, television presenter, film director and film critic. He is nicknamed Amanocchi (天野っち). He performs tsukkomi and make stories in the comedy duo Kyaeen. His partner is Udo Suzuki.

Amano is represented with Asai Kikaku. He graduated from Okazaki City South Junior High School, Aichi University of Education University High School and Nihon University College of International Relations International Cultural Department (now International Liberal Arts Department).

== Filmography ==
=== Variety and information programmes ===
==== Current ====
Year	Title	Notes	Ref.
2022–23	Onishi Hiroto's Basic English Recipe (大西泰斗の英会話☆定番レシピ)	Student	

=== TV drama ===
Year	Title	Role	Notes	Ref.
2023	What Will You Do, Ieyasu?	Yamada Shin'emon	Taiga drama	
2026	Brothers in Arms	Sakai Tadatsugu	Taiga drama	

=== Radio ===
Year	Title	Network	Ref.
2012	Three F presents Amano Kikaku	Tokyo FM	

=== Advertisements ===
Year	Title	Ref.
Cygames Granblue Fantasy		

== Works ==
=== Films ===
All of his works are directing.

Year	Title	Notes	Ref.
2004	Cage	One of the works of the Yubari International Fantastic Film Festival	

== See also ==
- Kyaeen
- Udo Suzuki
