= Channel A =

Channel A may refer to:

- Channel A (TV channel)
- Channel A (TV series)
