= Osamu Hayashi =

Japanese tarento and Yobikō lecturer (born 1965)

- 林 修
- Born: 2 September 1965 (age 60); Nagoya, Aichi Prefecture, Japan
- Education: University of Tokyo Graduate School for Law and Politics
- Occupations: Yobikō lecturer; multi-tarento; television presenter; author
- Years active: 2010– (as television personality)
- Notable work: Itsu yaru ka? Imadesho!
- Television: Osamu Hayashi no Ima desyo! High School; Waratte Iitomo!; Nep League
- Height: 1.75 m (5 ft 9 in)
- Awards: Shingo Wordsmiths Year Award (2013); GQ Men Of The Year 2013 Award
- Website: Official website

Osamu Hayashi (林 修, Hayashi Osamu; born 2 September 1965 in Nagoya, Aichi Prefecture) is a Japanese tarento and Yobikō lecturer.

Hayashi is a full-time lecturer at Toshin High School Satellite Prep School Language Arts. He teaches modern language. Hayashi is represented with Watanabe Entertainment.

== Bibliography ==
Year	Title
2012	Itsu yaru ka? Imadesho!
2013	Ima yaru Hito ni naru 40 no Shūkan
2013	Osamu Hayashi no: Shigoto ga umaku iku "Hanashikata" Kōza
2013	Osamu Hayashi no "Ima Yomitai" Nihon Bungaku Kōza
2013	Juken Hitsuyō-ron: Jinsei no Kiso wa Juken de Tsukuri Eru
2013	Itan no Susume
2014	Osamu Hayashi no Shigoto Genron
2015	Sushi, unagi, tempura: Osamu Hayashi ga Kataru Shoku no Bigaku
2015	Illust Zukai: Itsu yaru ka? Imadesho!

== Filmography ==
=== Regular programmes ===
==== Current appearances ====
Year	Title	Network	Notes
2013	Nep League	Fuji TV	Commentator at solving problems
2013	Go Go! Smile!	CBC	Tuesday commentator
2013	Good! Morning	TV Asahi	Friday commentator
2014	Nihongo Sagu Q Variety: Quiz! Sore Maji!? Nippon	Fuji TV	Japanese master
2014	Osamu Hayashi no Imadesho! Kōza	TV Asahi	Student; Osamu Hayashi-sensei no Ima yaru! High School successor programme
2014	The Hakugaku	TV Asahi	
2014	Cream Vs. Osamu Hayashi! Quiz Survivor	TV Asahi	
2015	Hayashi-Sensei ga Odoroku Hatsumimi-gaku!	TBS	

==== Former appearances ====
Year	Title	Network	Notes
2013	Waratte Iitomo!	Fuji TV	Monday quasi-regular
2013	Osamu Hayashi-sensei no Ima yaru! High School	TV Asahi	Student; In October 2013 it was a continuation from a corner from Onegai! Ranking
2014	Viking	Fuji TV	Summer Vacation Special regular
2014	Hayashi-sensei no Tsūkai! Ikizama Dai Jiten	TBS	
2015	Osamu Hayashi-Sekai no Meicho	BS-TBS	

=== Guest appearances ===
Year	Title	Network	Notes
2010	Onegai! Ranking	TV Asahi	
2011	Sekai wa Kotoba de dekite iru	Fuji TV	
2011	Haneru no To bira	Fuji TV	
2012	R no Hōsoku	NHK-E	
2012	Nichiyō α	Fuji TV	
2012	Golden Break	Fuji TV	
2012	Warattame Tengoku	Fuji TV	
2013	Masahiro Nakai no Kinyōbi no SMA-tachi e	TBS	
2013	Shiritagari	Fuji TV	
2013	Sunday Scramble	TV Asahi	
2013	Mabatakī: Shijō Saitan no Owarai Battle	Fuji TV	
2013	Amaō no Kyōkan School	TV Asahi	
2013	FNS 5000 Bangumi 10 Ban'nin Sō Shutsuen! Ganbattataishō	Fuji TV	
2013	Pical no Teiri: Golden Shinshutsu 2-jikan Chō SP	Fuji TV	
2013	Chakushin Orei! Kētai Ōgiri	NHK-G	
2013	Natsume Kinenbi	TV Asahi	
2013	Shabekuri 007	NTV	
2013	NHK Pro Yakyū-Chunichi×Rakuten	NHK-G	Guest appearance in sub-audio
2013	Jounetsu Tairiku	TBS	
2013	TV Shakai Jikken: Asunaro Lab	Fuji TV	
2013	Keiba-ba no Tatsujin	Green Channel	
2013	Gyōretsu no dekiru: Hōritsusōdansho	NTV	
2013	Oshare-ism	NTV	
2013	SMAP×SMAP	KTV, Fuji TV	Appeared in Bistro SMAP
2013	Chubaw desu yo!	TBS	
2013	Keiba Beat	TNC	He made approximately 360,000 hits by the Sapporo Memorial with a triple single mid-mark mistake
2013	Mahō no Restaurant	MBS	
2013	Switch Interview: Tatsujin-tachi	NHK-E	
2013	64th NHK Kōhaku Uta Gassen	NHK-G	
2014	Tōsō-chū	Fuji TV	
2014	Tetsuko no Heya	TV Asahi	
2014	Matsuko no Shiranai Sekai	TBS	

=== Radio ===
Year	Title	Network	Notes	Ref.
2013	Tama musubi	TBS Radio		
2013	Kakihana Tadashi no anata to Happy!	NBS		
2013	Nanami Afternoon Variety	Nishiowari CATV	(Note: Its live broadcast was simulcasted in radio and television.)	
2014	School Of Lock!	Tokyo FM		

=== Advertisements ===
Year	Title	Link
	Toshin High School - Eastward Satellite Prep School	1
2013	Toyota Navi Dai 5 Man-en Present Campaign "Itsu Kau ka? Imadesho!"	
2013	SKY Perfect JSAT Group Toshin High School Osamu Hayashi no Sk-Per! Kōgi	
2013	Lotte Crazy Gum Hōsōkyoku "Toshin High School: Hayashi-sensei no Imadesho!! Gum desho!" "Kamu", "Fukuramu", "GumGum"	2
2013	Institute Matchmaker Association "Kon Katsu itsu yaru no? Imadesho!!" Image character	3
2013	H.I.S "Gaigairyokō Hinshitsu", "Kaigai Support"	4
2013	Takahashi Shoten "Mirai ga hajimaru yo: Osamu Hayashi"	5
2016	Kincho Combat "Gokiburi no Shūsei Hayashi-sensei no Kōgi"	
2016	Ikeda Mohando-Muhi HD	
2016	SBI Sumishin Net Bank Mr. Card Loan	

=== Events ===
Year	Title	Link	Ref.
2013	Kurazushi to Tezuka Production no Collab Kikaku Tezuka Spot Happyōkai		
2013	Mei He Open Campus Special Kikaku: Osamu Hayashi-sensei Kōen "Itsu yaru ka? Imadesho!"		
2013	Dai 26-kai Teiji Sōkai Osaka-fu Yū Ren Seinen Bukai Kinen Kōen: Itsu yaru ka? Imadesho!		
2013	H.I.S Shin Kokusai Charter Kōkūkaisha AAA Setsuritsu Gaiyō Happyōkai		
2013	Yōkoso Senpai Itsu yaru ka? Imadesho! Naze Benkyō Shinakereba ikenai no ka		
2013	Hakodate Keiba Kaisai-bi Event Osamu Hayashi: Aterunara, Imadesho! Sprint S Stage		
2013	Shukutoku University Fair 2013 in Sendai Shingaku Sōdan-kai		
2013	Nagasaki Wesleyan University Open Campus 2013		
2013	Osamu Hayashi Kōen-kai: Motivation Up no Hōhō		
2013	Ima yaru Hito no Hisshō-hō 10-kajō – "Itsu yaru ka? Imadesho!" no Hayashi-sensei ni yoru Imasugu dekiru Jiko Kaizō-jutsu – Itsu kiku ka? Imadesho!		
2013	Itsu Kau ka? Imadesho! Campaign		
2014	Osamu Hayashi-sensei no Kōen-kai & Casual French: Wadai no Ninki Kōshi ni Manabu, Jinsei o Seikō ni Michibiku Hiketsu to wa?	6	

=== Magazines ===
Year	Title	Notes
2013	Friday	
2013	The Television	
2013	Shūkan Asahi	
2013	Weekly Asahi Geinō	
2013	Sunday Mainichi	
2013	Wine Ōkoku	
2013	Number Do	"Futoranai Seikatsu 2013 –Kenkō to Karui Karada o Te ni Ireyou– Do 2013 Early Summer-gō"
2013	Josei Jishin	""Imadesho!" Hayashi-sensei "Nenshū wa 5 Sen Man Chō" to Dōgyōsha no Koe"
2013	Josei Seven	"Imadesho Sensei: Tōdaigōkakusha ni Mazakon nado 3ttsu no Tokuchō to Shiteki"\

=== Newspapers ===
Year	Title
2013	Nikkei Plus One
2013	Sports Nippon

=== Internet ===
Year	Title	Website	Notes	Ref.
2012	1000-Jikan Namahōsō Xperia dake Seikatsu: Danjo 7-ri Yume Monogatari	Niconico Live		
2013	Heiwa presents Osamu Hayashi no Rekka no Honō Juku	Heiwa Corporation	Released as part of Rekka no Honō Juku. "Rekka no Honō Juku Jugyō: Sā, Rekka no Honō no Jugyō o Hajimemashou! Itsu miru ka? Imadesho!"	78

=== News websites ===
Year	Website	Title
2013	R25	""Imadesho!" ga Honkaku-teki ni Hayarikotoba ni"
2013	News Post Seven	"Imadesho Sensei "Daigakusei no Gakuryoku Teika, Higashidaikyōdai mo Reigai janai""
2013	News Post Seven	"Gendai Bun no Dokkairyoku Taijin Kankei o Kizuku Chikara ni Kanzen Icchi to Imadesho Sensei"
2013	News Post Seven	"Imadesho Sensei "1 Page Yomu dake de Gatsunto Kuru Hon" o Atsuku Kataru"
2013	Da Vinci Denshi Navi	""Itsu yaru ka? Imadesho!" Wakatcha irukedo... Dōsureba Kōdō-ryoku ga Mi ni tsuku? "
2013	J-Cast News	""Itsu yaru ka? Imadesho!' Serif ga Daininki: Wadai no Yobikō Karisuma Kyōshi wa donna Yatsuda"
2013	Mainichi Shimbun Digital	"Osamu Hayashi-san: "Imadeshou" Ryūkōgotaishō Nominate ni Jishin Rival wa "Avenomics deshou!" "
2013	Rikunabi Next	"Osamu Hayashi-san Pro-Ron. / Rikunabi Next "
