= UltraCats =

- Origin: Japan
- Years active: 2001–2002
- Labels: Sony Music Japan
- Past members: Teruyoshi Uchimura; Kazuki Ōtake; Udo Suzuki; Jinny Lee
- Website: Official info page

UltraCats (ウルトラキャッツ, UrutoraKyattsu; formed October 19, 2001) is a Japanese popular musical group consisting of members Utchan, Ōtake, Udo, and Jinny. After Jinny left UltraCats, she started a solo career as Chae Yeon.

== Members ==
- Teruyoshi Uchimura, Utchan, born July 22, 1964
- Kazuki Ōtake, Ōtake, born December 8, 1967
- Udo Suzuki, Udo, January 19, 1970
- Jinny Lee, Jinny, born December 10, 1978

== History ==
=== Formation in 'Urinari' ===
UltraCats started off as a singing group on a Japanese TV show Utchan Nanchan no Urinari!! in 2001, a year after Jinny's arrival in Japan. Jinny had already been on this show for since 2000, but she had not had a chance to pursue her dream of becoming a singer to the fullest, although amongst other projects, she had a chance to take part in the short-lived singing group Brand New Biscuits in early 2001.

Knowing her dream and struggle, after Brand New Biscuits' cessation, Uchimura started UltraCats as a part of the show, and besides them, he included the members Udo, which makes it to have a similar member structure to the once popular singing group from the show, Pocket Biscuits, and later Ōtake.

=== Activities in Korea ===
However, they were not able to sell any CDs until the very end of the show that suddenly came in March 2002. In terms of the activities as UltraCats in the show, all they did was go to Korea and try to promote by singing their only song at that time "Barem" in Korean on the streets—which attracted a handful of fans that supported them by going around to their street performances and making a website—and by contacting media and producers, which did not always welcome them.

Their first step to success as a professional singing group came when they were offered to sing on a stage after the live broadcasting of a popular Korean music program, SBS Popular Song. Their offer was that after UltraCats' performance, there would be a vote by the audience, and if UltraCats were able to obtain at least 70% support by the audience, they could sell a CD in Korea.

To everyone's surprise, UltraCats was able to obtain over 90% support of 426/473 people, going far over the minimum of 331/473 people, and in addition to selling a CD in Korea, it was also decided that Sony Music Entertainment would sell UltraCats' song "Barem" in Japanese in Japan.

=== New Show 'Ultra C' ===
During the time when they were still continuing their activities in Korea and were not able to sell any CD's, it was decided that the show Urinari would end at the end of March 2002. Uchimura asked the producer if they could continue UltraCats as a part of Urinari in some form even after it ended, since he felt responsible for starting the group UltraCats and not being able to do much, especially for Jinny who he knew came to Japan as she wanted to become a singer, but the answer was no.

So Uchimura started asking around almost all the TV stations around Tokyo if they could start a show in any form for UltraCats so that they could continue singing and selling CD's, on the condition that he would not need any salary, as he had been popular and active for over 15 years and his salary would be costly, and that he would do anything to help out such as providing funding for the show if needed.

Eventually TBS agreed to give them late-evening 30-minute show time from April 2002, for half a year, which was titled Ultra C. Through this show, UltraCats was able to sell additional CD's and have a concert at the end of the show, after which Jinny went back to Korea and became successful as singer Chae Yeon in 2003.

== Discography ==
=== Studio albums ===
Title	Album details	Peak chart positions
Title	Album details	JPN
Ultra C (ウルトラC)	Released: September 19, 2002; Label: Sony Music Japan	49

=== Singles ===
Title	Year	Peak chart positions	Album
Title	Year	JPN	Album
"Baraem ~Negai~" (バレム～願い～)	2002	20	Ultra C
"Sora to Daichi ga Deau Basho" (空と大地が出会う場所)	2002	27	Ultra C
"Tenshi no Tameiki" (天使ノタメイキ)	2002	48	Ultra C
