= Adeyto =

French artist and singer-songwriter (born 1976)

Adeyto Rex Angeli
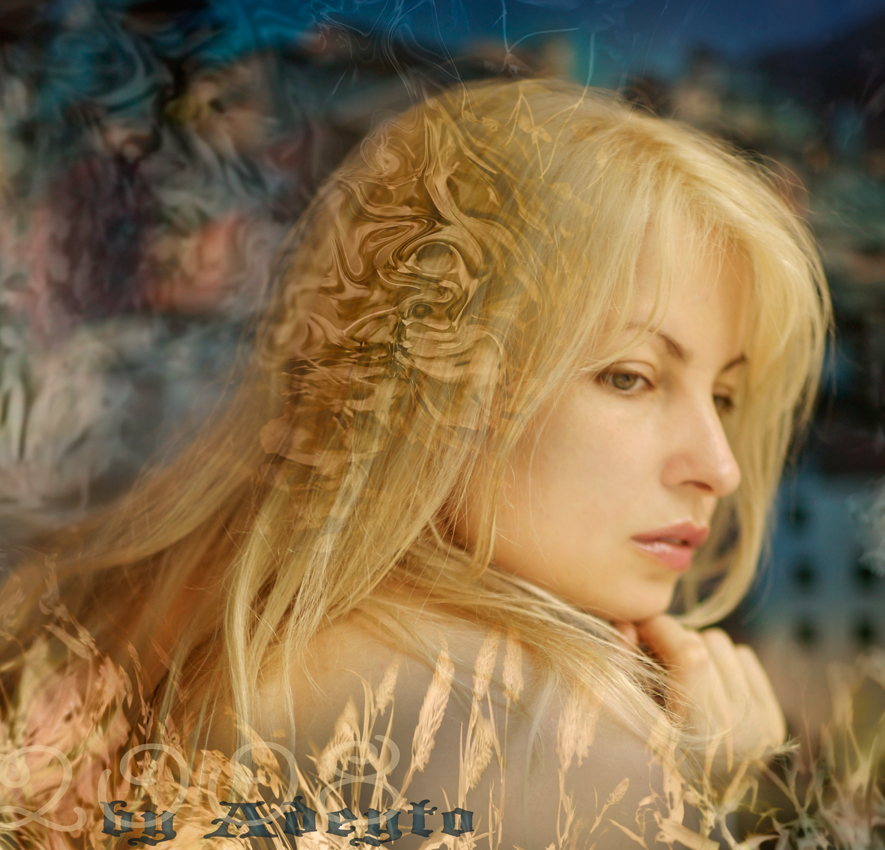

Background information
- Born: 3 December 1976 (age 49); Strasbourg, France
- Genre: French pop/Alternative/Art rock
- Years active: 1999–present
- Label: AVEX Trax
- Website: http://adeyto.com/

Adeyto (also known as Adeyto Rex Angeli and Laura Windrath; born 3 December 1976) is a French artist, singer-songwriter, actress, director, photographer, university professor and fashion designer based in Japan.

== Biography ==
Adeyto was born in Strasbourg, France, to a French mother and German father.

Adeyto started acting at the age of 8. She moved to Japan in 1998 and has appeared in Japanese TV serials, movies and was a regular on major variety shows like Waratte Iitomo and Sma-Station.

As a photographer and cinematographer, Adeyto Rex Angeli works behind the camera. She was responsible for the cover photography for Akino Arai's 2008 single "Kin no nami sen no nami".

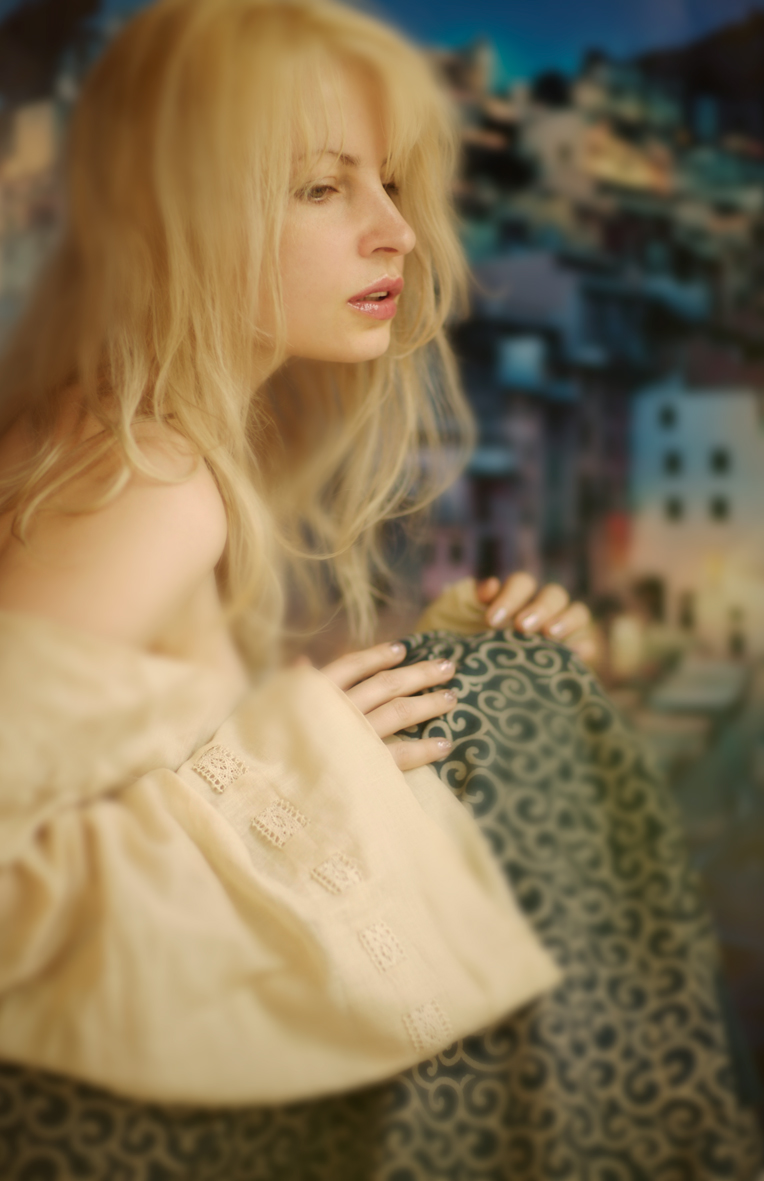
Self portrait

In 2005, she designed the stage costumes for the La Stella players of the opera La bohème presented the same year in Tokyo.

From July 2009, Adeyto became a professor at the University of Creation; Art, Music & Social Work.

As of 2012, producer Sir Ridley Scott chose Adeyto to be co-director & cinematographer for the upcoming film 『JAPAN IN A DAY [ジャパン イン ア デイ]』 to be released worldwide in 2013. The film reflects the life in Japan on 3.11.2012, a year after the east Japan earthquake and will be nationwide in cinemas from 11.3.2012. Japan in a Day is also the opening film for the 25th Tokyo International Film Festival.

== Music ==
Adeyto has released music video DVDs, including Greed (2007) and End of the Word, The Mortal and The Bridge (all in 2006). She was also the lead singer and songwriter for a band named Genetic Sovereign, based in Tokyo, which recorded the albums Luminary in 2004 and Tempus Aurum in 2005.

Her album Adeyto – Temptation de l'Ange was released by AVEX Trax in November 2008. In 2008, she also appeared as a DJ on the stage at the Tokyo Dome for X Japan's World Tour I.V Towards Destruction and sang for AVEX 20th Anniversary Club Legend Juliana's Tokyo.

== Filmography ==
=== Films ===
- Meoto Manzai (2001) as Emma
- Hi wa mata noboru (2002) as secretary
- Returner (2002) as future technician (credited as Laura Windrash[sic])
- College of Our Lives (2003) aka Collage of Our Lives and Renai Shashin (Japan) as girl in NY church
- Get Up! (2003) as Marilyn Monroe
- Umizaru (2004) aka Sea Monkey (USA) as fashion model
- Peanuts (2006) as Itetsu's wife Toscania
- Die Silbermaske (2006) as Elis
- Sushi King Goes to New York (2008) as blonde judge
- Detroit Metal City (2008) as Jack Ill Dark's (Gene Simmons) girlfriend
- Japan in a day (2013) as Adeyto

=== Video games ===
- Ever17 (2011)
- Arms (2017) as Twintelle

== Television appearances ==
=== Drama ===
- Namida wo Fuite (2000) as Catherine – FujiTV
- A side B – Simulation Garage (2001) as Susannah – BS-i
- A side B – Counseling Booth (2001) as Susannah – BS-i
- The Apartment (2002) as Nancy – TBS
- Hatsu Taiken (2002) as Movie Star – FujiTV
- Yanpapa (2002) as Jessica – TBS
- Jiku Keisatsu 2 (2002) as Marilyn Monroe – NTV
- A side B – Simulation Garage (2003) as Susannah – TBS
- Kanjo ga shinjatta (2004) as Italian lady – NTV
- Yonimo kimyō na monogatari: Aki no tokubetsu hen (2005) as "Bijo Kan" no Bijo – FujiTV
- Primadam (2006) as Prof. Sophie – NTV
- Ikiru (2007) as Anna – TV Asahi
- Yama Onna Kabe Onna (2007) as on-set French coach – FujiTV
- Mop Girl (2007) as Dr. Nastazia – TV Asahi
- First Kiss (2007) – FujiTV
- Yūkan Club (2007) as Sophie-Catherine – NTV
- Scrap Teacher (2008) as Claudia – NTV

=== Variety shows ===
- Waratte Iitomo – Fuji TV
- SMAP×SMAP – Fuji TV
- Sma-Station – TV Asahi
- Out and About (2008) – NHK
- Terebi de Furansugo (2008) – NHK
- Out and About (2009) – NHK
