= Watanabe Entertainment =

Major Japanese entertainment conglomerate

Watanabe Entertainment Co., Ltd.
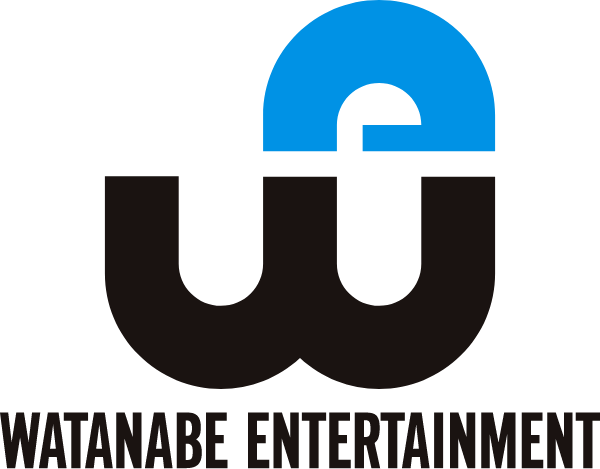
- Native name: 株式会社ワタナベエンターテインメント
- Type: Kabushiki gaisha (Joint-stock company)
- Traded as: Unlisted
- Industry: Service industry (entertainment)
- Genre: Tarento management Entertainment
- Founded: October 24, 2000
- Headquarters: WES Building, 4-2-12, Jingūmae, Shibuya, Tokyo, Japan; ZIP 150-0001
- Area served: Japan
- Key people: Masaki Yoshida (Representative chairman); Miki Watanabe (Representative president)
- Owner: Watanabe Productions
- Website: www.watanabepro.co.jp

Watanabe Entertainment Co., Ltd. (株式会社ワタナベ エンターテインメント, Kabushiki-gaisha Watanabe Entaateinmento) is a major Japanese entertainment conglomerate and a member of the Watanabe Production Group.

== Company ==
Watanabe Entertainment's head office is in Shibuya, Tokyo and the company's principle functions include organizing television and radio programming, managing Japanese entertainers as well as hosting foreign entertainers on visits to Japan, and planning and production of various commercial and goods advertising ventures.

The company is known informally as either Wanatanabe Entertainment (ワタナベエンターテインメント), Watanabe Enta (ワタナベエンタ) or simply WE.

The current president of the company is Miki Watanabe (渡辺ミキ), who has been leading the company since it was created from the parent company, Watanabe Productions (渡辺プロダクション) in 2000.

== Current notable talents ==
=== Tarento ===
Affiliated idols are categorized here.

==== Male ====
- Shouri Kondou
- Mickey Curtis (actor)
- Yuya Endo (actor)
- Masaki Kaji (actor)
- Osamu Hayashi (lecturer)
- Hifumi Katō (professional shogi player)
- K Dub Shine (hip-hop artist)
- Kenta Nishimura (novelist)
- Shiraku Tatekawa (rakugoka)
- Sou Mizukami (quiz player)
- D-Boys (actors group)

- Masato Wada
- Hiroki Suzuki
- Hirofumi Araki (D-Date)
- Kōji Seto (D-Date)
- Tomo Yanagishita (D-Date)
- Tetsuya Makita
- Masahiro Usui
- Masashi Mikami
- Yamada Yusuke
- Arata Horie (D-Date)
- Shuto Miyazaki
- Masaki Nakao
- Yūki Yamada (D2)
- Takahisa Maeyama (D2)
- Atsushi Shiramata (D2)

==== Female ====
- Shizuka Ōya (idol, former AKB48)
- Gal Sone (competitive eater)
- Yuki Kashiwagi (idol, former AKB48)
- Yoshiko Kuga (actress)
- Nachu (tarento, former SDN48)
- Akiko Matsumoto (tarento)
- Sei Matobu (actress)
- Ai Mikami (actress)
- Sakura Miyajima (TV announcer)

=== Comedians ===
- Hideyuki Nakayama
- Honjamaca (Hidehiko Ishitsuka and Toshiaki Megumi)
- Neptune (Jun Nagura, Ken Horiuchi and Taizo Harada)
- TIM (Golgo Matsumoto and Red Yoshida)
- Ryo Fukawa
- Bibiru Ōki
- Xabungle (Yosuke Matsuo and Ayumu Kato)
- Sayaka Aoki
- Ungirls (Takushi Tanaka and Yoshiaki Yamane)
- Choushinjuku (Eagle Mizokami, Tiger Fukuda, Thank You Yasutomi, Boo Fujiwara, Koala Koarashi and Ike Nwala)
- Wagaya (Yoshiyuki Tsubokura, Hiroyuki Sugiyama and Shun Yatabe)
- Lotti (Soichi Nakaoka and Kentaro Kokado)
- Haraichi (Yu Sawabe and Yuki Iwao)
- Sunshine Ikezaki
- Abareru-kun
- Atsugiri Jason
- Hanako (Tatsuhiro Kikuta, Hiroki Akiyama and Dai Okabe)
- Yonsentōshin (Takumi Goto, Hiroki Tsuzuki and Ryodai Ishibashi)
- Nora Hirano
- Nyanko Star (Super Sansuke and Angora Soncho)
- Kanjuku Fresh (Tetsuya Ikeda and Layla Ikeda)

=== Musical artists ===
- Rag Fair
- Yorico
- Shoko Nakagawa
- Little Glee Monster
- Nokko

== Former notable talents ==
=== Tarento ===
==== Male ====
- Masaya Nakamura (actor)
- Jun Shison (actor, D2 member)

==== Female ====
- Jun Amaki (gravure model)
- Konomi Watanabe (child actress)
- Asuka Kuramochi (tarento, former AKB48)
- Marika Tani (idol, former SKE48, former HKT48)
