= Shinya Ueda =

Japanese comedian and television presenter

- 上田 晋也
- Born: 7 May 1970 (age 56); Minami-ku, Kumamoto, Kumamoto Prefecture, Japan
- Other names: Shikai-ō (司会王); Media-ō (メディア王); Dōtei Banchō (童貞番長; as a student); Bakabon no Papa (バカボンのパパ)
- Education: Waseda University Faculty of Education (dropped out)
- Occupations: Comedian; television presenter; actor
- Years active: 1991–present
- Agents: Prime; Natural Eight
- Style: Manzai; conte (tsukkomi)
- Television: Oshare-ism; Otona no Gakuryoku Kentei nado; Dare mo Dhiranai Nakeruuta
- Height: 1.72 m (5 ft 8 in)
- Partner: Teppei Arita
- Relatives: Keisuke Ueda (brother)

Notes
- Same year/generation as: Kyaeen

Shinya Ueda (上田 晋也, Ueda Shin'ya; born 7 May 1970, in Minami-ku, Kumamoto, Kumamoto Prefecture) is a Japanese comedian, television presenter, caster and actor who is the tsukkomi of the comedy duo Cream Stew. His partner is Teppei Arita.

Ueda is represented with Prime and later Natural Eight.

== Filmography ==
To see his appearances as part the comedy duo, see Cream Stew.

=== Current appearances ===
Year	Title	Network	Notes	Ref.
2005	Oshare-ism	NTV	Sundays from 22:00 to 22:30	
2010	Going! Sports & News	NTV	Weekends from 23:55 to 00:50	
2014	Shinya Ueda no Nippon no Kako Toi	TBS	Wednesdays from 00:41 to 01:51	
	Ueda-chan-nel	Tele-Asa Channel	Every other Tuesdays from 22:00 to 22:55	
2015	Renzoku Talk Show: Ōta-Ueda	CTV	Weekdays from midnight	
2016	Strong Point	BS NTV	Sundays from 17:00 to 17:30; Narration	

=== Former appearances ===
Year	Title	Network	Notes
	Tensai Bit-kun	NHK-E	
	Shitteru? 24-Ji.	NBS	
	Unmei no Sūji	TV Asahi	One-off
	Calendar Quiz: Ā Omoidasenai	NHK-G	One-off
	Shinya Ueda to Daimaou Kosaka no All Night Nippon R	NBS	One-off
	Duòmo	KBC	
	Dare mo Dhiranai Nakeruuta	NTV	
	Tensai terebi-kun Max Bit World	NHK-G	
	Quiz: Bingo Line	TV Asahi	One-off
	Ran! Sō Senkyo 2012	TBS	One-off; Special presenter
2007	Otona no Gakuryoku Kentei nado	NTV	One-off
2009	Oshiete Mr. News: Akira Ikegami no Sōna 'nda Nippon	Fuji TV	One-off
2011	Nakayoshi TV	Fuji TV	Irregular

=== TV drama ===
Year	Title	Role	Network	Notes	Ref.
1992	Geshi Monogatari	KTV	Toru		
1993	Homuratatsu		NHK		
2005	Rei no kanata e: The Winds Of God		TV Asahi		
2007	Akiko Wada Satsujin Jiken	Taizo Shimabukuro	TBS		
2007	The 4400		CBS	Cameo	
2009	Ike Men Soba-ya Tantei: Ī 'nda ze!	Kamisama	NTV		
2016	Tensai Bakabon	Bakabon no Papa	NTV	Lead role	

=== Film ===
Year	Title	Role	Notes	Ref.
2020	Family Bond	Yasu		

=== Anime television ===
Title	Role
Case Closed	Kyoto Ueda

=== Music videos ===
Year	Title
2011	Funky Monkey Babys "Love Letter"

=== Books ===
Year	Title
2008	Heizo Takenaka-Shinya Ueda no Nippon no Tsukurikata

=== Stage ===
Year	Title	Role
2004	Love Letters	Andy
2012	Kekka, Mendokusai Otokodeshita.	
