= Teppei Arita =

Japanese owarai tarento

- 有田 哲平
- Born: 3 February 1971 (age 55); Higashi-ku, Kumamoto, Kumamoto Prefecture, Japan
- Other names: Aripei; Aripē
- Education: Rikkyo University Faculty of Law (dropped out)
- Years active: 1991–present
- Agents: Prime; Natural Eight
- Notable work: Tokuten Eizō
- Style: Manzai; conte (tsukkomi, boke)
- Television: Go Taimen Variety: 7-ji ni aimashou; Zenryoku! Datsuryoku Times; Arita Generation; Ariken; Arita to Matsuko to Otome; Arita no Yarashī Hitobito
- Height: 1.74 m (5 ft 9 in)
- Partner: Shinya Ueda
- Relatives: Shinpei Arita (brother); Toru Yano (uncle)

Notes
- Same year/generation as: Kyaeen

Teppei Arita (有田 哲平, Arita Teppei; born 3 February 1971, in Higashi-ku, Kumamoto, Kumamoto Prefecture) is a Japanese comedian, television presenter and television writer who performs boke of the comedy duo Cream Stew. His partner is Shinya Ueda. He is nicknamed Aripei (アリペイ) and Aripē (アリペー).

Arita is represented by Natural Eight.

== Impressions ==
- Animal Hamaguchi
- Antonio Inoki
- Kensuke Sasaki
- Nobuhiko Takada (also under his Generalissimo Takada persona)
- Riki Choshu
- Genichiro Tenryu
- Yuji Nagata (Note: While trying to perform the armlock he made a facial expression where he faces his white eyes (commonly known as Killer Nagata).)
- Manabu Nakanishi
- Hiroshi Fujioka
- Tatsumi Fujinami
- San'yūtei Enraku V

== Filmography ==
The lists below only features Arita himself. To see his appearances with the comedy duo, see Cream Stew (comedy duo).

=== Current appearances ===
Year	Title	Network	Notes	Ref.
2015	Zenryoku! Datsuryoku Times	Fuji TV		
2016	Go Taimen Variety: 7-ji ni aimashou	TBS		
2016	Arita Generation	TBS		
2016	Arita to Shūkan Pro-Wrest to	Amazon Prime Video	MC	

=== Former appearances ===
Year	Title	Network	Notes	Ref.
	Uchimura Produce	TV Asahi	Regular appearances	
	Guruguru Ninety Nine	NTV	"Kabutcha ya: Yo!" regular	
2002	London Hearts	TV Asahi		
2003	Me kara Uroko! 21	NBS		
2004	Koisuru Hanikami	TBS		
2004	Bucchake! 99	TBS		
2004	Ameagari Kesshitai no Talk Bangumi: Ame Ta-lk!	TV Asahi	Occasional appearances	
2004	Tonneruzu no Minasan no Okage deshita	Fuji TV	"Hakase to Joshu: Komaka sugite Tsutawaranai Monomane Senshuken" regular as Monomane Robo 1-gō Arita-kun	
2005	Tequito TV	TV Asahi	Irregular appearances	
2005	Matsumoto Hitoshi no suberanai Hanashi	Fuji TV	4th and 3rd The Golden SP 3	
2007	Muchaburi!	TBS		
2008	Ariken	TV Tokyo		
2008	Quiz Time Limit	TBS	One-off specials	
2008	Un-Nan Kyokugen Neta Battle! The Iromonea Warawa setara 100 Man-en	TBS		
2009	Ore-tachi! Quiz Man	TBS		
	Untouchable no Chicago Mango	TBS Radio	Multiple appearances	
2010	Gatten Obon Rinji Eigyōchū: Mania ni Manabu Beer o oishiku Nomu Hō	NHK-G		
2010	Arita to Matsuko to Otome	TBS		
2011	Watashi no Nani ga Ike nai no?	TBS		
2012	Early Chaplin	TBS	One-off specials	
2013	Arita no Yarashī Hitobito	TBS		
2013	Arita no Yarashī Hanashi	TBS		
2014	Arita no Yarashī...	TBS		
2015	Arita Children	TBS		
2015	Ari yori no Ari: Risō no Danjo o Visual-ka	TBS		

=== TV drama ===
Year	Title	Role	Network	Notes	Ref.
2000	Style!	Jun Inokozuchi	TV Asahi		
2001	Gakkō no Kaidan: Haru no Mononoke Special		KTV	Episode 3	
2002	HaruRanman	Real estate agent	KTV		
2005	Rei no kanata e: The Winds Of God		TV Asahi		
2007	Akiko Wada Satsujin Jiken	Keisuke Mikami	TBS		
2007	The 4400		CBS	Cameo	
2012	Papadol!	Himself	TBS	Episode 3	
2018	Half Blue Sky	Masahiko Tsumagari	NHK	Asadora	

=== Films ===
Year	Title	Role	Notes	Ref.
2006	Peanuts	Baroness		
2010	Uchū de 1-ban Wagamamana Hoshi			
2012	TSY Time Slip Yankee	Friendship		
2012	Roadside Fugitive		Cameo	
2025	Blank Canvas: My So-Called Artist's Journey	Nakata		

=== Anime television ===
Title	Role
Case Closed	Arita Class President

=== Anime films ===
Year	Title	Role
2008	Doraemon: Nobita and the Green Giant Legend	Paruna

=== Internet ===
Year	Title	Website	Notes
2009	Nan demo Arita'!	goomo	
2009	Kaettekita Beta Drama	BeeTV	Revived from Cream Stew no tarira Re-learn

=== Advertisements ===
Year	Title
1997	Fujifilm QuickSnap Umijarisuigyo Jidai
2012	Kirin Beverage Fire

=== Music videos ===
Year	Title	Notes
2004	Zeebra "Call: Skit"	Impersonated Nobuhiko Takada
2006	Gakiranger "Stop Playin' A Wall"	

=== Magazines ===
Year	Title
2010	Weekly Playboy "Ore wa Omae no kamaseinuda!"

== Works ==
=== DVD ===
Year	Title	Notes
2008	Tokuten Eizō	Director
2011	Silver Fiction: Dai 1-shū	

=== Books ===
Year	Title	Notes
2010	Pro-Wrestler: Densetsu no Big Mouth!	Editor

== See also ==
- Cream Stew (comedy duo)
- Shinya Ueda
