= Chae Yeon =

South Korean singer

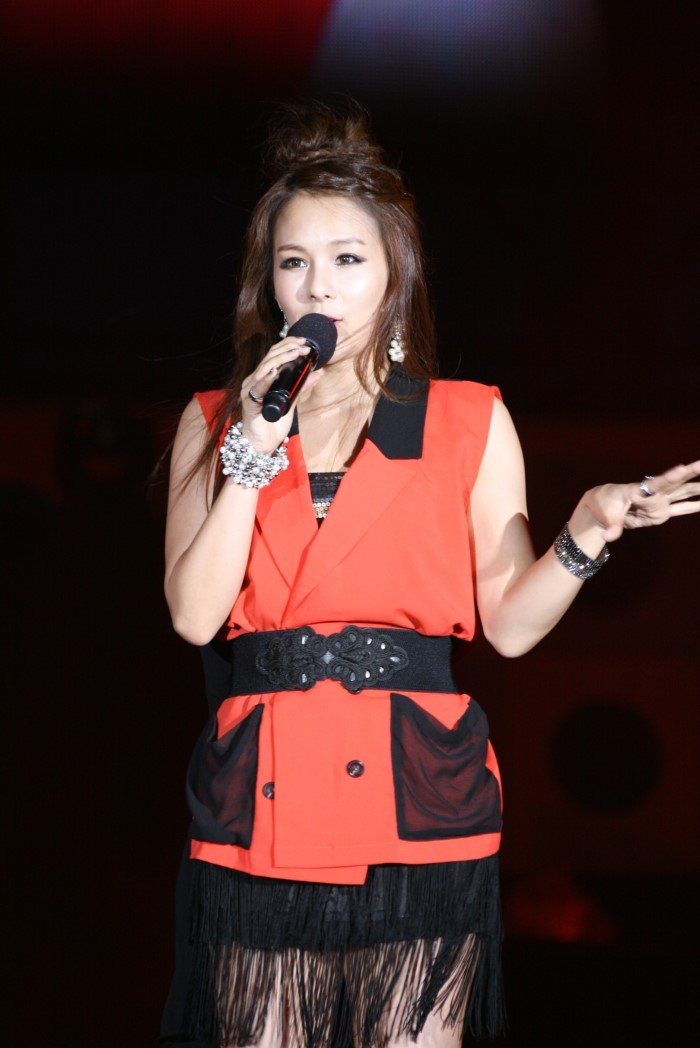

Background information
- Also known as: Jinny Lee
- Born: Lee Jin-sook; December 10, 1978 (age 47); Seoul, South Korea
- Genres: K-pop
- Occupation: Singer
- Years active: 2001–present
- Label: Cai Entertainment
- Formerly of: UltraCats

Korean name
- Hangul: 이진숙
- RR: I Jinsuk
- MR: I Chinsuk

Stage name
- Hangul: 채연
- RR: Chaeyeon
- MR: Ch'aeyŏn

Lee Jin-sook (Korean: 이진숙; born December 10, 1978), better known as Chae Yeon, is a South Korean singer who rose to fame with her hit single "Two of Us" in 2004.

== Career ==
=== Beginning of career ===
Lee originally began her career in Japan as part of Brand New Biscuits(ブランニュービスケット), debuting in Japan on January 1, 2001, as part of a six-member lineup. Brand New Biscuits included also another Korean singer, Yuny Han. Lee was also member of the group UltraCats (ウルトラキャッツ) under the name of "Jinny" (ジニー) or "Jinny Lee" (ジニー・リー) from 2001 to 2002.

Having passed an audition held by an entertainment management company in Japan, Lee first appeared on a show called Uchan Nanchan no Urinari (ウッチャンナンチャンのウリナリ!!) on Japanese NTV. She appeared on the show for almost three years. Along with the television show, she performed as a singer, releasing three singles and one mini-album in Japan.

=== Pursuing career as an entertainer in Korea ===
She returned to Korea with her first official album It's My Time under her new stage name, Chae Yeon. Initially, she was simply viewed as yet another "sexy concept" singer, as many female singers were at that time. Her debut song "위험한 연출" ("Dangerous Directing") did well, but her real success came when her second album released late in 2004. "Two of Us (둘이서)", the lead single, pushed her to No.1 on many music charts in the spring of 2005. The music video for "Two of Us" was controversial for being too "racy" in conservative Korea, as it contained scenes showing her full back and exposed underwear. Subsequently, the video was banned on television, and the airing time was limited to after 10:00 p.m. on some cable channels. Becoming heavily played on radio, the song became so popular that a signature move from the choreographed dance became known as the "Na-na-na" dance, named after the hook of the song. It managed to hit the top of various music charts in Korea. The follow-up single "Come to Me (다가와)" was released soon after and was also popular, riding on the wave of its predecessor.

She returned after a brief break to release her third album III, which came in the fall of 2005. The first single, "오직 너", fared poorly on the charts. The record company then quickly switched to the "Disco Mix" of the song, which helped sustain its life on the charts, although not by much. The second single, "Third Love (세번째 사랑)", also fared poorly. However, this can be attributed to the fade of sexy R&B music in Korea at the time, as ballads were once again the style of choice for Korean singers.

Lee has continually participated in variety shows such as SBS's X-Man and Love Letter. She ended her official schedule with her last X-Man episode on September 25, 2005, to concentrate on recording her fourth album.

Although briefly hospitalised due to exhaustion, she made her comeback at the end of March 2006. Her lead single from her fourth album was "My Love", which was a Latin-tinged dance song. The single was extensively performed, with a remix promoted from May onwards; she then followed up with "Clumsy Love (서투른 사랑)". The album sold 12,346 copies in 2007, placing 68th for the year. She continued to remain a "sexy" singer, saying that she does not mind the label.

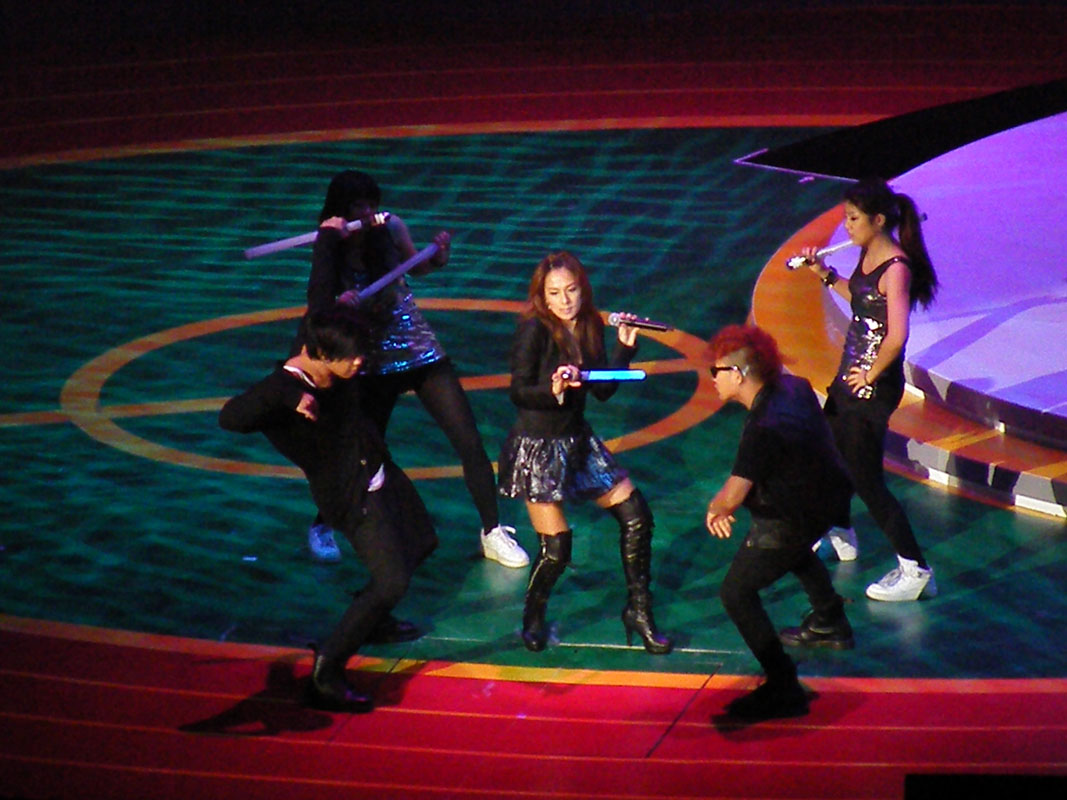
Chae Yeon performing in the closing ceremony of the 2009 East Asian Games

In addition to promoting her album, Lee joined the cast of Hi-Five, part of KBS's Happy Sunday line-up. On the reality-variety show, which also starred Hyun Young, the stars attempted to succeed in various tasks, including starring in a musical, becoming flight attendants, and performing action movie stunts. She remained a part of the show until its cancellation in 2008.

Later that year, she drew media attention with her investment into, and direct involvement with Bequem, a fashion company. She is a spokesperson for the brand, promoting its stylized caps and bags. Moreover, her portfolio with a sexy "Party" concept hit record sales by mixing her sexy image with feminine touches.

The singer came back after a two-year hiatus from the music world with her mini-album Shake. Continuing to stay within the "sexy singer" concept, the lead single "Shake (Heundeullyeo)" is an electronic dance song. The music video was labelled by major networks to be unfit for broadcast without parental advisory warnings.

On December 8, 2009, Lee had her first live mini concert in China. She performed her songs to a sold-out crowd.

On July 22, 2010, Lee made her comeback on M! Countdown. She performed "Crazy" and "Look Look Look" from her new album. It was well received by fans. She continued to perform on various music programs and promote her album. Her second mini album "Look at" was released on July 29, 2010.

She has stated that although she felt awkward and uncomfortable with her sexy image initially, she feels more at ease now, and has stated that she feels sexier the more she relaxes.

In 2015, after a five-year hiatus, Lee made a comeback with the single "Obvious".

On October 17, 2016, she signed with A9 media. She had been promoting mostly in China for a while, so through this label, Lee began promoting actively in Korea through variety shows, dramas, and musicals.

In 2018, she made a comeback with the single "Bazzaya".

On August 20, 2019, her agency Cai Entertainment announced that she will be releasing a new song monthly until December. Her new single "Empty Heart (텅텅빈맘)" was released on August 20, 2019. On September 10, 2019, she released the single "Fly High".

On June 1, 2020, Lee released the single "Pink Monster (핑크몬스터)".

On October 18, 2021, after a three-year hiatus, Lee made a comeback with the ballad single "Sometimes I Cry".

== Personal life ==
Lee was born in Seoul on December 10, 1978. She is a graduate of the Department of Broadcasting & Entertainment, Seoul Arts College. Her family consists of her parents and her older brother.

== Discography ==
=== Studio albums ===
Title	Album details	Peak chart positions	Sales
Title	Album details	KOR	Sales
It's My Time	Released: August 20, 2003; Label: CJ Media Line; Format: CD, cassette; Track listing: 1. 시간 [Time] (Intro); 2. 위험한 연출 [Dangerous Directing]; 3. 사랑느낌 [Feeling of Love]; 4. 소중한 사랑 [Precious Love]; 5. 남자의 사랑 [Men's Love]; 6. 세잎 클로버 [Clover]; 7. 기도 [Prayer]; 8. 너만의 매력 [Your Very Own Charm]; 9. 상처 [Injury]; 10. 오래된 연인 [Old Couple]; 11. 소문 [Rumors]; 12. 휴식 [Relaxation] (Outro)	—	
Virginalness Bloom	Released: December 13, 2004; Label: CJ Media Line; Format: CD, cassette; Track listing: 1. 둘이서 [The Two of Us]; 2. 지독한 외면 [Damm Exterior]; 3. 다가와 [Come to Me]; 4. 보고싶어 [I Want To See]; 5. 믿어 [Trust] ft. D-Low; 6. 다 끝났어 [It's Over]; 7. 행복한 눈물 [Happy Tears]; 8. Dance All Night; 9. 널 사랑할게 [You'll Love]; 10. 사랑인가봐! [I Love Sugar!]; 11. 추억만으로 [Only Memories] ft. D-Low; 12. 바보 [Fool]	—	
Chae Yeon	Released: November 18, 2005; Label: CJ Media Line, Yecheon Media; Format: CD, cassette; Track listing: 1. 오직 너 (Only You); 2. 하얀눈 (White Snow); 3. 덫 (Trap); 4. 욕심쟁이 (Greedy One); 5. 세번째 사랑 (Third Love Feat. Red Roc); 6. 너땜에 (Because of You); 7. 가지마 (Don't Go); 8. 미궁 (Labyrinth); 9. 사랑이 오려나봐 (Maybe Love Is Coming); 10. You; 11. 나쁜여자 (Bad Girl); 12. 오직너(디스코 클럽) (Only You [Disco Club Remix])	16	KOR: 14,550
My Love	Released: March 30, 2007; Label: CJ Media Line, Yecheon Media; Format: CD; Track listing: 1. My Love; 2. 한 사람 (One Person); 3. 부탁 (Request); 4. 낯설은 거짓말 (A Strange Lie); 5. 게임 (Game); 6. 아련한 기다림 (Subtle Waiting); 7. 서투른 사랑 (Clumsy Love); 8. Tell Me; 9. 고귀한 사랑 (Precious Love); 10. 서글픈 이별 (Lonesome Break Up); 11. Party tonight 12. My Love (Global Re-mix); 13. 낯설은 거짓말 (Benny Re-mix) (A Strange Lie); 14. 서투른 사랑 (Mojo House Re-mix) (Clumsy Love); 15. My Love (Bossa Re-mix)	11	KOR: 12,346

=== Single albums ===
Title	Album details	Peak chart positions
Title	Album details	KOR
Bazzaya	Released: November 13, 2018; Label: Cai Entertainment; Format: CD, digital download	70

=== Compilation albums ===
Title	Album details
Figure + Best Album	Released: May 23, 2006; Label: Yecheon Media; Format: CD, cassette; Track listing: 1. 가지마; 2. 하얀눈; 3. 보고 싶어; 4. 행복한 눈물; 5. 욕심쟁이; 6. 소중한 사랑; 7. 널 사랑할게; 8. 세 번째 사랑 [Remix]; 9. 둘이서; 10. 오직 너 [Remix]; 11. 너땜에; 12. 다가와; 13. 사랑인가봐; 14. 위험한 연출; 15. 사링느낌; 16. 남자의 사랑

=== Extended plays ===
Title	Album details	Peak chart positions
Title	Album details	KOR
Shake	Released: May 13, 2009; Label: Vitamin Entertainment; Format: CD; Track listing: 1. 흔들려 (Shake); 2. 울랄라 (Ooh La La); 3. 바보야 (Fool); 4. 이별예감 (Parting Premonition); 5. 변심 (Change Of Mind); 6. 서투른 이별 (Clumsy Parting); 7. 잊자 (Let's Forget); 8. 흔들려 (Shake) (DJ Koo Club Radio Remix Ver.); 9. 흔들려 (Shake) (DJ Koo Club Extend Remix Ver.); 10. 울랄라 (Club Radio Remix Ver.); 11. 울랄라 (Club Extend Remix Ver	—
Look At	Released: July 29, 2010; Label: Stone Music Entertainment; Format: CD, digital download; Track listing: 1. 요즘 여자 Nowadays women 2. Come and Get Me; 3. 거짓말 Lie (feat A.minor); 4. 봐봐봐 Look Look Look; 5. Crazy; 6. Ma Lover (feat A.minor)	10

=== Singles ===
Title	Year	Album
"Dangerous Directing" (위험한 연출)	2003	It's My Time
"Two Of Us" (둘이서)	2004	Virginalness Bloom
"Only You" (오직너)	2005	Chae Yeon
"Third Love" (세번째 사랑)	2006	Chae Yeon
"My Love"	2007	My Love
"Shake" (흔들려)	2009	Shake
"Look Look Look" (봐봐봐)	2010	Look At
"Obvious" (안봐도 비디오) feat. Huh In-chang	2015	Non-album single
"Bazzaya" (봤자야)	2018	Bazzaya
"Sometimes I Cry" (난 가끔 눈물을 흘린다)	2021	Non-album single

== Endorsements ==
- D&G [Fashion Wear]
- Elle Korea
- Jinro Soju
- DnShop [Fashion Wear, Cosmetic Products]
- Make Up For Ever [Make-up Cosmetic]
- ChocoGem [Handmade Accessory]

== Filmography ==
=== Television shows ===
Year	Title	Role	Ref.
2023	Show King Night	Judge	

== Awards and nominations ==
Award	Year	Category	Nominated work / nominee	Result	Ref.
KBS Music Awards	2005	Singer of the Year	Chae Yeon	Won	
Mnet Asian Music Awards	2003	Best New Artist	"Dangerous Directing"	Nominated	
Mnet Asian Music Awards	2005	Best Female Artist	"Two Of Us"	Nominated	
Mnet Asian Music Awards	2007	Best Female Artist	"My Love"	Nominated	
Mnet Asian Music Awards	2009	Best Female Artist	"Shake"	Nominated	
SBS Gayo Daejeon	2005	Dance Award	Chae Yeon	Won	
SBS Gayo Daejeon	2006	Dance Award	Chae Yeon	Won	
