= Twintelle =

Fictional character in the video game Arms

- Arms character
- Twintelle as she appears in Arms
- First game: Arms (2017)
- Created by: Kosuke Yabuki
- Voiced by: Adeyto

In-universe information
- Nationality: French

Twintelle (Japanese: ツインテーラ, romanized: Tsuintēra) is a character in the 2017 video game Arms by Nintendo for the Nintendo Switch. Unlike other playable characters in Arms, who fight using their arms, Twintelle fights using her hair. She is depicted as a femme fatale and a celebrity. The design process for her was more complicated than the others in Arms, as producer Kosuke Yabuki wished to consult Nintendo's American and European branches in an effort to represent people of different backgrounds and national origins.

She was first revealed in May 2017 Nintendo Direct, where she quickly became a fan favorite and a popular Black character in video games. Twintelle has been the subject of generally positive reception as early as her reveal, resulting in her being the subject of fan art. Yabuki was positively surprised by her popularity, which led to the designers adding her to a free demo of Arms.

== Concept and creation ==
Twintelle was first revealed during a May 17, 2017 Nintendo Direct. She is a Black French person, and has dark brown skin and large, silver-and-pink pigtails. French artist Adeyto was cast to voice her. Unlike other fighters who use their arms, Twintelle fights using her hair. Twintelle is depicted as a femme fatale, a confident, attractive woman, and a famous, award-winning actress. She, along with the rest of the cast in Arms, is regarded as a protagonist of the game by its producer.

Arms producer Kosuke Yabuki described spending more time on designing Twintelle than on other characters in the game, contrasting her design which intentionally tried to be different with more straight-forward characters such as Ninjara. The initial concept only had one detail decided on, which was a character fighting with hair. The design team wanted to represent different countries and backgrounds, leading them to reach out to staff at Nintendo of America and Nintendo of Europe to get ideas for a character from a different background, providing them sketches to help. Yabuki designed her to have a muscular build. He enjoyed the character, believing that characters like Twintelle were uncommon in Nintendo games, and was particularly happy to have made what he considers to be a strong female character.

== Appearances ==
Twintelle first appeared in Arms as a playable character and one of the Grand Prix contestants. She is the only occurrence of someone with the ARMS gene having the mutation occur in their hair. Attempts at figuring this out by the ARMS Lab have failed due to her refusing to cooperate. Twintelle owns Cinema Deux, which is one of the stages where players can fight each other in Arms. She later appeared in the 2018 video game Super Smash Bros. Ultimate as a Spirit, a form of collectible.

== Reception ==
Since her appearance in Arms, Twintelle has received generally positive reception, which made producer Yabuki happy, though he was surprised by how popular she became. Along with Min Min and Ninjara, Twintelle is often regarded as one of the most popular Arms characters by fans. In a 2017 poll conducted by NintendoLife, Twintelle was ranked number one by readers as their favorite Arms fighter. Twintelle's popularity led to Nintendo including her in Arms's "Global Testpunch," a free temporary online video game demo. Critics, including Allegra Frank and Gita Jackson, suggested that her popularity was derived in part from her hair, outfit, attractiveness, and "calm, collected" personality. Writer Xavier Harding felt that the amount of fanart of Twintelle suggested that she would prove to be a popular Nintendo character. USgamer writer Matt Kim called her the "star of ARMS" and said he had "fallen in love" with her. She has been suggested for inclusion in Super Smash Bros. Ultimate by critics, including Xavier Harding, Paul Tassi, Brian Shea, and Will Greenwald. When Min Min, a fellow Arms character, was added to Ultimate as a DLC playable character, fans of Twintelle were disappointed and upset that she was not added instead.

Reception towards her representation as a woman and as a Black person was mixed. Mic writer Tanya DePass was unhappy with Twintelle's design, criticizing the fact that she was a "brown, female character with weaponized hair." She compared the idea of "weaponized hair" to real-world discrimination against Black people for their natural hairstyles, suggesting that Twintelle's hair was part of a greater issue in video games with the handling of Black people's hair. Paste Magazine writer Shonte Daniels responded to this article; Daniels felt the argument had merit, but exclaimed that Twintelle made her feel empowered. She felt that the character's hair deconstructed the idea of "weaponized hair," arguing that she "fights alongside it" instead of against it. She compared Twintelle to Black female athletes such as tennis player Serena Williams, who touched upon how she used to dislike her muscular body, but in time grew to love it due to how it has helped achieve her goals. Daniels argued that Twintelle has similar pride, and that she flaunts her hair in spite of criticism. Daniels went on to name her as one of the best new video game characters in 2017. Ashley Mika from Pop Culture Uncovered has cited Depass' criticisms as valid as well while also arguing, much like Daniels, that Twintelle's confidence, strength, pride and beauty makes her a good representation of black women and their hair.

Alisha Karabinus, Assistant Professor of Writing and Digital Studies at Grand Valley State University, acknowledged that Twintelle had potentially problematic elements, but felt that they are not insurmountable issues, and said the key issue is a lack of representation and that there should be more playable Black female characters in video games. Nerd Much? writer Janet Garcia called Twintelle the most unique character design of the Nintendo Switch generation, praising her design as both "sexualized and empowered." She further discusses that Twintelle's sex appeal works in Arms because the other female characters are not sexualized. She added that Twintelle's backstory helps justify her sexualization and that it makes her seem "badass". However, she acknowledges that the femme fatale design that Twintelle incorporates is too commonly applied to women of color.
