= Nora Hirano =

Japanese comedian (born 1978)

- 平野 ノラ
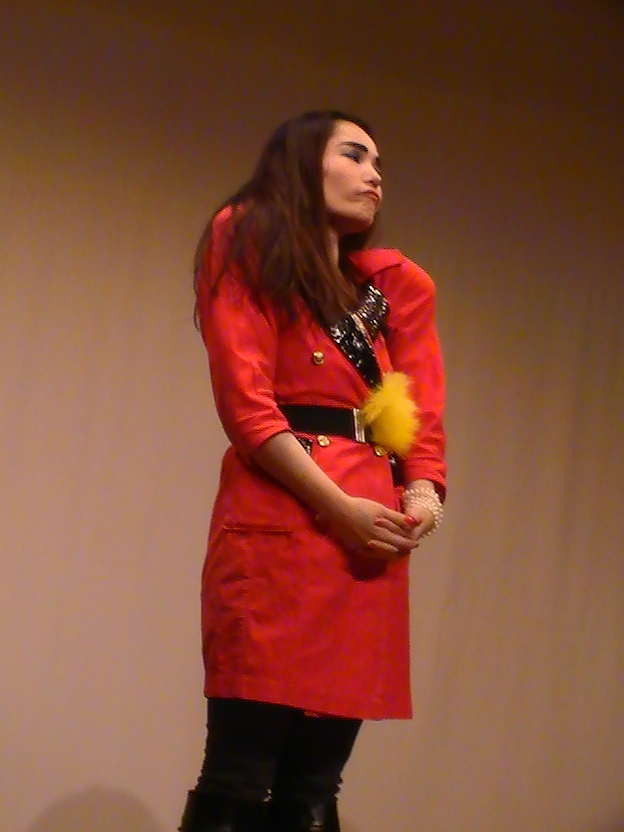
- Hirano in 2016
- Born: Chiaki Hirano; October 20, 1978 (age 47); Tokyo, Japan
- Education: Watanabe Comedy School
- Occupation: Comedian
- Years active: 2011–
- Agent: Watanabe Entertainment
- Known for: GNN: Geinin News Network
- Height: 1.62 m (5 ft 4 in)
- Website: Official profile

Nora Hirano (平野 ノラ, Hirano Nora; born 20 October 1978) is a Japanese comedian. Her real name is Chiaki Hirano (平野 千秋, Hirano Chiaki). She is represented with Watanabe Entertainment.

== Personal life ==
Hirano married in 2017. On 30 October 2020, she revealed she was six months pregnant with her first child and is expected to give birth in February 2021.

== Filmography ==
=== TV series ===
Year	Title	Network	Notes	Ref.
2012	Waratte Iitomo!	Fuji TV	Appeared in "Air Performance Ō Kettei-sen"	
2014	Zenryaku, Daitoku-san	CTV		
2014	Onegai! Morning	TV Asahi	"15-byō de Megasameru Ippatsu Gag Ranking"; occasional appearances	
2014	Cream Nanchara	TV Asahi		
2014	Monomane Grand Prix	NTV		
2014	Akeru na Kiken	TBS		
2015	Un Nan Kyokugen Neta Battle! The Iromonea Warawa setara 100 man-en	TBS		
2015	Onegai! Ranking	TV Asahi		
2015	GNN: Geinin News Network		Appeared in the fourth, fifth, and sixth "Sugu Iu Ōzakettei-sen"	
2015	Masakame TV	NHK-G		
2015	Hayadoki!	TBS		
2015	Tonpachi Audrey	Fuji TV		
2015	Guruguru Ninety Nine	NTV		
2015	Sweet Den of Premiere	Fuji TV		
2016	Sakurai Ariyoshi Abunai Yakai	TBS		
2016	Tensai Bakabon: Kazoku no Kizuna	NTV	As a coffee shop customer	
2016	Chō Hamaru! Bakushō Chara Parade	Fuji TV		
2016	Honnou Z	CBC		
2016	All-Star Thanksgiving '16 Aki	TBS		
2016	SMAP×SMAP	Fuji TV		

=== Others ===
DVD

Year	Title
2014	Untouchable Shibata no "Warota wwww": Chōzetsu omoshiroi no ni Mattaku Shira re tenai Geinin-tachi

== Discography ==
=== Singles ===
Year	Title	Ref.
2016	"OK! Bubbly!! feat. Bubbly Minako"	

=== DVD ===
Year	Title	Notes	Ref.
2015	Bubble wa, soko made Kite iru Zo!	First solo DVD	
