= Megumi Yasu =

Japanese entertainer and actress (born 1981)

- 安 めぐみ
- Born: December 22, 1981 (age 44); Fuchū, Tokyo, Japan
- Other names: Me (めぇ); Memetan (めめたん); Yasu (やす); Megu no Yasu (めぐ の やす)
- Occupations: Entertainer; actress
- Agent: Harmony Promotion
- Height: 1.58 m (5 ft 2 in) (2008)
- Spouse: Takahiro Azuma (m. 2011)
- Children: 2

Megumi Yasu (安 めぐみ, Yasu Megumi; born December 22, 1981, in Fuchū, Tokyo, Japan) is a Japanese entertainer and actress who is represented by Harmony Promotion.

== Filmography ==
=== TV series ===
==== Regular appearances ====
Year	Title	Network	Notes
2006	Cunning no Dai-yasu Kichijitsu!	BS Fuji	
2013	Go Go! Smile!	CBC	Wednesday regular
2013	Shokunin no Men Kōbō	BS Asahi	Navigator

==== Quasi-regular appearances ====
Title	Network	Notes
Pit Tanko Kan Kan	TBS	
Be Bop! High Heel	ABC	
Somewhere Street	NHK BS Premium	

==== Former regular appearances ====
Year	Title	Network	Notes
2001	Tonight 2	TV Asahi	
2002	King's Brunch	TBS	
2003	Nekketsu! Specia Chūgaku	Space Shower TV	
2003	Uchimura Produce	TV Asahi	Quasi-regular assistant
2006	Nanmon Kaiketsu! Go Kinjo no Sokojikara	NHK G TV	
2006	Pop Jam	NHK G TV	
2006	The Dream Press Company	TBS	Irregular appearances
2006	Ping Pong!	TBS	
2007	Science Zero	NHK E TV	
2007	The Quiz Man	TV Asahi	Quasi-regular appearances
	Hakken!	Fuji TV	Commentator
2011	Challenge! Hobby	NHK E TV	

==== Dramas ====
Year	Title	Role	Network	Notes
2006	Tantei Boogie	Megumi Yasu	Tokyo MX	Episode 8
2006	Bengoshi no Kuzu	Teruyo Yaga	TBS	Episode 1
2007	Judge: Shima no Saibankan Funtō-ki	Keiko Mizutani	NHK G TV	
2008	The Negotiator	Rumiko Mimura	TV Asahi	
2008	Hisho no Kagami	Yu Kagami	TV Tokyo	Lead role
2009	Hanchō: Jinnan-sho Asaka Han	Yukiko Yamaguchi	TBS	
2012	Answer: Keishichō Kenshō Sōsa-kan	Reiko Takagi	TV Asahi	Episode 6
2013	Kōchijo no Joi 2	Misa Akimoto	TV Asahi	

==== Advertisements ====
Year	Title	Notes
2000	NTT DoCoMo "Gokazoku Ōen Waribiki"	
2002	Nichiryo Banking "Sayaka"	
2002	Acom "Uchūbito Series"	
2005	Sanyo Shinpan "Pocket Bank"	
2006	Asahi Soft Drinks "Wakamusha"	
2007	Central Nippon Expressway Company "Tōmei Expressway"	
2008	Glico Dairy	
2008	Up Garage "High Jump"	
2009	Ion Cosmetics "Onsen Mushi Towel Biyō" "Bi Set"	
2011	Kirishima Shuzo "Kuro Kirishima"	

=== Radio series ===
Year	Title	Role	Network	Notes
2002	Ore-tachi Yatte Masu	MBS Radio		
2003	TR2	J-Wave		
2003	Oshaberi Yatte Masu	K'z Station		
2006	All Night Nippon	NBS		
2010	Daiichikōshō Presents Premier Dam Sing Sing Party	Tokyo FM		
2011	Kirishima Relax Time Shōchū Dining J-Fairy Yasu	Tokyo FM		
2014	Yo Mi Ki Ka Se	Tokyo FM		

=== Films ===
Year	Title	Role	Notes	Ref(s)
2001	Akuma ga Sumu ie 2001	Emi	Episode 1	
2001	Hiroshi Daimon Tanken-tai Tsuchinoko Densetsu			
2004	Tenshi Kyūbin		Direct-to-video film	
2005	Shinku	Kanako's friend A		
2007	Kowai Warabeuta Ura no Shō	Kyoko Uda	Lead role	
2010	Classico		Narrator	
2010	Kōshō Hito the Movie Time Limit Kōdo 10,000 m no Zunō-sen	Rumiko Mimura		
2011	Hankyū Densha	Hinako Komine		
2012	Kuroneko Lucy	Sachiko Kamoshida		

== Personal life ==
Yasu married comedian Takahiro Azuma in December 21, 2011. Her husband announced through his agency that Yasu had given birth to their first child, a daughter, born in March 17, 2015. On September 1, 2023, the couple jointly announced through SNS that they are expecting their second child, which is due around January next year. Yasu gave birth in January 24, 2024.
