= Nyanko Star =

Japanese comedian duo

- Nyanko Suta (にゃんこスター)
- Employer: Watanabe Entertainment

Comedy career
- Years active: 2017–
- Members: Super Sansuke (Tsukkomi); Angora Sonchō (Boke)

Nyanko Star (にゃんこスター Nyanko Suta) is a Japanese comedy duo (kombi) consisting of Super Sansuke (スーパー3助) and Angora Sonchō (アンゴラ村長). They were formed on May 7, 2017, and in rose to fame in October of the same year when they finished second in the televised conte competition "King of Conte". Nyanko Star is employed by Watanabe Entertainment.

== Members ==
- Super Sansuke (スーパー3助), real name Ryōta Ichizuri (一釣良太) Born May 3, 1983, in Sasebo, Nagasaki. Plays the tsukkomi.
- Angora Sonchō (アンゴラ村長), real name Ayumi Satō (佐藤歩実) Born May 17, 1994, in Honjō, Saitama. Plays the boke. She graduated from Waseda University and graduation thesis was on Takeshi Kitano's work.

== Representative work ==
=== Skits ===
- Skipping rope: She skips a rope to a popular song by Ai Otsuka, but right before the climax, she suddenly abandons the rope and begins to dance with a funny face. He gets annoyed by her behavior but quickly finds himself attracted to it.
- Hula hoop: Ditto
- Umbrella: Ditto

=== Music ===
- Go-Sign is One Coin (released from Avex): Collaboration with "Café Latte Fountain Park": Angora Sonchou handled the lyrics and choreography.

=== Teleplay ===
- In the living room (TV Tokyo)

== Critical reaction ==
Hitoshi Matsumoto said, "I need some hatefulness to comedians and they have a proper amount of it," and Larry Toda has described them as having great potential. Shinobu Sakagami, an actor starring in "Mysterious Dog Tonton," said that he could not understand what was funny in their performance.
