= Naomichi Hirama =

Japanese footballer

Personal information
- Full name: Naomichi Hirama
- Date of birth: July 6, 1987 (age 39)
- Place of birth: Kanagawa, Japan
- Height: 1.66 m (5 ft 5 1/2 in)
- Position: Midfielder

Youth career
- 2006–2009: Aichi Gakuin University

Senior career*
Years	Team	Apps	(Gls)
2010–2015	YSCC Yokohama	95	(9)
Total		95	(9)
- * Club domestic league appearances and goals

Naomichi Hirama (平間 直道, Hirama Naomichi; born July 6, 1987) is a former Japanese football player.

== Playing career ==
Naomichi Hirama played for YSCC Yokohama from 2010 to 2015.
