= Arms (video game) =

2017 video game

- Home menu icon, depicting Spring Man getting punched by Ribbon Girl (arm visible only)
- Developer: Nintendo EPD (Note: Additional work by Bandai Namco Studios. Nintendo Switch 2 upgrade developed by Panic Button.)
- Publisher: Nintendo
- Directors: Kenta Sato; Masaaki Ishikawa; Shintaro Jikumaru
- Producer: Kosuke Yabuki
- Designer: Shintaro Jikumaru
- Programmer: Kenta Sato
- Artist: Masaaki Ishikawa
- Composers: Atsuko Asahi; Yasuaki Iwata
- Platform: Nintendo Switch
- Release: June 16, 2017; 9 years ago
- Genre: Fighting
- Modes: Single-player, multiplayer

Arms (Note: Japanese: アームズ, Hepburn: Āmuzu; stylized as ARMS) is a 2017 fighting game developed and published by Nintendo for the Nintendo Switch. The game differentiates itself from standard fighting games with its unconventional fighting system where every playable character fights with long range attacks and up to four players can choose a fighter and battle using a variety of extendable, weaponized arms to knock out opponents in a three-dimensional arena. Arms received generally favorable reviews from critics and sold over two million copies by July 2018.

== Gameplay ==
A match being played between Spring Man and Ribbon Girl

Arms is a 3D fighting sports game in which up to four players can control one of a variety of fighters, with the player able to perform basic fighting actions using extendable arms such as punching, throwing, blocking and dodging. Each fighter starts with three unique Arms that can be selected in battle, but the use of all other fighters' Arms can be unlocked in the Get Arms mode. All fighters also have unique attributes in combat. When the attack meter is fully charged, players are able to unleash a high-damage "rush attack" against their opponents. Players can also charge their attacks to temporarily increase damage and utilize elemental effects. Each character has a different set of abilities and unique Arms for different strategies. Players are able to use the system's Joy-Con motion controls or standard button inputs with controllers such as the Pro Controller to operate each Arm individually. Players are also able to customize their Arm load outs, with each Arm being able to be selected independently. Every Arm is different with elemental attributes and varying weights that affect gameplay. Up to four players are able to play in a single match, either in a three or four-way free-for-all, or in a two-on-two mode in which teammates are tethered together.

Besides the standard fighting mode, Arms features multiple other modes: Versus, Grand Prix, and a variety of Battle modes. In Grand Prix, players take on a set of 10 matches against computer-controlled fighters to win the championship belt. Battle mode consists of volleyball and basketball modes, a target breaking mode, and a survival mode. Players can also play online in a party match lobby with up to 20 players, or in one-on-one ranked matches. Arms featured ten playable fighters at launch, with five additional fighters added via post-release updates.

== Characters ==
Arms features fifteen playable fighters, with five of them being released as downloadable content.

- Spring Man: A hot-blooded fighter who has a strong determination to win the ARMS Grand Prix, as he dreams of becoming the champion and defeating Max Brass. His arms are made of metallic coils. Nickname: The Bouncer.
- Ribbon Girl: famous young pop star, popular for her singing and dancing, she belongs to the Ribbonic Records. Her arms are made of ribbons. Nickname: The Airess.
- Ninjara: A student of Rasen Ninjutsu University, a college for ninjas, and is competing for his senior project. His arms are made of chains. Nickname: The Student of Stealth.
- Master Mummy: A heavyweight mummy man reanimate by Dr. Coyle, he enters the ARMS Grand Prix in order to reunite with his family. His arms are made of bandages. Nickname: The Grim Creeper.
- Min Min: A martial artist who serves as the poster girl for her family's ramen shop (the Mintendo Noodle House), she enters the tournament to promote the restaurant. Her arms are made of noodles. Nickname: The Ramen Bomber.
- Mechanica: A teenage inventor who wasn't born with the ARMS gene, but wanted to compete and built a Mini-Mecha battle suit to pilot in order to do so. Nickname: The Scrapyard Scrapper.
- Twintelle: A famous movie star diva whose ARMS manifested in the form of long locks in her hair. Enters the ARMS Grand Prix to add the champion belt to her award collection. Nickname: The Silver Screen Queen.
- Byte & Barq: A beach patrol tag team of clockwork robot police officer and robot dog. Byte`s arms resemble clockwork mainsprings. Nickname: The Clockwork Cops.
- Kid Cobra: A professional snakeboarder, streamer and leader of the Naja Crew whose motivation on entering the tournament is to increase the views for his livestreams. His arms resemble snakes. Nickname: The Speed Demon.
- Helix: A green slime creature created by Dr. Coyle at ARMS Laboratories. Despite being considered a failure, he competes in the Grand Prix to prove the scientists he's worthy of further research. His arms resemble DNA double helix. Nickname: The "Man" of Mystery.
- Max Brass: (Note: DLC) The head of the ARMS league, Champion of the Grand Prix, and the final boss in lower difficulties. A veteran of ARMS fighting, age hasn't slowed him down and he's looking for new fighters to mentor. His arms are made of belts. Nickname: The Commish.
- Lola Pop: A clown who has traveled the world doing street performances and hopes to one day open a circus of her own and enters the Grand Prix for that purpose. Her arms are made of candy. Nickname: The Sucker Puncher.
- Misango: A proud, spiritual warrior who enters the tournament to prove that his people have the best fighting technique in the world. His arms are made of woven fabric. Nickname: The Spirited Fighter.
- Springtron: A robotic duplicate of Spring Man created to advertise ARMS labs and discover the other fighters' weaknesses. His arms are made of metallic coils. Nickname: The Mean Machine.
- Dr. Coyle: Head scientist of the ARMS Laboratories, since a young age she dedicated her life to research ARMS, she has conducted experiments on herself and enters the Grand Prix to prove she's the greatest fighter and scientist. Her arms are made of copper. Nickname: The Rad Scientist.
- Hedlok: A robot in the shape of a metallic mask created by Dr. Coyle in a research facility, it was originally created to spar with fighters to hone their skills, but after activation it gained self- awareness before running amok and the final boss on higher difficulty. Nickname: The Secret Weapon.

== Development ==
The game was developed by Nintendo's Entertainment Planning & Development division with assistance from Bandai Namco Studios. In the beginning, the game began as a wish to see if a behind-the-camera perspective could work in a fighting game. To make this idea work, the main feature of extendable arms was implemented, with Yabuki stating "Let's talk about a game I know about very well - Mario Kart. Something appears in the distance and you steer in relation to that - that's the basic structure of the game," in reference to Mario Kart and how its gameplay helped influence Arms.

Early on, the idea of featuring staple Nintendo characters such as Link and Mario was considered. However, the aesthetic of the game, especially with the concept of extendable arms, clashed with them, and it was eventually decided that a new cast of characters be created. The possibility of adding characters from Punch-Out!! was also considered but the team was concerned about alienating fans of that franchise and potentially confusing new players.

Character designs started with the arms first with the team working backwards to decide what type of character would possess it, for instance the character of Helix, started with the idea of a fighter whose arms were DNA strands, although the team initially did not know much else about him. Most fighters were designed to fill a gameplay need, although there are some exceptions where a design came first. An early concept for the game had the characters using external devices to punch their opponents; however, this was later dropped in favor of the characters extending their actual arms. Art director Masaaki Ishikawa said that the game's art style was largely influenced by Dragon Ball and Akira. Yabuki has stated that, as opposed to one single protagonist, all of the characters are the protagonists of the game.

== Release ==
The game was announced at the Nintendo Switch Presentation on January 12, 2017, and was released worldwide on June 16, 2017. Prior to the game's release, a multiplayer demo known as the "Arms Global Testpunch" was made available for download on the Nintendo eShop, with players being able to test the online gameplay during twelve separate hour-long sessions.

Irregular post-release updates were released featuring new playable characters, stages, and arms. These free releases of additional content followed Splatoon's update model, while the Testpunch demo was also available for use multiple times. The game received new characters and stages by way of downloadable content until December 2017, when Nintendo announced that they would no longer be adding new content to the game other than balance updates.

In May 2018, a limited-time demo of the game was released on the eShop. Unlike the Testpunch events, this demo only featured offline modes of single-player and local multiplayer with a limited selection of characters and Arms to choose from.

== Reception ==
Reception

Aggregate scores
Aggregator	Score
Metacritic	77/100
OpenCritic	70% recommend

Review scores
Publication	Score
Destructoid	7/10
Edge	9/10
Electronic Gaming Monthly	4/5
Famitsu	33/40
Game Informer	8.25/10
GameSpot	7/10
GamesRadar+	4.5/5
Hardcore Gamer	4.5/5
IGN	8/10
Nintendo Life	9/10
Nintendo World Report	8/10
Polygon	8/10

Arms has been compared to the boxing minigame from Wii Sports. Jack Sheperd of The Independent stated after playing it at a Switch hands-on event that it was one of the "most impressive" games on display. Edge compared Arms with other Nintendo titles and thought that "Arms is to the fighting game what Splatoon is to the online shooter or Mario Kart to the driving game".

The game received "generally favorable" reviews, according to review aggregator website Metacritic. Brandon Graeber from IGN praised the game's complexity and addictive nature, but noted the game's lack of content at launch. Michael McWhertor from Polygon applauded the game's concept, which he described as creative, and that the game reminded him of the Punch-Out!! series, stating that Arms could become Nintendo's next big franchise. Kallie Plagge from GameSpot praised the character roster, but criticized the game's steep learning curve.

Multiple publications listed the game as one of the best of 2017. In Game Informer's Reader's Choice Best of 2017 Awards, the game placed third for "Best Fighting Game". It was also nominated for the same category in IGN's Best of 2017 Awards. The game has seen a small, but dedicated esports scene across multiple regions.

=== Sales ===
Arms debuted at number two on the UK sales charts, behind Horizon Zero Dawn. It was number two in Australia, behind the same game. It sold 100,652 physical copies during its first week of release in Japan, and debuted at number one on the all-format sales charts. By September 30, 2018, the game had sold over 2.1 million copies worldwide. The 2023 CESA Games White Papers revealed that ARMS had sold 2.72 million units, as of December 31, 2022.

=== Awards ===
Year	Award	Category	Result	Ref.
2017	Game Critics Awards	Best Fighting Game	Nominated	
2017	Golden Joystick Awards	Nintendo Game of the Year	Nominated	
2017	The Game Awards 2017	Best Fighting Game	Nominated	
2018	21st Annual D.I.C.E. Awards	Fighting Game of the Year	Nominated	

== Legacy ==
In 2017, a graphic novel by Dark Horse Comics based on Arms was under production. It was written by Ian Flynn. The comic was reportedly cancelled in March 2021. Several elements of the game exist in the 2018 crossover fighting game Super Smash Bros. Ultimate, such as Spring Man appearing as a summonable Assist Trophy and several characters cameoing as collectable Spirits. In addition, a downloadable content pack featuring Min Min as a playable fighter, Spring Stadium as a stage, and 18 music tracks from the game was released on June 29, 2020. An Amiibo figure of Min Min was released on April 29, 2022.
