= TIM (comedy duo) =

Japanese comedy duo

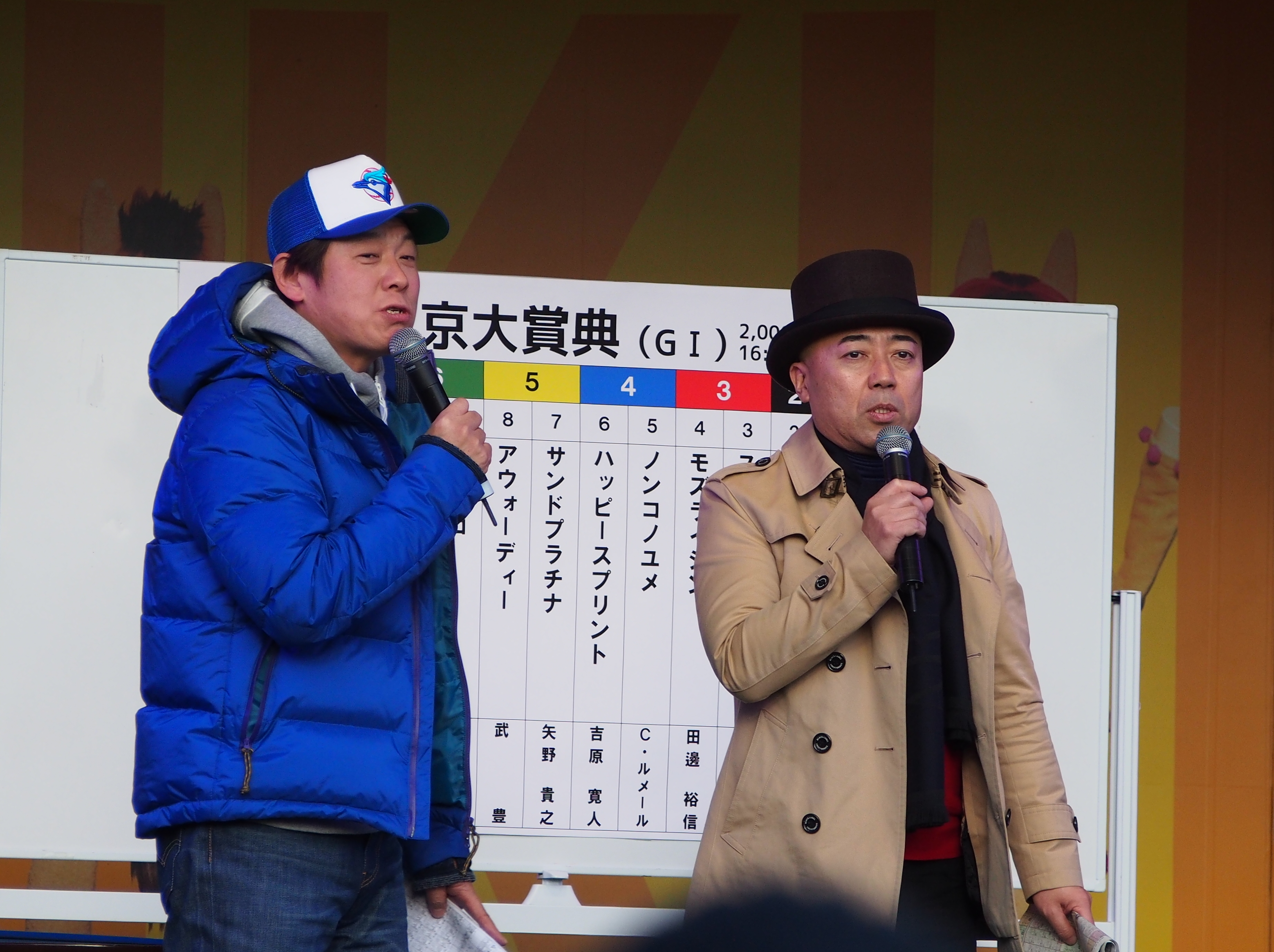
Red Yoshida and Golgo Matsumoto (2016)

TIM is the name of a Japanese comedy unit (kombi). The unit consists of Red Yoshida (レッド吉田, Reddo Yoshida; born October 30, 1965) and Golgo Matsumoto (ゴルゴ松本, Gorugo Matsumoto; born April 17, 1967). They are most famous for their antics on the owarai show Uchimura Produce, as well as various children's shows such as Tensai Terebi-kun Max (天才てれびくんMAX). The two are also members of the owarai and music group No Plan. Red, the tsukkomi, is originally from Kyoto, and Golgo, the boke, hails from Saitama.

As tsukkomi, Red is easily embarrassed and blushes quickly, which is where he gets the name. At the end of every episode of Uchimura Produce, the host, Teruyoshi Uchimura would shout, "And today's Red is..." to which Red would insert some strange (often embarrassingly un-funny) pseudo-English or meaningless Japanese phrase. Occasionally Red was given his own corner, "Red's World" (a play on Summers' Ōtake's "Ōtake World") in which he would perform weird and nonsensical ad libs (e.g. "Ariga-ton, ton, Washington!" and "Pan! Pan! This is Japan!"). Red is a graduate of Bukkyo University in Kyoto.

Golgo (named after the famous manga Golgo 13) is the boke and is also known for being confusing and rather odd. Golgo is known for his physical and set-up gags, contrasting the more verbal and corny mental humor of Red. Formerly, Golgo was often seen with an un-lit cigar on-air (although he hates tobacco), and he also always sports a small, Chaplin-esque moustache. A famous gag of Golgo's has him crying out, "Ah... Inochi!" and then spreading out his arms and lifting one leg in an attempt to mimic the shape of the kanji inochi (命), meaning "life".

== History ==
TIM was formed by the two in 1994 as an acronym for Time Is Money after close apartments in Tokyo brought the two together. Both went to the Japanese National High School Baseball Championship; Red with the winner of the Kyoto Prefectural Baseball Tournament, and Golgo with the winner for Saitama.
