= Summers (comedy duo) =

Japanese comedian

- Samāzu (さまぁ～ず)
- Employer: Horipro Inc.

Comedy career
- Years active: 1988– (formed in Tokyo)
- Members: Masakazu Mimura (Tsukkomi); Kazuki Ōtake (Boke)

Notes
- Same year/generation as: Bakusho Mondai; Hosei Tsukitei

Summers (さまぁ〜ず) are a Japanese comedy duo. They were frequent guests on the former late night conte show Uchimura Produce (Uchi-P) and the variety show Lincoln, as well as many other Japanese variety and quiz shows.

They were two members of the musical comedy group NO PLAN, along with Teruyoshi Uchimura. The group disbanded in 2006.

== Otake and Mimura ==
The group consists of Kazuki Ōtake (大竹一樹), born December 8, 1967, and Masakazu Mimura (三村マサカズ), born June 8, 1967. Both comedians were born in Sumida, Tokyo.

Usually functioning as the boke, Ōtake is famous for his ability to spontaneously spurt out meaningless, yet funny lines, and for his crude jokes (shimoneta). His amazing ability to entertain audiences with strange, nonsensical gags was dubbed "Ōtake World" on Uchi-P. He was told many times that he looked like his partner Mimura, and decided to wear glasses in order to distinguish himself. He does not, however, normally wear glasses. He enjoys wearing short sleeves over long sleeved T-shirts.

As the tsukkomi of the group, Mimura is also known to perform tsukkomi on himself, and was given the nickname "Kantō's #1 Tsukkomi King". He attempted to become a boke once on Uchi-P, but was unsuccessful, as he continually resorted to using shimoneta. He is a prolific game show contestant, and has won ¥1,000,000 on Quiz$Millionaire, the Japanese equivalent of Who Wants to Be a Millionaire?. He is also considered a decent manga artist.

Mimura is also a frequent target of dokkiri subjected on him by Ōtake and the rest of the crew on Uchi-P. He jokes that he has become so accustomed to being surprised by dokkiri that he can predict when he is going to be fooled in the morning before he leaves his home to go to work.

== History ==
As friends, Ōtake and Mimura decided to become manzai-shi on a leisurely trip to Horipro in 1988. They began performing under the name "Bacardi", but in 2000, after numerous appearances on the "New Un-Nan's Feel So Nice" show, they were forced to change their name to "Summers" by Teruyoshi Uchimura. Cream Stew was also forced to change their name in the same way.

Mimura's style of tsukkomi became famous—he frequently suffixes his sentences with kayo!, a very strong question form, comparable to the English, "The hell?"—and Summers has become increasingly successful ever since their big break in 2001. They also enjoyed moderate success with their books さまぁ〜ずの悲しいダジャレ (Summers' Sad Bad Dajare) and さまぁ〜ずの悲しい俳句 (Summers' Sad Haiku), published by Takarajimasha.
