= Kazuki Ōtake =

Japanese comedian

- 大竹 一樹
- Born: December 8, 1967 (age 58); Sumida, Tokyo, Japan
- Spouse: Hitomi Nakamura

Comedy career
- Years active: 1988 – Present
- Medium: Owarai; Television

Notes
- Same year/generation as: Hosei Tsukitei

Kazuki Ōtake (大竹 一樹, Ōtake Kazuki; born December 8, 1967 in Sumida, Tokyo) is a Japanese comedian. He is a former member of Japanese band UltraCats and current member of owarai group Summers.

== Filmography ==
- Peanuts (2006)
- Moomins on the Riviera (2015)
