= Udo Suzuki =

Japanese musician and comedian

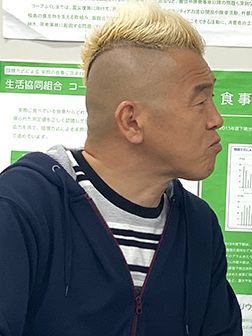
Image of Udo Suzuki

Udo Suzuki (ウド鈴木; real name: Hideki Suzuki (鈴木 任紀), born January 19, 1970), also known as Udo, is a Japanese musician and comedian. He used to be a member of the Japanese band UltraCats and is a member of the owarai group Kyaeen (キャイ～ン).

== See also ==
- List of Japanese comedians
