= Kyaeen =

Japanese comedy duo

- Kyaīn (キャイ〜ン)
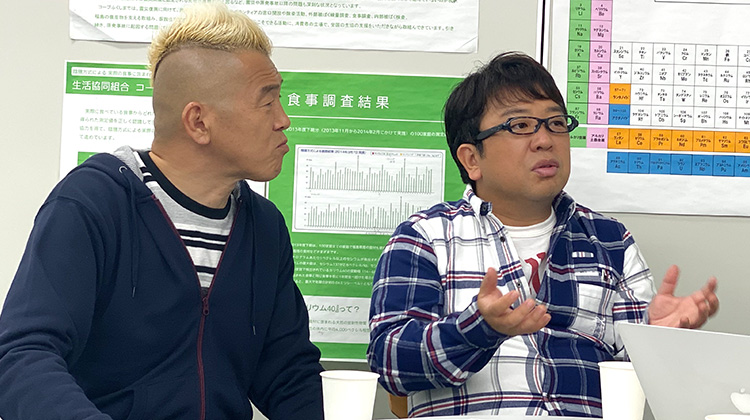
- Employer: Asai Kikaku

Comedy career
- Years active: 1991–
- Members: Hiroyuki Amano (Tsukkomi); Udo Suzuki (Boke)

Notes
- Same year/generation as: Chihara Kyodai, Fujiwara (Udo); Cream Stew, Yoiko, Ninety-nine (Amano)

Kyaeen (キャイ〜ン, Kyaīn) is a Japanese comedy duo (kombi) consisting of Udo Suzuki (ウド鈴木) and Hiroyuki Amano (天野ひろゆき). They are employed by Asai Kikaku, a talent agency based in Tokyo.

Their kombi name was inspired by the happy squeals of female characters in manga. Amano thought of the idea, and Udo added the tilde which is used as an extension of a syllable in Asian cultures.

== Members ==
- Udo Suzuki (ウド鈴木) Born January 19, 1970 in Fujishima, Yamagata. Plays the boke. Known for his large frame, blonde crewcut hair, and gentle demeanor.
- Amano Hiroyuki (天野ひろゆき) Born March 24, 1970 in Okazaki, Aichi. Plays the tsukkomi and writes all their material. A good chef, he has held his own cooking segments on various television shows. Although he uses contact lenses, he wears thick eyeglass frames to add to his character.

== Hosted shows ==
- LINCOLN (リンカーン) (TBS)
- Katori Shingo no Tokujyō! Tensai Shingo (香取慎吾の特上!天声慎吾) (Nippon Television)
- Ima-ama (いまあま) (Nippon Television)
- Suzuki (すずき) (Television Kanagawa)
