= Cream Stew (comedy duo) =

Japanese comedy duo

- くりぃむしちゅー
- Employer: Natural Eight

Comedy career
- Years active: 1991 - Present
- Members: Shinya Ueda (Tsukkomi); Teppei Arita (Boke)

Notes
- Same year/generation as: Teruyuki Tsuchida; Kyaeen; Daimaou Kosaka

Cream Stew (くりぃむしちゅー) is the name of a Japanese comedy kombi consisting of two comedians, Shinya Ueda (上田晋也) and Teppei Arita (有田哲平). Originally from Kumamoto city, the pair first met in high school when Arita and Ueda found a common interest in pro wrestling. Both of them attended Waseda and Rikkyo Universities, but dropped out to pursue comedy.

More than 15 years later, Ueda and Arita are popular personalities on Japanese television, and can be seen performing daily, often on multiple shows in one day, sometimes on different channels simultaneously.

As with many Japanese kombi, one of the comedians is referred to as the boke, and the other the tsukkomi. As the boke, Arita is loud and prone to strange comments, while Ueda (sometimes called tempa, see note) is the more reasonable of the two, often criticizing Arita's remarks while setting up further jokes and often providing Arita with a one-man audience (even when nobody else is laughing). Ueda also distinguishes himself from most tsukkomi as the king of unchiku (うんちく), or the ability to lecture on about something that the speaker's audience really has no interest in whatsoever.

== Now showing ==
Cream Stew are currently listed as regulars on the following programs:

- くりぃむナントカ (Cream Something, Kuriimu Nantoka) on TV Asahi
- 痛快!明石家電視台 (Akashiya TV) on MBS
- ドリームビジョン (Dream Vision) on Nippon TV
- ズバリ言うわよ! (I'm gonna say it straight!, Zubari iu wa yo!) on TBS
- 知ってみて得するバラエティ シルシルミシル (The Variety Show to Know, Watch and be useful Shirushiru Mishiru) on TV Asahi
- タカトシ×くりぃむのペケ×ポン (Takatoshi×Cream's Pekepon) on Fuji TV
- 銭形金太郎 (Zenigata Kintarō) on TV Asahi
- 世界一受けたい授業 (The most useful class in the world, Sekai Ichi Uketai Jugyō) on Nippon TV
- おしゃれイズム (Style-ism, Oshare-izumu) on Nippon TV (Ueda)
- しゃべくり007 (Seven men who like talking, Shabekuri-seven) on Nippon TV
- キャッシュキャブ (Cash Cab) on Fuji TV
- くりぃむクイズ ミラクル9 (Cream Quiz Miracle 9) on TV Asahi

== See also ==
- Owarai

== Notes ==
天パ (tempa, from the word-phrase 天然パーマ, ten'nen paama, meaning 'natural perm') is a nickname given to many Japanese (usually males) who are born with naturally curly hair.
