= Ryo Fukawa =

Japanese musician and comedian (born 1974)

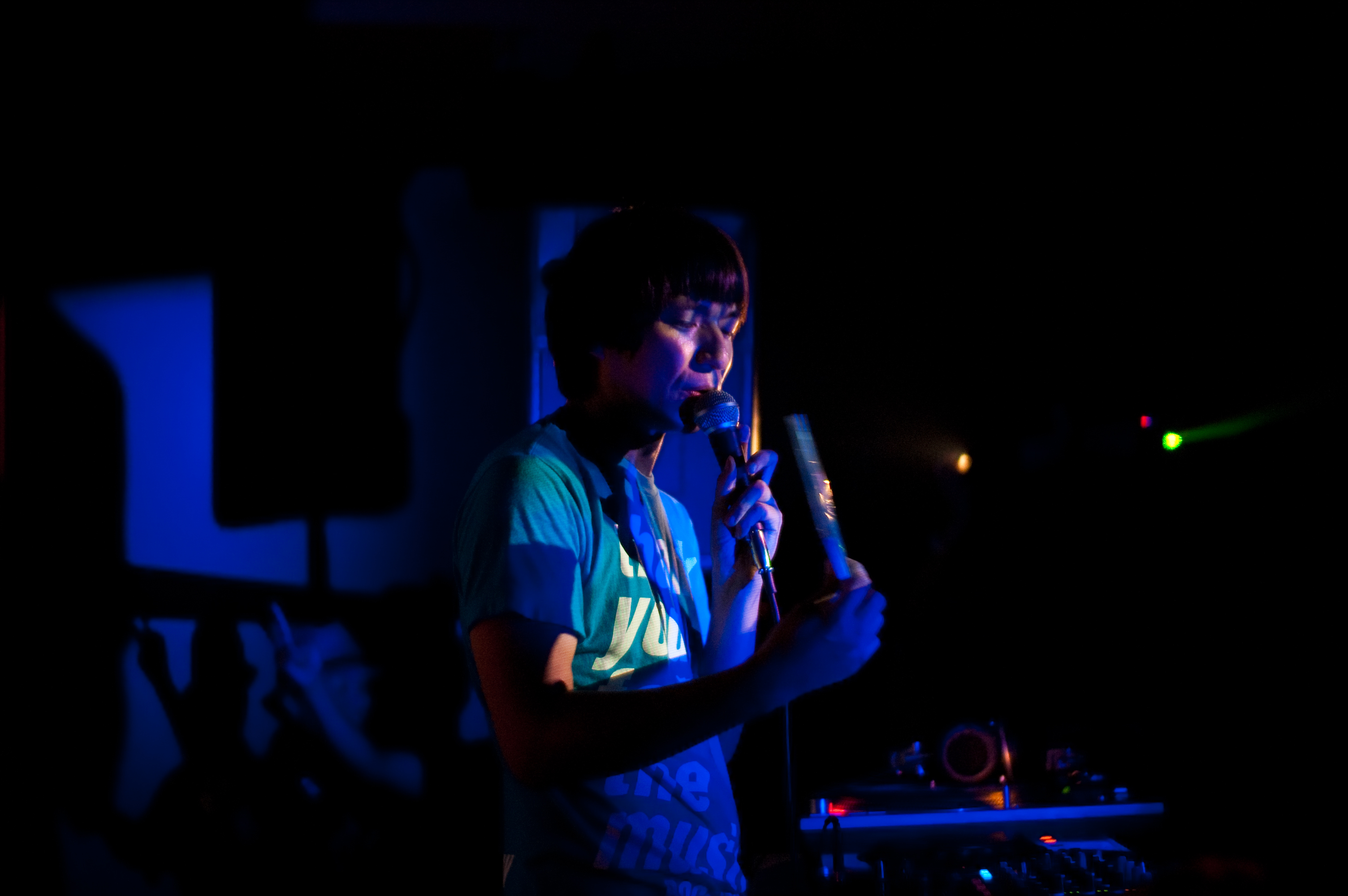
Fukawa working as the musician "ROCKETMAN". (2010)

Ryō Fukawa (ふかわりょう, Fukawa Ryō; born August 19, 1974, in Yokohama, Kanagawa), also known as ROCKETMAN, is a Japanese comedian and musician. He belongs to Watanabe Entertainment. On television he generally takes minor roles and is characterized by his childlike temperament and boyish looks. He is also a member of the owarai group No Plan.

Fukawa graduated from the Department of Economics at Keio University. He is cousin to manga artist Tetsuo Hara.

== Career ==
Ryo Fukawa, alongside Mika Mifune, hosted music-focused TV series Channel A (チャンネル エー) (stylized as channel a). It started airing on October 1, 1998 with the last episode airing on September 24, 2009.

== Filmography ==
=== Film ===
- The Samurai I Loved (2005), Kowada Ippei

=== Television ===
- The Shogunate Rebel (2027), Tokugawa Iesada
