= Naoki Nokubo =

Japanese variety star (born 1981)

- 野久保 直樹
- Born: 14 May 1981 (age 45); Iwata, Shizuoka, Japan
- Occupations: Actor; television personality
- Years active: 2005–present
- Known for: Former Shuchishin and Aladdin member
- Notable work: Legend of the Galactic Heroes Chapter II: Free Planetary Alliance
- Television: Drama; Panda ga Machi ni yattekuru; Variety; Quiz! Hexagon II
- Height: 175 cm (5 ft 9 in)
- Website: Naoki Nokubo official site

Naoki Nokubo (野久保 直樹, Nokubo Naoki; born 14 May 1981) is a Japanese variety star from Iwata, Shizuoka. He is also in management at Breakpoint Inc.

== Biography ==
Nokubo was born in Iwata, Shizuoka, formerly known as Toyodachô, Iwata-gun, Shizuoka.

After graduating from Kinshin High School, Nokubo attended acting school in Tokyo with the intention of entering the entertainment industry. He later signed with Watanabe Entertainment, and, in August 2004, became one of the first members selected for the D-Boys group at the First D-Boys Audition. This event selected the members for the upcoming young actors' group.

Nokubo appeared in the television drama Mother & Lover in October 2004. In 2005, he appeared in H2~Kimi toita Hibi, which is considered his most notable debut work. He appeared on the "Entertainment Industry's Underwater Swimming Competition" section of the show Quiz Present Variety: Q-sama!! in July 2006. During a two-hour special aired in September 2005, he broke the 115 meter Japan record previously set by Yasuda Dai Circus' Dancho Yasuda for DNF (dynamic apnea without fins) diving, establishing the Japan DNF record at the time at 116 metres (381 ft). Since then, he has appeared in this Q-sama!! feature several times.

Nokubo also made his first appearance on the quiz variety programme Quiz! Hexagon II on 29 November 2006. He later became a regular guest on the show in the summer of 2007, where he became well known as an 'obaka tarento', a celebrity known for their strange and often unintelligent comments. In that same period, Nokubo formed the band Shūchishin with fellow obaka tarento Takeshi Tsuruno and Yusuke Kamiji, and they made their CD debut with the release of their eponymous single 'Shūchishin' in April 2008. The single was a hit and his increasing popularity allowed him to expand to films. His personal career advanced with appearances on dramas while he also continued appearing on variety shows.

In January 2009, he appeared in Shūchishin's performance despite having left the band, however, he made significantly fewer appearances early that year due to controversy surrounding his relationship with Watanabe Entertainment that began in April 2009. On 26–27 July 2009, Shinsuke Shimada hosted the FNS no Hi 26-Jikan TV 2009: Chō Egao Parade Bakushō! Odaiba Gasshuku!! and announced at the end that Nokubo had taken a temporary break from the entertainment industry. Nokubo made no further public appearances and he effectively withdrew from Hexagon II.

On 1 April 2010, his profile and blog were deleted from Watanabe Entertainment's official website, making it clear he was no longer with the company. He made a return to acting with the stage play Kimazuge: Ai no kotoba. His appearance in the play was announced on Gekiden Taishū Shōsetsuka's official website a few days after his profile was removed from Watanabe Entertainment's website.

In June 2010, he joined the acting group Ai no Katamari (renamed ai-kata in 2011), formed from Gekiden Taishū Shōsetsuka. He also started a personal Twitter account and gave Breakpoint Inc. the responsibility of accepting his fan letters, as the business was a partner of the acting group. Nokubo was active in managing events and forming fan clubs in addition to his stage appearances for ai-kata.

Nokubo made a surprise performance at Hexagon Family Concert 2011 We Live Hexagon, the last live performance of Quiz! Hexagon II, held at Makuhari Messe on 26 November 2011. Shūchishin were also reunited for one day and their dissolution was announced at the same time.

In January 2012, Nokubo was treated as in the public sphere for the first time in three years at the production press conference for the stage play Legend of the Galactic Heroes Chapter II: Free Planetary Alliance, which was performed in April 2012. In September 2012, he appeared in Tokyo MX's Danshi-ing!!, his first television drama appearance for the first time in three and a half years.

== Personal life ==
Nokubo has played baseball since elementary school and has expressed a desire to play professionally in the future. While in junior high school, he played on the Hamamatsu Senior team of the Senior League along with Taketoshi Goto of the Yokohama DeNA BayStars where they won second place in the national competition. In his second year of junior high school, he hit a home-run while playing at Meiji Jingu Stadium.

He was also team captain when he was in his third year at Kinshin High School, and he was included on the draft candidates list of the Chunichi Dragons. He attended high school with Tomoyuki Oda (former Hokkaido Nippon-Ham Fighters' inside fielder) and Masaki Hayashi (former Hiroshima Toyo Carp pitcher), who were both his senior by two years.

Nokubo has stated multiple times in television interviews that he attended Júbilo Iwata games and that he was, in particular, a fan of Masashi Nakayama.

Nokubo has also spoken several times about his experience as a doorman at Prada as a temporary part-time job which he had before starting his acting career. He began his acting career by auditioning for several shows such as Ayumi Hamasaki's Live Dancer Audition and the Asayan Men's Vocalist Audition, which produced the band Chemistry. He also attended auditions for Bakuryu Sentai Abaranger and Mahou Sentai Magiranger.

=== Independence uproar ===
On 26 January 2009, Nokubo's blog on Watanabe Entertainment was suspended due to 'vandalism in the comment section'. The comment section was closed on 11 February, and the blog reopened. Afterwards, the blog was updated normally until its last update on 30 March 2009.

On 20 April 2009, Nokubo started a blog titled Full Count Never Give Up na Jinsei at Ameba Blog. The blog received nearly 6,000 comments immediately afterwards. The blog's first post hinted at Nobuko's separation from Watanabe Entertainment, and the news was posted online on 21 April by a large number of independent news organizations. The new blog was closed that day on 21 April and all news relating to Nokubo's independence was removed from the internet. Nokubo refused to comment further on the issue at the PR event for the film Burn After Reading, which was held that same day.

Afterwards, Watanabe entertainment issued a statement that their contract with Nokubo continued and reports of the actor's independence. In regards to the blog, they stated that Nokubo established the blog without contacting them first.

== Appearances ==
=== TV dramas ===
- Mother & Lover Episode 1 (Oct 2004, KTV)
- H2~Kimi toita Hibi (Jan–Mar 2005, TBS) – as Ozora Takeuchi
- Water Boys 2005 Natsu (19, 20 Aug 2005, CX) – as Hideyoshi
- Disney Drama Special Takayuki Ohira|Hoshi ni Negai o ~ Shichijō-kan de Umareta 410 Man no Hoshi (26 Aug 2005, CX)
- Aki no Renai Hisshō Drama Special Shōakumana Onna ni naru Hōhō (27 Sep 2005, KTV)
- Jyouou Episodes 2, 9, 12 (Oct–Dec 2005, TX)
- Yaoh (Jan–Mar 2006, TBS) – as Romeo host
- Regatta: Kimi Toita Eien (Jul–Sep 2006, EX) – as Naoki Kubo
- Kirakira Kenshūi Episode 2 (Jan 2007, TBS)
- Ai no Gekijō Sand Chronicles Episode 49 (May 2007, TBS)
- Joshi Ana Itchokusen Episodes 5, 7 (Jul–Sep 2007, TX) – as Hiroki
- 19th Yumeji (26 Aug 2007, TBS)
- Odaiba Tantei Shuchishin: Hexagon Satsujin Jiken (6 Aug 2008, CX) – as Naoki Nokubo (himself)
- Honto ni atta kowai Hanashi Natsu no Tokubetsu-hen 2008 "K-machi no Mansion" (26 Aug 2008, CX) – Starring; as Eiji Yagishita
- Panda ga Machi ni yattekuru (Nov–Dec 2008, MBS/TBS) – as Hitoshi Washio
- Shokora 3 "Marriage Blue no Onna: Fiancé ni wa Ienai Himitsu" (17 Dec 2008, NTV) – as Keita
- Tokumei Kakarichō Hitoshi Tadano 4th Season Episode 33 (8 Jan 2009, EX) – as Tsutomu Asano
- Nipponshi Suspense Gekijō Sengoku Ichi no Shitataka Onna Ohatsu Sengoku Survival Shosei-jutsu (28 Jan 2009, NTV) – as Kyōgoku Takatsugu
- Ketsuekigata Betsu Onna ga Kekkon suru Hōhō First Night (Episode 1): A-gata Onna ga Kekkon suru Hōhō (23 Feb 2009, CX) – as Makoto Watanabe
- Shokora 4 "Sōshoku Danshi o Oto su Nikushoku Joshi no Himitsu" (1 Apr 2009, NTV) – as Kenta Hotta
- Danshi-ing!! Episodes 1, 2 (Sep–Oct 2012, Tokyo MX) – as Shingo
- Ōoka Echizen 2 Episode 8 (21 Nov 2014, NHK BS Premium) – as Miyano Nobushiro
- Bushi no Tamashī Episode 11 (5 Sep 2017, BS Japan) – as Naotsune Tajimamori (Matsudaira)

=== Films ===
- Arakure Knight (2007) – as Benioto Maki
- Twilight Syndrome Dead Cruise (2008) – as Goro

=== Direct-to-video ===
- Arakure Knight: Gekitō-hen (2007)

=== Stage ===
- Please Me (Aug 2005, Omotesando Fab) Guest appearance as a member of "Members Only"
- limit: Anata no Monogatari wa Nanidesu ka? (Jun 2006, Theatre V Akasaka) – as Makiron
- Nasugamama (Feb 2007, Shinjuku Tiny Alice)
- Hexa na Futari (Feb 2008, Theatre Apple) – as Nonokubo*Double starring with Takeshi Tsuruno
- K (Feb–Mar 2009, Akasaka ACT Theater, Shin Kobe Oriental Theatre) – as Sho Uehara*Starring
- Kisumage: Ai no Kotoba (Apr–May 2010, Tokyo Metropolitan Theatre) – as Seigi Mikata
- More than this -Ai no Katamari- (Jun 2010, Mill's Theatre)
- Ai no Katamari -summer- (Jul 2010, Mill's Theatre)
- Oh My Ghost!! (Aug 2010, Nakano The Pocket) cameo*(voice)
- Setsunage -Ai no Kakera- (Oct 2010, Makoto Theatre Ginza) – as Akihiro Kanda*Starring
- Orinaka (Feb 2011, Mill's Theatre)
- Nine Blood (May 2011, Owl Spot) – as Rahito Take*Starring
- Endless (Jul 2011, Mill's Theatre)*Starring
- Fly to The Moon! (Oct 2011, Mill's Theatre)*Starring
- Boobies (Dec 2011, Makoto Theatre Ginza)
- Who Is Sundayman (Feb 2012, Mill's Theatre)
- Legend of the Galactic Heroes Chapter II: Free Planetary Alliance (Apr 2012, Tokyo International Forum/NHK Osaka Hall) – as Rap
- Gosenshi no Ue no Jane (Jun 2012, Owl Spot) – as Kazuma*Double starring with Fuyuki Moto
- (Kabu) Dream Show ~Ryaku shite Dorishō~ (Aug 2012, Mill's Theatre)*Starring
- Cash Mob (Oct 2012, Mill's Theatre)*Starring
- Rental Kanojo (Nov–Dec 2012, Nakano The Pocket) cameo – as Ishibashi
- Rhythmic Town (Dec 2012, Theatre Sunmall) – as Hans
- Oh!-Room! (Dec 2012, Mill's Theatre) guest
- Atono Matsuri (Mar 2013, Theatre Sunmall) – as Sakuragi Sora
- Messenger Blues -Tsukai Pashiri, Asu ni Mukatte Hashire- (May 2013, Mill's Theatre)*Starring
- Samurai Banka III (Jun–Jul 2013, Kinokuniya Hall, etc.) – as Kenkichi
- Zipang Pirates (Aug 2013, Owl Spot) – as Furuya
- Kimisari: Kimi Sarishi nochi 2013 (Sep 2013, Akasaka Red Theatre)
- Recitation drama Natsukage Sayonara o Suru Tame ni... (Oct 2013, Mill's Theatre)*Starring
- Yohakuna Bokura (Nov 2013, Total Clearance Hall Space Zero) guest
- Gung (Nov–Dec 2013, Mill's Theatre)
- Mother: Tokkō no Haha Tori Hama Tome Monogatari (Dec 2013 – Mar 2014, New National Theatre, Tokyo Small Theatre, etc.) – as Shoi Kanayama
- Dōsōkai o hirakou (Feb 2014, Mill's Theatre)
- Nanushi Hata Rīsa to Izanagi-kun (May 2014, Mill's Theatre) – as Izanagi-kun
- Nemurenu Yoru no Honky Tonk Blues Dainishō: Fukkatsu (May–Jun 2014, Kinokuniya Southern Theatre, etc.) – as Taiyo
- Takara ya Ryokan Kensenja! 2014ver. (Jul–Aug 2014, Mill's Theatre) – as Shinnosuke Kirishima
- Lazy Midnight (15 Nov – Dec 2014, 4 locations nationwide)
- Hanare Start!: Oh-Room!2 (Dec 2014, Mill's Theatre) – guest
- Meisagatei Kominami Jiken-bo -Nagai Tomo to no Hajimari ni (Jan 2015, Mill's Theatre)
- Zipang Pirates (Feb 2015, Owl Spot) – as Zangi
- Ashita no Omohide (Feb 2015, Shinjuku Village Live) guest
- La festa -Jinsei no Recipe- (Mar 2015, Buddhist Hall)
- Nemurenu Yoru no Honky Tonk Blues Dainishō: Hiyaku (May–Jun 2015, Kinokuniya Hall, etc.) – as Taiyo
- Meisagatei Kominami Jiken-bo Part2 (Jul 2015, Mill's Theatre)
- Tengantoppa Guren Ragan: Enuhen Sono San (Sep 2015, Theatre 1010) – as Anti-Spiral
- Rental Kanojo (Oct–Nov 2015, Sasazuka Factory)
- Kusaba no Kage de Neta o Kaku. (Feb 2016, Owl Spot)
- Cherry Boys (Apr 2016, Museum Shinkansen Theatre)
- Meisagatei Kominami Jiken-bo Part3 -Hawaii kara Kita Onna (May 2016, Mill's Theatre)
- Musical Bad Daughter (Jun 2016, Owl Spot) – as Leonhart
- Haken Do!!: Haken Sengoku Kōkō Tengafubu (Jul 2016, Shinjuku Village Live) – as Tachibana
- Darekaga Kanojo o shitte iru (Aug 2016, Theatre Bonbon) – as Yamato Kase
- LDK Medium (Nov 2016, Wasal Theatre) – as Master
- What A Wonderful Life!: Takufesu Tokubetsu Kōen (Dec 2016, Tokyo Globe Theatre) – as Kurosu
- Takara ya Ryokan Kensenja! 2017 (Feb 2017, Mill's Theatre)
- Sagimusume Jinsei Haretari Kumottari (Jul 2017, Mill's Theatre) – as Shotaro Matsunami
- Meisagatei Kominami Jiken-bo Part4 -Shikake Hanabi no Onna (Aug 2017, Mill's Theatre) – as Matsu

=== Other TV programmes ===
- Ongaku Senshi Music Fighter (Oct 2005 – Mar 2006, NTV) Regular appearances in "Aoki Senzoku Ikemen Assistant"
- Hirame-kin Gold (Oct 2005 – Feb 2006, NTV) Appeared as a member of the D-League's "Watanabe Out of Orders"
- Quiz! Hexagon II (29 Nov 2006 – 28 Sep 2011, CX)
  - 5 August 2009 broadcast of the programme was absent
  - In the broadcast on 26 March 2008, he strikes a wonderful record of himself the highest points (28 points earned)
- The Best House 123 (Oct 2007 – Jun 2009, CX)
- Kujira no Oyako ni deatta! Tahiti Rurutu-shima Ao no Rakuen no Monogatari (24 Nov 2007, BS Japan) navigator
- Ojisans 11 (Apr–Sep 2008, NTV)
- Perfume no Ki ni naru Kochan (Oct 2008 – Mar 2009, NTV)
- Minna no Kōshien (Mar 2009, MBS) navigator
- Noku.ch Oishīmono Paradise (Apr–Jul 2012, Mall Of TV)

=== Internet ===
- Noku Chaaaaaaan!! (Nov 2010 – 2011, Ustream) occasionally in webcast

== Publications ==
=== Books ===
- Naoki Nokubo Shashin-shū -Naoki Nokubo- (2012, SansaiBooks)
- Natural Mind (2012, SansaiBooks) – Photo Essay Collection

== Group Work ==
- Members Only
  - A group started in 2005 consisting of Ryoji Ando, fellow Watanabe Entertainment actor Shun Mitamura, and D-Boys' Masato Wada, and Nokubo. The group was started from a special show on Watanabe Entertainments mobile website. Members would make guest appearances on Watanabe Entertainment's live shows, publish diaries and web content, among other activities. The group came to an end in 2006 when some of the members left Watanabe Entertainment.
- Quiz! Hexagon II related
  - Shūchishin
  - Aladdin
  - Air Band feat.Yu&Nao
- ai-kata
  Nokubo joined the acting group Gekidan Taishū Shōsetsuka in June 2010. The group's name was changed in August 2011 from Ai no Katamari.
