= Kinako (film) =

- Film poster
- Directed by: Yoshinori Kobayashi
- Written by: Hideya Hamada; Kito Tawara
- Produced by: Ito Jingo; Kazunari Takeuchi; Yoshitaka Ishizuka; Kiichi Iguchi
- Starring: Kaho; Yasufumi Terawaki; Naho Toda
- Cinematography: Takahito Kasai
- Edited by: Hirohide Abe
- Music by: Takayuki Hattori (score); Metis (songs)
- Production company: Dentsu
- Distributed by: Shochiku
- Release date: 14 July 2010 (Japan)
- Running time: 113 minutes
- Country: Japan
- Language: Japanese

Kinako - The Story of an Apprentice Police Dog (Japanese: きな子〜見習い警察犬の物語〜, Hepburn: Kinako: Minarai Keisatsuken no Monogatari) is a 2010 Japanese film based on a true story of a dog trainer. It was released in cinemas throughout Japan on 14 July 2010.

== Story ==
This movie is based on the true story of a female dog trainer, Kyoko Mochizuki, nicknamed "Anko", and a Labrador Retriever which repeatedly fails the police dog trials despite numerous tries. Kyoko Mochizuki is an 18-year-old girl who dreams of becoming a police dog trainer. She is admitted to a police dog training school and meets a young Kinako, a Labrador Retriever puppy. An instructor there informs Kyoko that Kinako is too weak to become a police dog, but Kyoko is determined that she will make Kinako into one.

== Cast ==
- Kaho as Kyoko Mochizuki
- Yasufumi Terawaki as Seijiro Banba
- Naho Toda as Utako Banba
- Yusuke Yamamoto as Wataru Tashiro
- Kenichi Endō as Ryoichi Mochizuki
- Miyoko Asada as Sonoko Mochizuki
- Mitsuru Hirata as Takashi Sakuraba
- Ryohei Hirota as Keita Banba
- Momoka Ono as Niina Banba

== Production ==
=== Theme song ===
The film's theme song was provided by the singer Metis. The theme song is a newly written piece of music, and is entitled Only One: Aitakute (Only One～逢いたくて～).

== Media ==
=== DVD ===
The DVD version was released on 14 January 2011.

=== Photo book ===
A photobook by Kaho, entitled “Breeze with Kinako”, was on 4 August 2010. The photos were taken at the filming location this movie.

== Reception ==
=== Critical reception ===
Mark Schilling from The Japan Times, criticized the film for using "cliche after cornball cliche from local 'guts-to-glory' films, while inflicting shot after shamelessly adorable shot of its title pooch and teen trainer" and gave the film a rating of 1.5 out of 5. He also derided the film's actress Kaho, whom he described as "a bit old to pull [her role] off". The reviewer also added that "the best actor in the film is the dog" and advised viewers who are looking for "stress relief with funny animal tricks" to "save time and try YouTube".

=== Accolades ===
Film festival	Date of ceremony	Category	Participants/Recipients	Result
34th Japan Academy Prize	18 February 2011	Best Newcomer	Momoka Ono	Won
