= Tsuruno =

Tsuruno (written: つるの, 靏野 or 鶴野) is a Japanese surname. Notable people with the surname include:

- Taiki Tsuruno (鶴野 太貴, born 1990), Japanese footballer
- Takeshi Tsuruno (つるの 剛士, born 1975), Japanese actor, television personality and musician
