= Yusuke Kamiji =

Japanese actor, singer, and tarento (born 1979)

- Born: April 18, 1979 (age 47); Yokosuka, Kanagawa Prefecture, Japan
- Occupations: Actor, tarento, singer, singer-songwriter
- Years active: 1999–present
- Website: www.yuusuke.jp

Yusuke
- Genre: J-pop
- Instrument: Guitar
- Years active: 2009–present
- Label: Sony Music Records
- Formerly of: Shuchishin
- Website: www.sonymusic.co.jp/Music/Arch/SR/yusuke/

Yusuke Kamiji (上地 雄輔, Kamiji Yūsuke; born April 18, 1979 in Yokosuka, Kanagawa Prefecture, Japan as the first born) is a Japanese actor, singer, and tarento. In the music world, he is known simply as Yusuke (遊助, Yūsuke).

== Biography ==
Kamiji graduated from Yokohama Senior High School. He belonged to the baseball club while in school, and played catcher. He and Daisuke Matsuzaka played together for one year, and when Matsuzaka joined the club, it was Kamiji who first practiced with him. Kamiji assumed uniform number 2 from autumn of his junior year, but handed it over to freshman Yoshio Koyama (currently with the Chunichi Dragons) because of a serious injury to his right elbow during practice.

After high school, Kamiji attempted to enter university on a sports scholarship, but gave it up after the injury to his elbow. He then decided to make his way as an actor. He made his debut in the serial drama "LXIXVXE" on TBS in 1999. By this time, Daisuke Matsuzaka had made world headlines in the pros, and it was reported in several Japanese sports journals that his "former wife" had debuted as an actor. Kamiji acquired experience be appearing in bit parts in many TV dramas and movies.

His big break was in a guest appearance on "Quiz Hexagon II", a Japanese celebrity game show, in which he continues to provide comic relief; he is also a regular guest on Fuji TV's Stupid Cara.

Along with two of his fellow regulars on Quiz! Hexagon II, Takeshi Tsuruno and Naoki Nokubo, Kamiji was a member of a musical unit called Shuchishin. The trio often performed on air on Hexagon II for roughly one year, after which the group was dissolved. Since then, Kamiji has recorded and released music under the simply Yusuke (遊助, Yūsuke; written differently from his legal name). All three of his singles released in 2009 charted, with "Himawari" reaching No. 8 for the year, "Tanpopo/Kaizokusen/Sono Kobushi" at No. 17, and "Ichō" at No. 37.

In 2008, Kamiji's blog was officially recognized by the Guinness Book of World Records for the most unique visitors to the page in a 24-hour period.

Kamiji's father, Katsuaki Kamiji, is Yokosuka City Congressman.

Kamiji was married to an unnamed woman in 2015. On January 7, 2017, his wife gave birth to a son.

== Filmography ==
=== Television ===
- Tenchijin (2009), Kobayakawa Hideaki
- Galápagos (2023)
- Dear Radiance (2024), Fujiwara no Michitsuna
- Water Margin (2026), Song Qing

=== Film ===
- The Floating Castle (2012), Ishida Mitsunari
- Samurai Hustle (2014)
- Samurai Hustle Returns (2016)
- Let Me Eat Your Pancreas (2017)
- One Last Throw (2025), Akihiro Tsuchiya
- Samurai Hustle: Full Throttle (2027)

=== Japanese dub ===
- The Mummy: Tomb of the Dragon Emperor (2008), Alexander Rupert "Alex" O'Connell (Luke Ford)
