= Shuchishin =

Japanese musical group (2008–2009)

Shuchishin 羞恥心
- Origin: Japan
- Genre: J-pop
- Years active: 2008–2009
- Label: Pony Canyon
- Past members: Takeshi "Shu" Tsuruno; Naoki "Chi" Nokubo; Yusuke "Shin" Kamiji

Shuchishin (羞恥心, Shūchishin) was a Japanese idol vocal group formed as part of the variety show Quiz! Hexagon II produced by Fuji Television Network Incorporated. Originally meant to be a joke group, the trio has released singles that have hit the top 10 on both the Oricon and the Billboard Japan Hot 100 Singles. Shuchishin, whose name translates as "Shame", consists of the leader Takeshi Tsuruno with Naoki Nokubo and Yusuke Kamiji. The group's final performance was on the January 2, 2009, New Year's Special episode of Quiz! Hexagon II. The group's name comes from a mispronunciation of the word when it came up in a question on the show in mid-2007 (the word "shūchishin" was pronounced as "sajishin" (さじしん) by the members of the band).

The group was disbanded in January 2009. Since then, Takeshi Tsuruno and Yusuke Kamiji have pursued solo musical careers, while Naoki Nokubo has returned to drama acting. Tsuruno has released two cover albums and released a single with another Hexagon Family vocal group, and Kamiji recording under the name "Yusuke" (written with different kanji than his legal name) has released three singles through the Sony Music Records label. The group also reunited to record a song with all of the Hexagon Family artists.

== Members ==
Shu (羞, Shū; ■)
Takeshi Tsuruno (つるの 剛士, Tsuruno Takeshi), represented by Ohta Production, is the leader of the group. He is known best in Japan for his lead role in the 1997-98 Ultra Series' Ultraman Dyna as Shin Asuka/Ultraman Dyna, a role he reprised in the 2008 film Superior Ultraman 8 Brothers. Quoting Oda Nobunaga, his catchphrase is "If the cuckoo does not sing, kill it, I am 'Shu'" (鳴かぬなら殺してしまえホトトギス、『羞』です, Nakanunara koroshiteshimae hototogisu, "Shū" desu). The color he is associated with is red.
Chi (恥; ■)
Naoki Nokubo (野久保 直樹, Nokubo Naoki), represented by Watanabe Entertainment, is best in Japan for his roles in the drama Panda is Coming to Town (パンダが町にやってくる, Panda ga Machi ni Yattekuru) and the film Twilight Syndrome: Dead Cruise (トワイライトシンドローム デッドクルーズ, Towairaito Shindorōmu Deddo Kurūzu). Quoting Tokugawa Ieyasu, his catchphrase is "If the cuckoo does not sing, wait for it, I am 'Chi'" (鳴かぬなら鳴くまで待とうホトトギス、『恥』です, Nakanunara nakumadematō hototogisu, "Chi" desu). The color he is associated with is blue.
Shin (心; ■)
Yusuke Kamiji (上地 雄輔, Kamiji Yūsuke), represented by Japan Music Entertainment, is known in Japan having trained with Boston Red Sox starting pitcher Daisuke Matsuzaka while they were in Yokohama Senior High School's baseball club before Kamiji had to quit due to a shoulder injury. He also holds a Guinness World Record for having the World's Most Visited Blog, having 230,755 unique visitors and 13,171,039 page views in one day. Quoting Toyotomi Hideyoshi, his catchphrase is "If the cuckoo does not sing, coax it, I am 'Shin'" (鳴かぬなら鳴かせて見せようホトトギス、『心』です, Nakanunara nakashitemiseyō hototogisu, "Shin" desu). The color he is associated with is yellow.

== Discography ==
=== Singles ===
==== As "Shuchishin" ====
Shuchishin's self-titled debut single became the fifth top selling song for 2008 on the Oricon Charts and the tenth on the Billboard Japan Year-End Hot 100.

1. "Shuchishin" (羞恥心, Shūchishin; translated as "Shame") - April 9, 2008
  - The group's debut single only peaked at #2 on the Oricon's Weekly Charts from April 21 to May 12, 2008, but hit #1 on the Billboard Japan Hot 100, the Planet charts, the Sound Scan Japan charts, and the Music Station singles chart. It was the top selling single for the month of April 2008 on the Oricon's monthly charts, dropping to #3 in May, and was at #4 for the first half of the year, and #5 for 2008 on the Oricon's yearly charts. It reached #10 on the Billboard Japan Year-End Hot 100. The Recording Industry Association of Japan certified it as a Platinum record and a Triple Platinum truetone ringtone. The song subsequently became the most requested song in karaoke parlors in Japan, followed by Yazima Beauty Salon's "Nihon no Mikata -Nevada Kara Kimashita-" and GReeeeN's "Kiseki". The song was subsequently covered in English by Andrew W.K. for truetone ringtones in Japan with GReeeeN's "Kiseki", THE BLUE HEARTS' "Linda Linda", and Finger 5's "Gakuen Tengoku". These were then all included on his album The Japan Covers.
2. "Nakanai de" (泣かないで; translated as "Don't Cry") - June 25, 2008
  - The group's second single peaked at #2 on the Oricon's Weekly Charts and the Billboard Japan Hot 100, #2 for the month of July on the Oricon's Monthly Charts, and #16 on the Oricon's Yearly Charts. The RIAJ certified it as a Platinum record and a Double Platinum ringtone.
3. "Yowamushi Santa" (弱虫サンタ; translated as "Cowardly Santa") - December 10, 2008
  - This Christmas song is the group's only #1 single on the Oricon's Weekly Charts, reaching #1 on December 22, 2008. The song is coupled with "Nanimokamo ga Kimi Datta" (何もかもが君だった; translated as "You Were Everything to Me"), a solo by Tsuruno performing as Shu (羞-Shu-, Shū).

==== As "Aladdin" ====
1. Hi wa, Mata Noboru (陽は、また昇る; translated as "The Sun, Also Rises") - July 30, 2008
  - This single was a collaboration with Pabo (whose name comes from the Korean word "pabo" 바보 translated as "fool"), a female trio consisting of Mai Satoda, Suzanne, and Yukina Kinoshita, who are also involved with Quiz! Hexagon II, under the name Aladdin (アラジン, Arajin; dubbed "Aladdin the second" to differentiate with composer Kei Tahahara's original band). The song peaked at #2 on the Oricon Weekly Charts and the Hot 100, becoming the #3 selling single for the month of August 2008 and the #20 song of 2008 on the Oricon's charts. The RIAJ also certified "Hi wa, Mata Noboru" as a Platinum record.

=== Albums ===
- We Love Hexagon (WE LOVE ♥ ヘキサゴン, Wī Ravu Hekisagon) - October 22, 2008
  - We Love Hexagon is a compilation album of the various groups involved with Quiz! Hexagon II and "Shuchishin", "Nakanai de", and "Hi wa, Mata Noboru" are all included. Shuchishin also recorded a cover of RYOEI's "Waga Teki wa Ware ni Ari" (我が敵は我にあり; translated as "Our Enemy is With Us") and a cover of Shin Kōda's "Minami no Shima ~Tomo e~" (南の島〜友へ〜; translated as "Southern Island ~To Friends~") as a secret track for the album. The album charted at #1 on November 3, 2008, on the Oricon's Weekly Charts, #1 for the month of November on its Monthly Charts, and #24 for the year on the Yearly Charts. It was also certified as a Platinum Album in October and then Double Platinum in November. The group also performed on the album as AIR BAND feat. Yu & Nao (AIR BAND feat.雄&直, AIR BAND feat. Yū & Nao) on a cover of AIR BAND's "Aburazemi♂ (Tokyo Version)" (アブラゼミ♂（東京バージョン）, Aburazemi Osu (Tōkyō Bājon)) and Tsuruno with Pabo's Mai Satoda performed as mai & takeshi (mai&タケシ) on a cover of misono & hiroshi's "Aburazemi♀ (Osaka Version)" (アブラゼミ♀（大阪バージョン）, Aburazemi Mesu (Ōsaka Bājon)).
- We Love Hexagon 2009 (WE LOVE ♥ ヘキサゴン 2009, Wī Ravu Hekisagon 2009) - October 21, 2009
  - We Love Hexagon 2009 is the follow-up to We Love Hexagon consisting of tracks released over the 2009 season on Quiz! Hexagon II. Shuchishin's "Yowamushi Santa" was included as part of the album. Takeshi Tsuruno also became a part of the group Friends with Hiromi Sakimoto, and their song "Naite mo Ii Desu ka" (泣いてもいいですか; "Can I Cry?") was included on the album. "Naite mo Ii Desu ka" was also recorded by the entire Hexagon Family (including Tsuruno, Kamiji, and Nokubo) as the Hexagon All-Stars (ヘキサゴンオールスターズ, Hekisagon Ōru Sutāzu), and a version performed live with the show's audience was included on the album. The 2009 album peaked at #2 on the Oricon Weekly Album Charts.
- We Love Hexagon 2010 (WE LOVE ♥ ヘキサゴン 2010, Wī Ravu Hekisagon 2010) - November 17, 2010
  - We Love Hexagon 2010 is the follow up to the 2009 edition. A remix of "Shuchishin" called the "Shame Remix 2010" is included on a limited edition bonus disk. Tsuruno is also featured on the album as a member of Friends and Tsubasa singing "Dear Friends -Tomo e-" and "Bokura ni wa Tsubasa ga Aru ~Mata Aou~".

== Parody ==
Shuchishin and their debut single's popularity also spawned the parodic group Hisokan (悲愴感, Hisōkan; whose name translates as "Patheticness") consisting of owarai comedians Hiroshi Yamamoto of Robert (Hi (悲) represented by moss green (苔色, kokeiro; ■)), Takushi Tanaka of Ungirls (So (愴, Sō) represented by lacquered dark red (潤朱, urumishu; ■)), and Taku Suzuki of Drunk Dragon (Kan (感) represented by lead gray (藍鼠, ainezumi; ■)). Hisokan released their own self-titled single on August 27, 2008, which peaked at #5 on the Oricon's Weekly Charts on September 8, 2008.

== Gold Disc Awards ==
For the 23rd Japan Gold Disc Award, Shuchishin won "New Artist of the Year", was included as one of "The Best 10 New Artists" twice (once as Aladdin and once as Shuchishin), and We Love Hexagon won "Project Album of the Year".
