= Tsuyoshi Ihara =

Japanese actor (b. 1963)

- 伊原 剛志
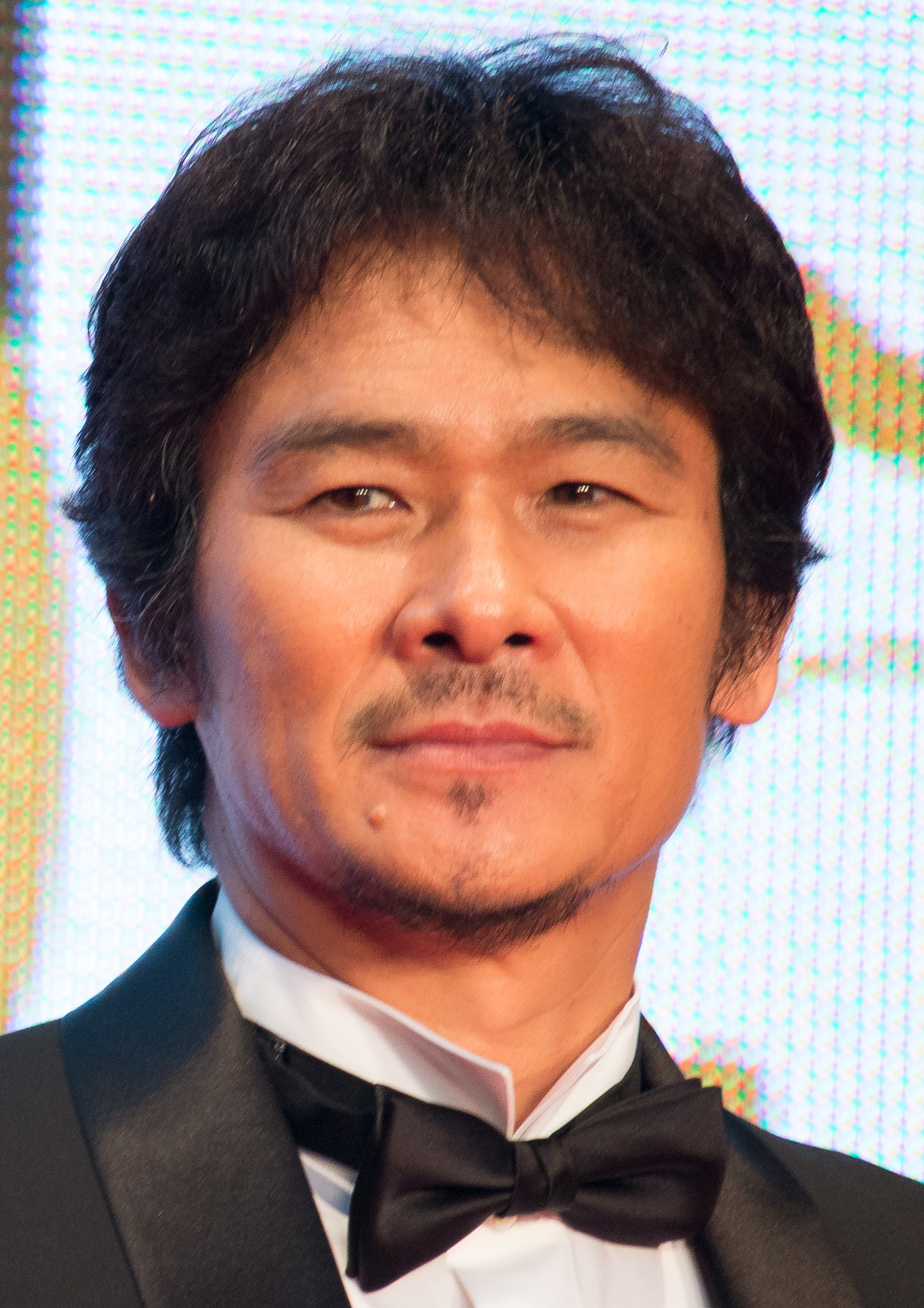
- Ihara in 2015
- Born: Yun Yu-gu; November 6, 1963 (age 62); Kitakyushu, Fukuoka, Japan
- Citizenship: Japan (since 1995)
- Occupation: Actor
- Years active: 1982–present

Japanese name
- Kanji: 伊原 剛志
- Hiragana: いはら つよし
- Katakana: イハラ ツヨシ
Transcriptions
- Romanization: Ihara Tsuyoshi

Korean name
- Hangul: 윤유구
- Hanja: 尹惟裕
- RR: Yun Yugu
- MR: Yun Yugu

Tsuyoshi Ihara (伊原 剛志, Ihara Tsuyoshi; born Yun Yu-gu, Korean: 윤유구; November 6, 1963) is a Japanese actor of Korean descent.

== Early life ==
Ihara, a third-generation Zainichi Korean by birth, was born on November 6, 1963, in Kitakyūshū as Yun Yu-gu (윤유구; 尹惟久) and grew up in Ikuno-ku "Korea Town" section of Osaka. He is a graduate of Imamiya Senior High School, Naniwa-ku, Osaka. He received his Japanese citizenship in 1995.

== Career ==
Ihara joined Sonny Chiba's Japan Action Club after leaving high school. Soon after, he began to work in numerous feature films and television dramas, including the 1996 NHK series Futarikko. In 2006, Ihara appeared as the Baron Takeichi Nishi in Clint Eastwood's critically acclaimed Academy Award-winning film Letters from Iwo Jima, introducing him to a wider international audience.

Ihara authored a book, Kokorozashite Sōrō (志して候う), published in Japan by Amoeba Books.

In 2016, he became an apprentice to Katsura. He made his debut as a rakugo artist.

== Filmography ==
=== Films ===
- Bakayaro! I'm Plenty Mad (1988), Kazuki Numayama
- Jingi (1991), Jin Kanbayashi
- Gamera: Guardian of the Universe (1995), Yoshinari Yonemori
- Letters from Iwo Jima (2006), Baron Takeichi Nishi
- Thirteen Assassins (2010), Hirayama Kujuro
- Samurai Hustle (2014), Kumogakure Danzo
- Samurai Hustle Returns (2016), Kumogakure Danzo
- La Campanella (2025)
- Samurai Hustle: Full Throttle (2027), Kumogakure Danzo

=== Television dramas ===
- Takeda Shingen (1988), Oda Nobuyuki
- Only You (1996)
- Futarikko (1996), Masao kuroiwa
- When the Last Sword Is Drawn (2002), Hijikata Toshizō
- Shinsengumi! (2004), Sasaki Tadasaburō
- Hanako and Anne (2014), Kippei Ando
- Burning Flower (2015), Sakamoto Ryōma
- The Naked Director Season 2 (2021)

=== Books ===
- Kokorozashite Sōrō (author)
