= Yukina Kinoshita =

Former Japanese model and television personality (born 1987)

- 木下 優樹菜
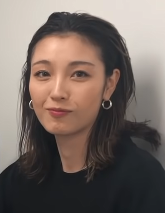
- Kinoshita in 2019
- Born: August 4, 1987 (age 39); Katsushika, Tokyo, Japan
- Other name: Yukina Fuijimoto
- Education: Shibuya Liberal High School
- Occupations: Model; tarento
- Years active: 2006–2019
- Spouse: Toshifumi Fujimoto (m. 2010; div. 2019)
- Children: 2

Yukina Fujimoto (藤本 優樹菜, Fujimoto Yukina; born August 4, 1987), known by her maiden name Yukina Kinoshita (木下 優樹菜, Kinoshita Yukina), is a Japanese model and television personality. She was a member of the musical group Pabo alongside Mai Satoda and Suzanne, all three of whom were later grouped with Shuchishin as members of Aladdin.

== Career ==
Kinoshita was born in Katsushika, Tokyo, and attended Shibuya Liberal High School. She began modelling at the age of 19, when she got her first assignment as a lingerie model in the 2007 edition of Sanai swimsuit image girl. Later in 2008, she landed another assignment as an image girl for the company Kygnus Sekiyu. She also did gravure modelling and released two photobooks, with the first being "Yukina" 2007 and the second "Wakannai" in 2008, as well as two DVDs. She became famous primarily as a television personality, appearing first on the quiz show Quiz! Hexagon II, where she became known as a o-baka tarento (dumb celebrity). It was during this time that she became a part of the bands Pabo and Aladdin the Second. She has appeared in commercials for popular brands such as Pizza Hut, Kirin Brewery Company, and GREE, as well as in Japanese fashion magazines such as Pinky and Vivi. In 2007 she was a regular on Pokémon Sunday.

=== Retirement and Return ===
Kinoshita announced her retirement from the entertainment industry in February 2020, but resumed entertainment and work related activities at the start of July. On July 6, 2020, it was announced that she had fully retired from the entertainment industry as a result of a disagreement with her agency. On September 1 of the same year, Kinoshita made an unannounced return to the public sphere with the launch of a new Instagram profile.

== Personal life ==
On August 28, 2010, she married the Japanese comedian Toshifumi Fujimoto, member of comedy duo Fujiwara, with whom she co-starred on Quiz! Hexagon II. On August 6, 2012, Kinoshita gave birth to their first daughter. On November 3, 2015, she gave birth to their second daughter. In November 2019, Kinoshita was embroiled in scandal after confronting a Tokyo tapioca milk tea shop over a failure to pay a younger sister who was working at the shop at the time. Kinoshita was said to have threatened the business using her influence in the entertainment industry, an action criticized by some on the internet as a form of "bullying". As a result of this incident, Kinoshita temporarily suspended her activities in the entertainment industry. Kinoshita and Fujimori announced their divorce on December 31, 2019, with suspicions of infidelity coming to light shortly after. In 2016, she and Naoto, a member of the boy band EXILE, were cast in a popular television segment which reportedly led to an intimate relationship between the two that continued until July 2020. In the segment, the two would interview married men drinking late at night about their relationships with their wives. On numerous reported occasions, Kinoshita and Naoto would frequent bars and stay overnight at love hotels after the end of filming. Suspicions of the pair had risen long before as they often post intimate photos with each other on Instagram while stating that they were "just friends." Additionally, Kinoshita had several reported affairs with unnamed talents in 2019 including Japanese national soccer team player Takashi Inui.

=== ADHD Diagnosis ===
Kinoshita announced her diagnosis with ADHD (Attention-deficit/hyperactivity disorder) in July 2022.

== Filmography ==
=== Movies ===
Year	Title	Role	Notes
2008	20th Century Boys-The Movie	A girl in Shibuya	Cameo
2011	Mistaken	Cameo	Unknown
2017	Eiga Kamisama Minarai: Himitsu no Cocotama	Hapipina	Voice role

=== Television ===
Year	Title	Role	Network	Notes
2008	Hachi-One Diver	Tsukishima Misaki	Fuji TV	Supporting Role-1 Episode
2008	Osen	Kaori	Nippon TV	Supporting Role-1 Episode
2008	Odaiba Tantei Suchishin Hexagon Satsujin Jiken	Unknown	Fuji TV	Cameo
2008	Honto ni atta Kowai Hanashi	Chakushin Rireki	Fuji TV	Supporting Role-1 Episode
2009	Mr. Brain	Cleaning Lady	TBS	Supporting Role-1 Episode
2009	Kochikame	Local Delinquent	TBS	Guest Role-1 Episode
2011	Kounodori: Dr. Stork	Aoki Tomoko	TBS	Guest Role-1 Episode

== Music ==
=== Discography ===
Year	Song	Notes
2007	Pokemon	A song to promote the 2007 season of the Japanese version of Pokémon Diamond and Pearl
