= Yasufumi Terawaki =

Japanese actor

- Born: February 25, 1962 (age 64); Sakai, Osaka, Japan
- Occupation: Actor
- Years active: 1984–present
- Agent: Amuse, Inc.

Yasufumi Terawaki (寺脇康文, Terawaki Yasufumi) is a Japanese actor. He was nominated for Best Supporting Actor at the 32nd Japan Academy Prize for Aibō The Movie.

== Selected filmography ==
=== Film ===
- Mangetsu no Kuchizuke (1989)
- Kinako (2011)
- Samurai Hustle (2014)
- My Love Story!! (2015)
- The Magnificent Nine (2016)
- Samurai Hustle Returns (2016)
- Recall (2018)
- My Dad is a Heel Wrestler (2018)
- The 47 Ronin in Debt (2019)
- Extro (2020), Himself
- Blue Heaven wo Kimi ni (2020)
- Food Luck (2020)
- Go Away, Moebius!! (2023)
- Hold Your Hand (2023)
- Samurai Hustle: Full Throttle (2027)

=== Television ===
- AIBOU: Tokyo Detective Duo (2000–2022, season 1–7, and 21), Kaoru Kameyama
- Sunshine (2011)
- Ru: Taiwan Express (2020)
- North Light (2020)
- Ranman (2023), Rankō Ikeda

=== Theatre ===
- My Fair Lady - Professor Henry Higgins (2013–2018)
