= Samurai Hustle =

- Poster
- Directed by: Katsuhide Motoki
- Written by: Akihiro Dobashi
- Produced by: Takashi Yajima
- Starring: Kuranosuke Sasaki; Kyoko Fukada; Tsuyoshi Ihara; Yasufumi Terawaki; Yusuke Kamiji
- Cinematography: Shōji Ehara
- Edited by: Isao Kawase
- Music by: Yoshikazu Suo
- Distributed by: Shochiku
- Release date: 21 June 2014 (Japan)
- Running time: 119 minutes
- Country: Japan
- Language: Japanese
- Box office: ¥1.55 billion (Japan)

Samurai Hustle (lit. Mission Impossible: Samurai) (Japanese: 超高速!参勤交代, Hepburn: Chōkōsoku! Sankin Kōtai) is a 2014 Japanese jidaigeki comedy film directed by Katsuhide Motoki and starring Kuranosuke Sasaki, Kyoko Fukada and Tsuyoshi Ihara. It was released on 21 June 2014.

It featured in the Japanese Film Festival in Australia in 2014 under the name Samurai Hustle. The film made its Los Angeles premiere at LA Eigafest 2014.

It was followed by 2016's Samurai Hustle Returns.

== Cast ==
- Kuranosuke Sasaki
- Kyoko Fukada
- Tsuyoshi Ihara
- Yasufumi Terawaki
- Yusuke Kamiji
- Yuri Chinen
- Seiji Rokkaku as Imamura
- Tokio Emoto
- Takanori Jinnai
- Masahiko Nishimura

== Reception ==
The film initially grossed ¥900 million in Japan. Its final box office tally was ¥1.55 billion yen.
