= Yoku Hata =

Japanese comedian

Yōku Hata (波田陽区, Hata Yōku, real name: Akira Hada (波田 晃, Hada Akira), born June 5, 1975, in Shimonoseki, Yamaguchi Prefecture) is a Japanese stand up comedian.

== Career ==
Hata rose to popularity in 2004 with his character "The Guitar Zamurai (Samurai)" (ギター侍) on the program The God of Entertainment (エンタの神様). Dressed in a yukata, his skit always follows the same form. He makes a supposed quote about someone famous, and then mocks the quote (and the person) and says "残念!" (zannen!, Too Bad!) Then he imitates the person and finishes that section with a "切り" (giri!, Slash!) as he makes a sword slash movement with his guitar. At the end of a set, he usually says some self-deprecating remark and ends yelling "切腹!" (seppuku!). His popularity in this persona earned him an animated cameo in the Crayon Shin-Chan movie, "Crayon Shin-chan: The Legend of the Buri Buri 3 Minutes Charge", in which he played a monster that made fun of the sliding timescale of the cartoon (and thereby breaking the Fourth Wall).

After the novelty wore thin on the gimmick, he began to intermittently make appearances on variety shows under the Yoku Hata pseudonym and in regular street clothes. He has recently begun to bring back the "Guitar Zamurai" character sporadically, to play on its nostalgic appeal. In 2008, he formed a clique with other one-hit wonder comedians on the quiz/variety show Quiz! Hexagon II; their group was called "Ippatsuya 2008" (一発屋2008).

== Discography ==
- ギター侍のうた (Guitar Samurai's Song, Gitaa-zamurai no uta) (Single, November 17, 2004)
- ギター侍は波田陽区。 (Yoku Hata is the Guitar Samurai, Gitaa-zamurai wa Hata Yoku) (DVD, December 1, 2004)
- ギター侍のうた弐～完全保存盤～ (Guitar Samurai's Second Song - all-inclusive recording, Gitaa-zamurai no uta ni - kanzen hozen ban) (CD and DVD bundle, February 9, 2005)
