= Nonami Takizawa =

Japanese gravure idol (born 1985)

- Born: December 14, 1985 (age 40); Gunma prefecture, Japan
- Occupations: gravure idol; actress; singer
- Years active: 2002–2011
- Modeling information
- Height: 155 cm (5 ft 1 in)
- Hair color: Black
- Eye color: Dark Brown

Nonami Takizawa (滝沢乃南, Takizawa Nonami; born December 14, 1985) is a Japanese gravure idol, and a female talent. She is best known for her voluptuous figure. She is from Gunma, and her nickname is 'Nonamin'. She retired from modeling as of 2011.

== Bibliography ==
=== Photographs ===
- Hajimemashite Nonami Desu (はじめましてのなみです / Nice to Meet You, I'm Nonami), 2002 ISBN 978-4-401-62248-1
- Minasama ☆ Konnichiwa (*^o^*) (みなさま☆こんにちは（＊^○^＊） / Hello, Everybody (*^o^*)), 2003 ISBN 978-4-401-62253-5
- Naked Peach, 2008 ISBN 978-4-8470-4113-6
- Grand Finale, 2010 ISBN 978-4-09-103085-6

=== Magazines ===
- FRIDAY DYNAMITE 2011 1/5 Issue, 2010 EAN 491-0-22-218011-3

== Filmography ==
=== Dramas ===
==== Stage Drama(s) ====
- Gekidan Taishu Shosetsuka "Muteki-na Otokotachi"(劇団たいしゅう小説家 「無敵な男達」), 2006

==== TV Dramas ====
- Water Boys 2005 Natsu – Role of Michiru Buritani, 2005
- Akihabara@DEEP – Role of Mikiko, the Guest Cast of the episode 9, 2006

==== Movies ====
- Akiba, 2006
- Making of Hyakka Ryoran (大奥 百花繚乱), 2008
- Hyakka Ryoran (百花繚乱), 2009
- Jaws in Japan (ジョーズ・イン・ジャパン), 2009
- Ibutsu Actress "Byoto no Rinjin" (遺物 アクトレス『病棟の隣人』), 2010

=== Image Videos ===
- Pure Smile, 2003
- Cover Girls Nonami Takizawa & Ayano Yamamoto (カバーガールズ 滝沢乃南 & 山本彩乃), 2003
- Nonami Takizawa in the Six Senses (滝沢乃南 in The Six Senses), 2003
- Pure (ピュア), 2004
- Venus (ヴィーナス), 2004
- Se-jo! Nonami Takizawa (Se-女! 滝沢乃南), 2004
- Mitsumete... (見つめて... / Look at Me), 2004
- Majeur, 2005
- Hakutokyo (白桃郷 / Arcadia with White Peaches), 2006
- Anata to... (あなたと... / With you...), 2006
- Nagomi (和～nagomi / The Calmness), 2007
- Toubou (逃亡), 2007
- Rakuen (楽園), 2007
- Dear..., 2007
- My Darling, 2008
- Itazura na Shisen (悪戯な視線 / Mischievous Glance), 2008
- KURA-KURA ~ Nonamin in Hawaii (KURA-KURA~のなみんinハワイ), 2008
- YURA-YURA ~ Nonamin in Japan (YURA-YURA~のなみんinジャパン), 2008
- Suki Dakara... (好きだから・・・), 2009
- Yawa Hada (柔肌), 2009
- Shirahada tenshi (白肌天使 / Fair-skinned Angel), 2010
- Himitsu Yuugi, (ヒミツ遊戯), 2010
- Finale 1, 2010
- Finale 2, 2010

=== DVD Box Sets ===
- Takizawa Nonami Special DVD Box (滝沢乃南 Special DVD-BOX), 2008
- Paradise Box, 2010
- WAKU-WAKU Box, 2011

== Discography ==
=== Singles ===
1. Negau (願), 2005
2. Nonamin No Tenshi ~Ai To Seigi No Tame Ni~ (のなみんの天使~愛と正義のために~), 2007
3. B-Blue, 2007

=== Albums ===
1. Glory Story, 2008
2. Peach, 2008

== Miscellaneous ==
- Nonami Takizawa Hug Cushion, 2005
- Nonami Takizawa Calendar 2009, 2008
