= Tokio Emoto =

Japanese actor (born 1989)

- 柄本 時生
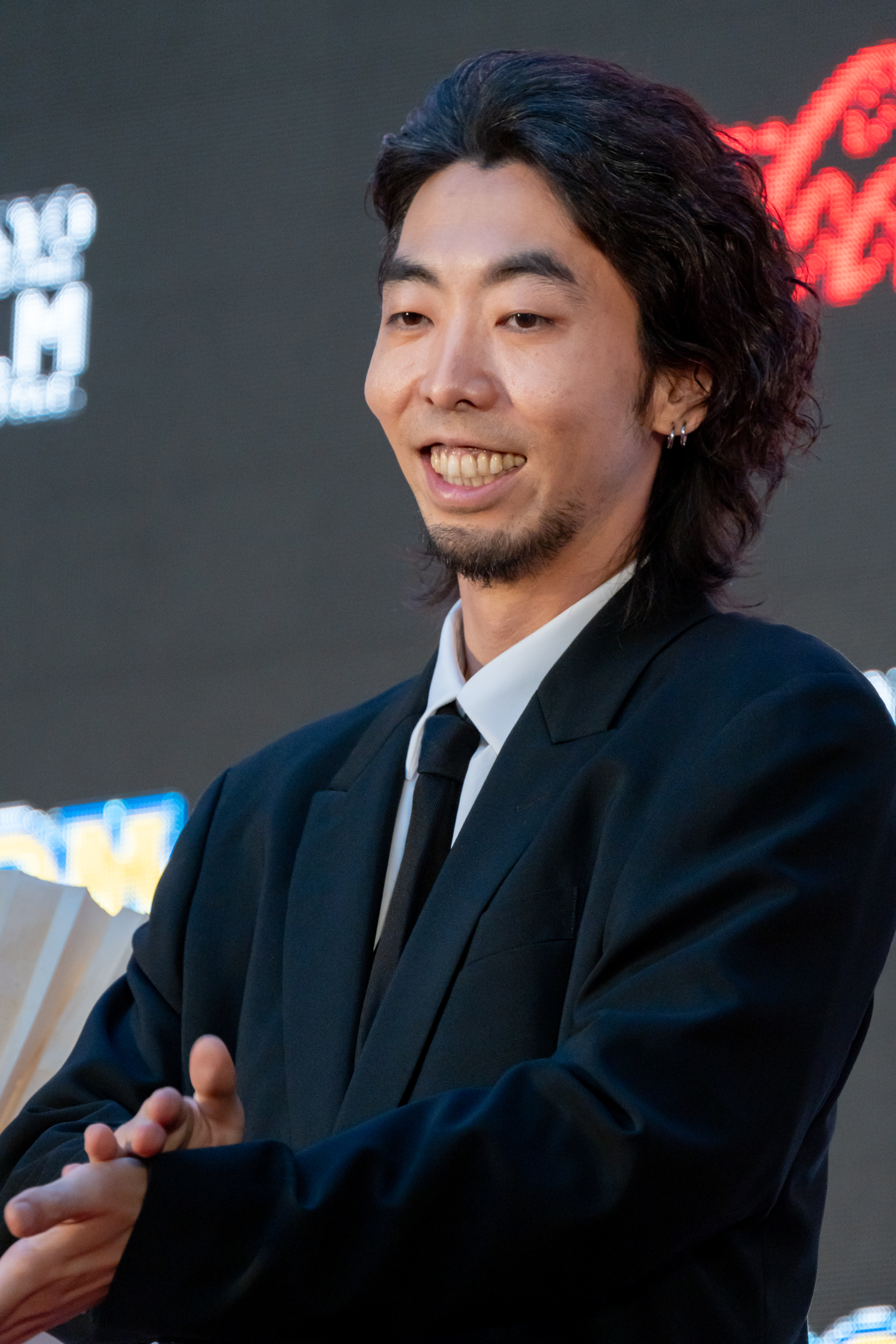
- Emoto at the 36th Tokyo International Film Festival in October 2023
- Born: October 17, 1989 (age 37); Tokyo, Japan
- Occupation: Actor
- Years active: 2003–present
- Agent: Knockout
- Spouses: Mari Iriki (m. 2020; div. 2022); Honami Sato (m. 2025)
- Children: 1
- Parents: Akira Emoto (father); Kazue Tsunogae (mother)
- Relatives: Tasuku Emoto (brother); Sakura Ando (sister-in-law)
- Website: Official profile

Tokio Emoto (柄本 時生, Emoto Tokio; born October 17, 1989) is a Japanese actor.

== Biography ==
Emoto's father is Akira Emoto, his mother is Kazue Tsunogae, and his brother is Tasuku Emoto.

In 2003, Emoto had his acting debut in the film, Jam Films S.

Up until around 2011, he maintained a part-time job in Shimokitazawa while acting. As of July 2015, his job was in a T-shirt shop.

== Personal life ==
=== Marriage ===
Emoto married actress Mari Iriki on her 30th birthday on February 16, 2020. The two met in 2008 while co-starring in a drama and became close. After being friends for 12 years, they began dating in the fall of 2019.

On June 6, 2022, Iriki announced through a post on her official social media account that she had divorced Emoto but that the two would remain friends. This was later confirmed by both agencies, who asked for their continued support of the two as individuals.

On November 13, 2025, Emoto announced his second marriage through his official Instagram account to band drummer and actress, Honami Sato. The two met while co-starring in a 2024 drama. A year later on September 22, 2026, he and his wife shared that they had become parents as they had welcomed their first child together.

== Filmography ==
=== TV series ===
Year	Title	Role	Notes	Ref.
2006	Kōmyō ga Tsuji	Emperor Go-Yōzei	Taiga drama	
2011	Sunshine	Takeo Miyamoto	Asadora	
2013	Yae's Sakura	Kanamori Tsuin	Taiga drama	
2019	The Naked Director	Kosuke Mitamura		
2019	Idaten	Manchō	Taiga drama	
2020	North Light	Yutaka Ishimaki	Miniseries	
2021	Zenkamono		Miniseries	
2024	House of Ninjas	Masamitsu Oki		
2024	Baby Assassins Everyday!	Akira Hino		
2025	Masked Ninja Akakage	Hideyoshi Hashiba		
2025–26	The Ghost Writer's Wife	Saiji Yamahashi	Asadora	
2026	Water Margin	Bai Sheng		

=== Films ===
Year	Title	Role	Notes	Ref.
2008	Naoko	Kosei Okuda		
2008	Ain't no Tomorrows	Hiruma	Lead role	
2009	Slackers	Tomu Kidokoro	Lead role	
2014	Samurai Hustle	Masuda Hirotada		
2016	Samurai Hustle Returns	Masuda Hirotada		
2020	The Craft of Memories			
2021	Blue			
2021	The Supporting Actors: The Movie	Himself		
2021	Cube	First Man		
2023	Ichikei's Crow: The Movie	Jun Doi		
2023	My Brother, the Alien			
2023	Perfect Days	Takashi	Japanese-German film	
2024	Samurai Detective Onihei: Blood for Blood			
2025	Scarlet	Laertes (voice)		
2026	Coffee After All			
2026	Sinsin and the Mouse	Club Manager	Japanese-Taiwanese film	
2026	The Mouths	Nishi		
2027	Samurai Hustle: Full Throttle	Masuda Hirotada		
2027	Last Vacation			

=== Japanese dub ===
Year	Title	Role	Notes	Ref.
2018	Mutafukaz	Vinz		
