= Maiko (actress) =

Japanese-American actress (born 1985)

- マイコ
- Born: March 15, 1985 (age 41); Seattle, United States
- Occupation: Actress
- Years active: 2006–present
- Agent: GR Promotion
- Height: 1.68 m (5 ft 6 in)
- Spouse: Satoshi Tsumabuki (m. 2016)
- Children: 2
- Website: Official profile

Maiko (マイコ; born March 15, 1985, in Seattle, United States) is a Japanese actress who is represented by the talent agency GR Promotion.

== Career ==
=== Early life ===
Maiko was born on March 15, 1985, in Seattle, USA to an American father and Japanese mother.

=== Career beginnings ===
Maiko was a subject to a longing scout and auditioned in the entertainment industry when she was a teenager. She received a corporate advertising audition for Shiseido and debuted in an advertisement in 2006.

Maiko's first starring role was in the film, Yama no Anata: Tokuichi no Koi, with Tsuyoshi Kusanagi in 2008. In 2010, she appeared in the NHK Taiga drama, Ryōmaden. Maiko later become the third-generation member of Choya Umeshu's Sarari to Shita Umeshu. In 2011, she appeared in the NHK Asadora, Ohisama, and in December of the same year, her debut in stage is 8 Women.

In 2014, Maiko played Ayumi Himekawa in Glass Mask, and later appeared in many films, television series, stage shows, and advertisements.

== Personal life ==
Maiko married actor Satoshi Tsumabuki on August 4, 2016, after being in a relationship for four years. They met in 2012 when they co-starred in the Fuji TV drama "Keigo Higashino Mysteries."

Maiko and her husband have two children together. Their first child was born on December 11, 2019, and their second child on September 13, 2022.

== Filmography ==
=== TV series ===
Year	Title	Role	Network	Notes	Ref.
2010	Ryōmaden	Iwasaki Kizei	NHK	Taiga drama	
2010	Shinzanmono	Yusatoru Yamamoto	TBS		
2011	Sunshine	Machiko Soma	NHK	Asadora	
2011	Nazotoki wa Dinner no Ato de	Yumi Kanno	Fuji TV	Episode 5	
2012	Ren Ai Kentei	Sayo Kagawa	NHK BS Premium	Episode 2	
2012	Keigo Tono Mysteries	Kiyomi Hatakeyama	Fuji TV	Episode 6	
2013	Made in Japan	Kanae Obata	NHK		
2013	Pin to Kona	Mizuki	TBS		
2013	Kyōryū Sensei	Noko Shiozaki	NHK BS Premium	Lead role	
2014	Shinichi Hoshi Mystery SP	K	Fuji TV		
2014	Tsuma wa, Kunoichi: Sai Shūshō	Shizuko	NHK BS Premium		
2015	Ryūsei Wagon	Kaori Hashimoto's best friend	TBS	Episode 5	
2015	Massan	Taeko Kawano	NHK	Asadora	
2015	Dr.Rintarō	Makiko Miura	NTV	Episode 4	
2021	Welcome Home, Monet	Natsu Inoue	NHK	Asadora	
2023	What Will You Do, Ieyasu?	Oeyo	NHK	Taiga drama	

=== Films ===
Year	Title	Role	Notes
2008	Yama no Anata: Tokuichi no Koi	Michiho Misawa	
2009	Waiting for Good News	Ko	
2009	Yamagata Scream	Katsumiko	
2009	Black Gaisha ni Tsutome Teru Naga, mō Ore wa Genkai Kamo Shirenai	Nakanishi-san	
2009	Snow Prince	Yasuko Hasegawa	
2010	Space Battleship Yamato	Aihara	
2011	Milocroze: A Love Story	Milocroze	
2014	Bilocation-Hyō	Sayuri Mitamura / Sayuri Izuka	
2014	Bilocation-Ura	Sayuri Mitamura / Sayuri Izuka	
2014	Over Your Dead Body	Kayoko Kurata	
