= Kyoko Fukada =

Japanese actress and singer (born 1982)

- 深田 恭子
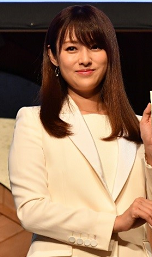
- Fukada in December 2017
- Born: November 2, 1982 (age 43); Kita, Tokyo, Japan
- Other name: Fukakyon (深キョン)
- Education: Horikoshi High School
- Occupations: Actress; singer
- Years active: 1996–present
- Agent: Horipro
- Partner: Hiroyuki Sugimoto (2018–2023)
- Musical career
- Genres: J-pop; instrumental
- Instruments: Vocals; piano
- Label: Pony Canyon

Kyoko Fukada (深田 恭子, Fukada Kyōko; born 2 November 1982) is a Japanese actress and singer. She is represented by the agency Horipro. She won the award for Best Actress at the Yokohama Film Festival for Kamikaze Girls.

== Early life and career ==
Kyoko Fukada was born in Tokyo on 2 November 1982 and raised there. On 20 October 1996, she won the 21st Talent Scout Caravan Grand Prix Award as part of the "Pure Girl Audition" at the age of 13. She began her career as an actress in 1997 with the first appearance in the television series Sore ga Kotae da! as Kazune Mizuno. Fukada appeared in her first movie Ring 2 as Kanae Sawaguchi in 1999 and in later in School Day of the Dead, released in 2000. She graduated from Horikoshi High School in 2001.

In 2002, she made an appearance in Dolls as Haruna. Fukada is also a J-pop singer and her debut single "The Last Fruit" led to her album "Dear…", both released by Pony Canyon in 1999. In July 2023, Pony Canyon released all her music internationally on digital streaming platforms, as well as online music stores in Japan.

In 2021, it was announced that she had been diagnosed with adjustment disorder and would be taking a break from activities to focus on treatment. She said that she had been prone to falling ill since around spring of the previous year, and this month a doctor diagnosed her with adjustment disorder. The company stated, "As a result, we will be prioritizing treatment for the time being and will be taking a break from work." Due to her hiatus, she will also be stepping down from her role in the drama series My Oshi no Oujisama, which she was scheduled to appear in from July 2021. She announced on her Instagram on September 2, 2021, that she had finished her hiatus and would be resuming her activities.

== Personal life ==
In 2018, Fukada was revealed to be in a relationship with multi-millionaire businessman Hiroyuki Sugimoto, and the pair later confirmed the news separately. In early 2020, Fukada was spotted entering an establishment with a ring on her left hand, while Sugimoto was reported to have bought an apartment complex in an affluent neighborhood in Minato ward, leading to speculation that the couple would be getting married soon. However, in 2023, it was revealed that Sugimoto had ended their relationship, citing Fukada's alleged affair with a film director, whose identity was not disclosed.

== Filmography ==
=== Films ===
| Year | Title | Role | Notes | Ref. |
|---|---|---|---|---|
| 1999 | Ring 2 | Kanae Sawaguchi | | |
| 2000 | Shisha no Gakuensai | Machiko Yuki | Lead role | |
| 2003 | Like Asura | Sakiko Jinnai | | |
| 2004 | Kamikaze Girls | Momoko Ryugasaki | Lead role | |
| 2005 | The Inugamis | Haru | | |
| 2009 | Yatterman | Doronjo | | |
| 2013 | Roommate | Reiko Nishimura | Lead role | |
| 2014 | Samurai Hustle | Osaki | | |
| 2015 | Joker Game | Rin | | |
| 2016 | Samurai Hustle Returns | Osaki | | |
| 2018 | Recall | Fumie Akamatsu | | |
| 2021 | Daughter of Lupin the Movie | Hana Mikumo | Lead role | |
| 2024 | Cells at Work! | Hepatocyte | | |
| 2027 | Samurai Hustle: Full Throttle | Osaki | | |

=== Television ===
| Year | Title | Role | Notes | Ref. |
|---|---|---|---|---|
| 1998 | Precious Time | Masaki Kano | | |
| 1999 | Oni no Sumika | Ayumi Kato | Lead role | |
| 1999 | To Heart: Koishite Shinitai | Toko Miura | | |
| 2001 | Strawberry on the Shortcake | Yui Misawa | | |
| 2004 | Minami-kun no Koibito | Chiyomi | Lead role | |
| 2005–06 | Fugo Keiji | Miwako Kanbe | Lead role; 2 seasons | |
| 2007 | Yama Onna Kabe Onna | Marie Mariya | Lead role | |
| 2009 | Tenchijin | Yodo-dono | Taiga drama | |
| 2010 | Natsu no Koi wa Nijiiro ni Kagayaku | | Episode 10 | |
| 2010 | Second Virgin | Marie Suzuki | | |
| 2012 | Tairano Kiyomori | Taira no Tokiko | Taiga drama | |
| 2016 | Please Love Me | Michiko Shibata | Lead role | |
| 2019 | A Story to Read When You First Fall in Love | Junko Harumi | Lead role | |
| 2019–20 | Daughter of Lupin | Hana Mikumo | Lead role; 2 seasons | |
| 2023 | 18/40: Unbreakable Bond of Dreams | Toko Naruse | Lead role | |

=== Japanese dub ===
| Year | Title | Role | Notes | Ref. |
|---|---|---|---|---|
| 2010 | Alice in Wonderland | White Queen | Voice dub for Anne Hathaway | |
| 2016 | Alice Through the Looking Glass | White Queen | Voice dub for Anne Hathaway | |

== Discography ==
=== Singles ===
| Date | Single | Oricon Singles Chart | Total sales | Album |
|---|---|---|---|---|
| 1999.05.19 | Saigo no Kajitsu | 4 | 151,790 | Moon |
| 1999.09.01 | Easy Rider | 6 | 100,790 | Moon |
| 2000.02.02 | Kirameki no Shunkan | 16 | 68,000 | Moon |
| 2000.07.19 | How? | 20 | 48,290 | Universe |
| 2001.06.06 | Swimming | 15 | 47,960 | Universe |
| 2001.10.03 | Kimi no Hitomi ni Koishiteru | 8 | 42,010 | Universe |
| 2002.05.22 | Route 246 | 28 | 13,770 | |

=== Albums ===
| Date | Album | Oricon Albums Chart | Total sales |
|---|---|---|---|
| 1999.11.17 | Dear... | 15 | 24,710 |
| 2000.03.15 | Moon | 14 | 56,250 |
| 2001.11.21 | Universe | 19 | 21,430 |
| 2002.08.21 | Flow ～Kyoko Fukada Remixes～ | | |

== Awards and nominations ==
- Japan Academy Prize
  - Japan Academy Prize for Best Newcomer in Shisha no Gakuensai (2000)
  - nominated – Japan Academy Prize for Outstanding Performance by an Actress in a Leading Role in Shisha no Gakuensai (2000)
- Blue Ribbon Awards
  - Blue Ribbon Awards for Best Supporting Actress in Yatterman (2009)
- Mainichi Film Awards
  - Mainichi Film Award for Best Actress in Kamikaze Girls (2004)
- Tokyo Sports Film Awards
  - Tokyo Sports Film Award for Best Actress in Kamikaze Girls (2004)
  - Tokyo Sports Film Award for Best Supporting Actress in Yatterman (2009)
- Miscellaneous awards
  - Golden Arrow Award for Most Promising Actress in Shinjuku Shōnen Tanteidan (1998)
  - Élan d'or for Most Promising Actress in Kamisama, Mō Sukoshi Dake (1998)
  - The Television Academy Award for Best Supporting Actress in Kamisama, Mō Sukoshi Dake (1998)
  - The Television Academy Award for Best Supporting Actress in To Heart: Koishite Shinitai (1999)
  - Nikkan Sports Film Award for Best Newcomer in "Shisha no Gakuensai" (2000)
  - The Television Academy Award for Best Dresser in Fighting Girl (2001)
  - The Television Academy Award for Best Dresser in Remote (2001)
  - Yokohama Film Festival for Best Actress in Kamikaze Girls (2004)
  - Yubari International Fantastic Film Festival for Max Factor Beauty Spirit (2005)
  - The Television Academy Award for Best Actress in Hajimete Koi wo Shita Hi ni Yomu Hanashi (2019)
