= Space Battleship Yamato (2010 film) =

2010 film by Takashi Yamazaki

- Japanese release poster
- Directed by: Takashi Yamazaki
- Screenplay by: Shimako Sato
- Based on: Space Battleship Yamato by Yoshinobu Nishizaki and Leiji Matsumoto
- Produced by: Shūji Abe; Nakazawa Toshiaki
- Starring: Takuya Kimura; Meisa Kuroki; Toshirō Yanagiba; Naoto Ogata; Hiroyuki Ikeuchi; Maiko; Shinichi Tsutsumi; Reiko Takashima; Isao Hashizume; Toshiyuki Nishida; Tsutomu Yamazaki
- Narrated by: Isao Sasaki
- Cinematography: Kōzō Shibasaki
- Edited by: Ryūji Miyajima
- Music by: Naoki Satō
- Production companies: Robot Communications; Sedic International
- Distributed by: Toho
- Release date: December 1, 2010 (Japan)
- Running time: 138 minutes
- Country: Japan
- Language: Japanese
- Budget: $23.9 million
- Box office: ¥4.1 billion (Japan) $49.8 million (worldwide)

Space Battleship Yamato (Japanese: SPACE BATTLESHIP ヤマト, Hepburn: Supēsu Batorushippu Yamato) is a 2010 Japanese science fiction film based on the Space Battleship Yamato anime series by Yoshinobu Nishizaki and Leiji Matsumoto. The film was released in Japan on December 1, 2010. It was released on DVD and Blu-ray in Japan on June 24, 2011, and in the United States by Funimation's live-action client, Giant Ape Media, on April 29, 2014.

== Plot ==
In 2199, after years of attacks by alien Gamilas which rendered the surface of Earth uninhabitable and forcing humanity underground, the people of the Earth Defense Force launch a counter-offensive near Mars. The fleet's weapons are no match for the Gamilas, who easily wipe out much of the force. During the battle, EDF captain Mamoru Kodai volunteers to use his damaged ship, the destroyer Yukikaze, as a shield to cover Captain Jyuzo Okita's battleship, allowing his escape. Mamoru's ship is destroyed.

On Earth, Mamoru's brother Susumu is scavenging on the irradiated surface near the half-buried wreck of the battleship Yamato, when an object impacts near him and knocks him unconscious. He awakens to find an alien message capsule. Susumu also notices that the radiation has been reduced to safe levels around him. He is rescued by Okita's returning ship and it is discovered that the capsule contains engineering schematics for a new warp drive and coordinates for the planet from which it came, Iskandar. After learning what happened at Mars, Susumu accuses Okita of using his brother as a living shield and tries to hit him, but crew member Yuki Mori violently stops him.

The radiation that covers the Earth's surface is slowly sinking into the ground, and the scientists predict that the human race will become extinct in one year. Okita believes that the hope for humanity lies at Iskandar. A request for volunteers for the mission is sent out, saying that Iskandar possesses a device that can remove the effects of radiation. Kodai – a former EDF pilot – decides to reenlist. Their last battleship, the long-dead Yamato, is rebuilt and enhanced with alien technology. Before the Yamato can launch, the Gamilas attack with a gigantic missile. Captain Okita gives the order to fire the yet-untested Wave Motion Cannon, which successfully destroys the incoming missile. Kodai is reunited with his old fighter squad. Yuki, who joined the EDF years ago because she admired Kodai, is bitter towards him, believing he left out of fear.

The Yamato crewmen perform their first warp test and encounter more Gamilas ships. Since the Wave Motion Cannon is powered by the same reactor as the warp drive, the Yamato crewmen have to wait until the engine recharges before they can warp again. The Yamato destroys the alien capital ships, but the battle damages Yuki's fighter. Kodai launches to rescue her and is sent to the brig for disobeying orders. Shima, Kodai's former squadmate and Yamato's navigator, tells Yuki that Kodai left the service because he accidentally caused the death of his own parents and also nearly Shima's pregnant wife during a mission.

After warping out of the Milky Way, the Yamato crewmen find a Gamilas fighter adrift and recover it to study. At the same time, Captain Okita goes into cardiac arrest and is revealed to be terminally ill. However, the alien pilot is still alive and possesses Commando Team Leader Hajime Saitō, in order to communicate. The alien calls himself Dessla and says the Gamilas are the racing aliens with a hive mind. Kodai stuns the possessed Saito and the alien apparently is destroyed.

Later, an ailing Captain Okita makes Kodai the acting-captain. He also reveals that the capsule contained only the plans for the Wave Motion Engine and the coordinates to Iskandar, and the idea of the device was made up to give humanity hope. The Yamato crewmen discover the captured Gamilas fighter which contains a homing beacon, giving away their position. The Yamato fires its Wave Motion Cannon to destroy a Gamilas ship, but a stealth Gamilas spacecraft latches onto the ship's occupied third bridge on the bottom of the hull and begins a self-destruct sequence. Kodai reluctantly orders Yuki, in her fighter, to blast the third bridge support away moments before it detonates, saving the Yamato but killing several crewmates. Kodai apologizes to Yuki for ordering her to doom their crewmates, and they have a romantic moment as the Yamato warps again.

The Yamato arrives at Iskandar, but is met by the Gamilas from the large fleet who send a spacecraft to obstruct the muzzle of the Wave Motion Cannon. With their main weapon disabled, Kodai makes the dangerous choice to conduct a random warp and ends up at the opposite side of Iskandar. They are surprised to see that it is lifeless, and in fact strongly resembles Earth in its presently irradiated state. It is then discovered that Gamilas and Iskandar are the same planet. The crewmates of the Yamato think it is a trap, but Kodai urges them to go ahead. Kodai leads an attack party to the planet's surface against heavy Gamilas opposition. Much of the assaulters are killed, and the remaining pilots stay behind to cover for Kodai, science officer Sanada, Saito and Mori as they head for the coordinates.

Once they reach the coordinates, an alien possesses Yuki's body and explains that the Gamilas and Iskandar are two aspects of the same race. The alien says their planet is dying and they saw the Earth as the most suitable replacement, after first killing off humanity. Iskandar did not agree with it and so they were imprisoned. Iskandar implants in Yuki the ability to cleanse the radiation from Earth. As she and Kodai return to the Yamato, Saito and Sanada sacrifice themselves by destroying the Gamilas power source, destroying most of the Gamilas forces. The Yamato returns to Earth, where Okita dies. The crewmen of the Yamato rejoice at their return home, but a surviving Gamilas ship ambushes them and severely damages the battleship, disabling all of its weapons. Dessla appears and says they no longer wish to invade the Earth. However, since the majority of the Gamilas were killed, he intends to destroy the planet with his ship to avenge the racing Gamilas. Kodai orders the surviving crewmen of the Yamato to abandon ship before he pilots the Yamato on a kamikaze attack against Dessla's ship. He fires the blocked Wave Motion Cannon, which vaporizes both spaceships.

The ending shows Yuki standing with a child, Kodai's son, on the Earth's surface which is now restored to its original state.

== Cast ==
The main cast of characters differ from that of the original series. Yuki has a more active fighting role, and two of the series' main male characters – Aihara and Dr. Sado – were recast as women.

=== Yamato crew ===
- Takuya Kimura as Susumu Kodai
- Meisa Kuroki as Yuki Mori, Black Tiger Squadron ace pilot
- Toshirō Yanagiba as Shirō Sanada, chief science/technology Officer
- Naoto Ogata as Daisuke Shima, chief navigator
- Reiko Takashima as Dr. Sado, chief medical officer
- Toshiyuki Nishida as Hikozaemon Tokugawa, chief engineer
- Hiroyuki Ikeuchi as Hajime Saitō, Space Commandos leader
- Maiko Skorick as Aihara, communications officer
- Toshihiro Yashiba as Yasuo Nanbu, tactical unit
- Kazuki Namioka as Saburō Katō, Black Tiger Squadron commander
- Takumi Saito as Akira Yamamoto, Black Tiger Squadron member
- Takahiro Miura as Furuya, Black Tiger Squadron member
- Tsutomu Yamazaki as Captain Jūzō Okita
- Kensuke Ōwada as Kenjirō Ōta, navigator
- Miyū Sawai as Higashida

=== Others ===
- Shinichi Tsutsumi as Mamoru Kodai, Susumu's older brother and captain of the space destroyer Yukikaze
- Isao Hashizume as Heikurō Tōdō, Earth Defense Force commander-in-chief

=== Voice cast ===
The following are actors who were involved with the original series in any capacity.

- Kenichi Ogata as Analyzer, robot assistant of Susumu Kodai.
- Masatō Ibu as Dessla, leader of the "evil" side of the Gamilas.
- Miyuki Ueda as Iskandar, originally named Starsha and leader of the "good" side of the Gamilas.
- Isao Sasaki as Narrator.

== Production ==
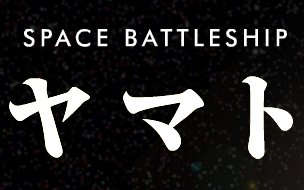
Early Live Action Film Logo found on the movie's official site.

TBS Pictures, the film production arm of the Tokyo Broadcasting System (TBS) television network, had been planning the live action film since 2005. Noboru Ishiguro, director and staff member of the original Space Battleship Yamato series, confirmed at his Otakon panel on July 17, 2009, that a live action version of Space Battleship Yamato was in development.

Director Takashi Yamazaki helmed the project for a planned December 2010 release with a budget of 2.2 billion yen (US$22 million). The film features extensive VFX produced by Yamazaki's visual effects house Shirogumi, amounting to 65 minutes of the film's running time in over 500 shots. The Daily Sports newspaper reported that 80% of the scenes incorporate the latest CGI technology to recreate the space battles from the television series. Having been moved by the 3D scenes of Avatar, Takuya Kimura, who plays Susumu Kodai, lobbied with Yamazaki to improve the quality of the movie's CGI scenes and reshoot them if possible. Because of the danger of getting overbudget, he also agreed to sacrifice part of his talent fee to keep the cost down.

Erika Sawajiri was originally scheduled to also star in the film as the female lead character Yuki Mori, but was replaced by Meisa Kuroki.

Principal photography began on October 12, 2009, and was completed by year's end. Computer graphics, editing, and other elements of post-production took over nine months before Toho opened the film on December 1, 2010, on 440 screens in Japan.

== Promotion and distribution ==
Space Battleship Yamato was released in Japan on December 1, 2010.

One of the first images of the titular spaceship shown on the official site.

On September 16, Tokyograph reported that Aerosmith's Steven Tyler wrote a song, titled "Love Lives", for the film based on an English translated script and several clips of the film. The song is also performed by Tyler and was released on November 24, 2010, a week before the film is released. A preview of the song is heard in the official trailer.

The film has been licensed for international distribution by several companies: Wild Side Films (France), Splendid Film (Germany), Golden Harvest (China, Hong Kong and Macau), CatchPlay (Taiwan), Encore Films (Singapore, Malaysia, Brunei and Indonesia), Funimation (United States and Canada), Nexo Digital (Italy), Manga Entertainment (United Kingdom and Ireland), Madman Entertainment (Australia, New Zealand, Papua New Guinea and Fiji) and Sahamongkol Film International Co. Ltd. (Thailand). Mediatres Studio made a deal with TBS Company for home video distribution of the film in Spain. The film will be released on DVD in that country under the "Winds of Asia" quality seal and will be sold through the Spanish division of Warner Home Video, the home entertainment division of "Big Six" Hollywood film studio Warner Bros., a subsidiary of American conglomerate Time Warner since 1990.

Different DVD and Blu-ray editions were released in Japan on June 24, 2011.

Manabu Wakui also wrote the novelization of the film. The book further explains the story behind the 2194 planet bomb attacks and also includes a scene where Shima's mute son, Jiro, finally speaks for the first time upon seeing the Yamato survivors' arrival.

== Reception ==
=== Box office ===
Space Battleship Yamato debuted at number 1 on the Japanese box-office, ousting Harry Potter and the Deathly Hallows – Part 1. It went on to gross ¥4.1 billion ($51.37 million) in Japan, becoming the fourth highest-grossing domestic film of 2011. It also grossed $664,003 overseas, in Hong Kong, Singapore, Taiwan and Thailand.

Zac Bertschy of the Anime News Network rated the film a B, calling it "a thoroughly modernized adaptation, one that hits the gas pedal right out of the gate and doesn't stop for a moment, unashamed to just try and entertain the hell out of you."

The Japan Times gave the film a positive review. The reviewer said the pressure of releasing a film with much corporate backing and expectations by die-hard fans put much stress on the production team, but they were able to have sufficient entertaining fare for kids and make serious drama work.

The Hollywood Reporter stated that the movie had a "sleek futurist look without losing sight of the 70s illustration style" of the original series in spite of a small budget (compared with other Western sci-fi movies).

On the other hand, Christoph Mark of The Daily Yomiuri said the film "lacked gravity" and criticized the production design as too reminiscent of the Battlestar Galactica remake.
