= Quiz! Hexagon II =

- Hiroshi Shinagawa incorrectly answers a trivia question for which the response is Wikipedia. Yusuke Kamiji, Akina Minami, and Nozomi Tsuji sit behind him.
- Presented by: Shinsuke Shimada
- Country of origin: Japan

Production
- Running time: 57 minutes

Original release
- Network: Fuji Television
- Release: 19 October 2005 – 28 September 2011

Quiz! Hexagon II (クイズ！ヘキサゴンII, Kuizu! Hekisagon Tsū) was a Japanese quiz variety show on Fuji Television, airing Wednesdays from 19:00-19:57 Japan Standard Time. The show began airing on October 19, 2005, ending on September 28, 2011 with 247 episodes aired; its predecessor, Quiz! Hexagon - This Evening is a Quiz Parade!! (クイズ！ヘキサゴン 今夜はクイズパレード!!, Kuizu! Hekisagon Kon'ya wa Kuizu Parēdo!!) aired from June 5 through October 12, 2005.

== Summary ==
Quiz! Hexagon II was hosted by Shinsuke Shimada and Hitomi Nakamura. Guests on the show often included Japanese owarai comedians and tarento. Since 2007, a number of music subgroups have formed that have released singles; among the most popular of these have been Shuchishin and Pabo.

During each episode, three teams (the membership of which was determined based on a paper quiz show participants took prior to each episode) competed for points in various quizzes, testing team members' knowledge on a variety of topics.

=== Change from Quiz! Hexagon ===
Due to the low ratings of the previous show "Quiz! Hexagon" (which aired from July 7, 2002 - October 10, 2005) chairman Shinsuke Shimada accepted a request for an update to the show, and beginning the following week (June 15, 2005) - with the added subtitle "This Evening is a Quiz Parade" - the show became a battle between three six-member teams. Later, Shinsuke said in an interview published in the special extra-large summer issue (August 14/21, 2008) of the magazine Shukan Bunshun (週刊文春しゅうかん ぶんしゅん), "It was not the renewal season, but the producer quickly agreed. All around it was like the quick fix of a government office."

=== Change to Wednesdays at 19:00 JST ===
From October 19, 2005 to the present, the name was changed to "Hexagon II Quiz Parade" (ヘキサゴンII クイズパレード), and the broadcast time was moved up one hour to Wednesdays at 19:00 JST. The official title was "Quiz! Hexagon II," but within the show in the logo and in Shinsuke's title call, it became "Hexagon II Quiz Parade!!

Recently, it has become a common occurrence for the ratings to rise in the last 10% of the show (last 20% of a special), and there have also been times when the show surpasses the competing program "The Large 100 Million Person Questionnaire?! Laugh and Try to Endure!" (1億人の大質問!?笑ってコラえて!（いちおくにんのだいしつもん!?わらってコラえて!）; Nippon TV). Also, around the times of reorganization and in exceptional instances, the production of 2-3 hour specials has become common, but recently even in times of reorganization the production of regular shows also occurs.

On January 2, 2008, from 19:00 - 21:54 JST, it was broadcast as the replacement for the year-end special program Quiz$Millionaire (クイズ$ミリオネア) that had run on January 2 from 2001 to 2007 (with a New Year's show in 2005 and a special show in 2005) but had ended regular production. (The same occurred in 2009).

The show's best ratings were on September 3, 2008, when it received 23.5% in the Kantō region (Fuji TV). In the Kansai region (Kansai TV), the August 1, 2008 2-hour special had a rating of 29.6%. (According to Video Research, Ltd.)

According to the Children & Media Opinion Poll sponsored by the Japanese National PTA Convention, under the category of "Programs Parents Do Not Want to Show Their Children" it ranked 6th in 2009, having been 7th in 2008, but on the other hand it was ranked 8th in the category "Programs to Show Children."

=== O-baka Tarento ===
Those who give strange answers are mocked as O-baka Tarento, 'Foolish celebrities'.

In the early stages of the program, people like Shin Koda, Akane Osawa, and Saki Fukuda became semi-regulars, and within the program they were dealt with as "O-baka," but beginning around the time of September 2006, when Mai Satoda became a semi-regular, the situation changed. She did not once beat the other regular guests in the preliminary test and came to monopolize the lowest ranking, and the "Obaka tarento" who had appeared to this point little by little stopped being treated as "Baka." Due to this, from all around the image of "Last Place = Satoda" became strong and it often became joke material. However, in 2007 guests at the same level or worse than Satoda - such as Takeshi Tsuruno, Yukina Kinoshita, Suzanne, Yusuke Kamiji, and Naoki Nokubo - became semi-regulars, and Satoda's monopolized status was reduced. From there, the six people - joined with Satoda - were called the "6-man Baka Group," and became featured performers on the show. In 2007, the CD debuts of the three women, as Pabo, and the three men, as Shuchishin (when together, the six-person group was called aladdin), were huge hits. Currently, they have moved from semi-regulars to become regulars, and have become popular tarento, become regulars on other shows as well.

In 2008, the popularity of misono, who was at the same level as the other six, rose when she became a semi-regular. She appeared as a guest on various shows, and the song Ninin Sankyaku (二人三脚, Three Legged Race), released in June, entered into the top 10, her first since her debut as a solo artist.

Beginning in the latter half of 2008, a number of popular performers with low test scores (referred to by Shinsuke as "High-Popularity Baka") have become semi-regulars: beginning in June 2008, Akina Minami; in October 2008, Mari Yaguchi; in 2009, Daisuke Motoki; in April 2009, Shintaro Yamada; in June 2009, Nozomi Tsuji. There are also other regularly appearing "O-baka tarento," such as former professional boxer Yoko Gushiken who has an all-time average of 4 points (out of a possible 50) in the qualifying paper test.

=== Program Proceedings ===
Prior to the beginning of the show a 50-question preliminary paper test was given to the performers. At the opening of the show the results of the preliminary paper test were announced, and based on ranking three teams were formed with an equal division of knowledge level. These three teams competed in quizzes for the purpose of attaining the cash prize, and the team with the most points at the end of all stages became the winner. (In the case that at the very end the top score was matched by multiple teams, the bottom-ranked members of those teams once more completed in a one question, one shot playoff, with the person who correctly answered the question becoming champion.)

In the early parts of 2008, there was a rule that in the case of sudden death, the quiz would take place at the pool used for the Action Quiz, but eventually as it did not reach sudden death, the action quiz was ended and not used after all.

=== Cancellation ===
The show came to an end in September 2011, after host Shinsuke Shimada was forced to retire from show business due to his connections with the Yamaguchi-gumi.

== Program ==
- Chairman: Shinsuke Shimada
  - On the October 22, 2008 show, he appeared under the name "Cassius Shimada," in charge of lyrics and songwriting.
- Program Assistant: Hitomi Nakamura (Fuji Television Announcer)
- Questioner: Toshiyuki Makihara (Fuji Television Announcer)
  - Additionally, the following people have been employed as question narrators: Toshihiro Ito (Fuji Television Announcer, for "Belt Quiz: Time Shock! Shock!" that occurred during the May 6, 2009 Jumprope Quiz), Tetsuo Sakaguchi (for "Quiz! First Usage" that took place March 28, 2007), Tetsuya Aoshima & Kenji Fukui (Dual Fuji Television Announcers), Hideki Yamanaka (at the time, a Fuji Television Announcer, now freelance).
- Assistant: Kazuha Sakiyama (until August 2008), Ayumi, and others
- Narrator: Mayumi Tanaka

== Principal contestants ==
- "Hexagon Family" is the name that has come to be used for regular participants in Hexagon.

=== Male participants ===
- Shuchishin
  - Yusuke Kamiji
  - Takeshi Tsuruno
- Keisuke Okada
- Fujiwara (owarai duo)
  - Takayuki Haranishi
  - Toshifumi Fujimoto
- Eiji Bandō
- Shinagawa Shōji (owarai duo)
  - Hiroshi Shinagawa
  - Tomoharu Shōji
- Yoshio Kojima
- Chris Matsumura
- Hiromi Sakimoto
- Ungirls (owarai duo)
  - Yoshiaki Yamane
  - Takushi Tanaka
- LaSalle Ishii
- Daisuke Motoki
- Shintarō Yamada
- Masayuki Watanabe
- Tetsuya Kanmuri

=== Female participants ===
- Pabo
  - Yukina Kinoshita
  - Mai Satoda
  - Suzanne
- Misono
- Akina Minami
- Mari Yaguchi

=== Former participants ===
- Naoki Nokubo
- Shin Koda
- Saki Fukuda
- Hidehiko Masuda
- Maimi Okuwa
- Taka and Toshi
- Taro Yabe
- Yuko Ogura
- Mona Yamamoto
- Kuniko Asagi
- Audrey (owarai duo)
  - Toshiaki Kasuga
  - Masayasu Wakabayashi
- Yuuko Mizuno
- Dandy Sakano
- Rika Sato
- Yōku Hata
- Ranko Kanbe
- Nozomi Tsuji
- Akane Osawa

=== Musical units ===
Since 2007, when Pabo was formed as a unit originating from the program, music units have frequently been formed - referred to as the "Hexagon Family" - and on October 22, 2008 the album "We Love Hexagon" was released. Also, since the August 1, 2007 broadcast, song announcements have been made during the ending part of the broadcast, and since March 19, 2008, various units have performed almost every time - as an ending - in the form of a live studio performance.

- Pabo
  - Mai Satoda, Sae "Suzanne" Yamamoto, Yukina Kinoshita
- Shuchishin (羞恥心, Shūchishin)
  - Takeshi Tsuruno(Shu), Naoki Nokubo (Chi), Yusuke Kamiji (Shin)
- Rakuda & Kappa (ラクダとカッパ, Rakuda to Kappa)
  - Chris Matsumura (Rakuda), Yoshiaki Yamene (Kappa)
- Aladdin the Second (アラジン, Arajin)
  - Pabo & Shuchishin
- Misono & Hiroshi (misono&ヒロシ)
  - Misono, Hiroshi Shinagawa
- Air Band (エアバンド, Ea Bando)
  - Keisuke Okada (Kei), Tomoharu Shouji (Tomo), Yoku Hata (Yo), Takeshi Kongochi (Takeshi), Yoshiaki Yamene (Yoshi), Takushi Tanaka (Egashira 3:10 Mae (江頭3時10分前, Egashira San-ji Jū-bun Mae))
- Ippatsuya 2008 (一発屋2008)
  - Dandy Sakano, Yoku Hata, Yoshio Kojima, Takeshi Kongochi
- Mai Satoda with Goda Siblings (里田まい with 合田兄妹, Satoda Mai wizu Gōda Kyōdai)
  - Mai Satoda, Toshifumi Fujimoto (Jaian), Misono (Jaiko)
- Mari Yaguchi
- Tomo & Suzanne (トモとスザンヌ, Tomo to Suzannu)
  - Tomoharu Shouji, Sae "Suzanne" Yamamoto
- Manager & Subordinate (部長と部下, Buchō to Buka)
  - Toshiyuki Makihara (Manager), Hitomi Nakamura (Subordinate)
- Akina Minami and Super Mild Seven (南明奈のスーパーマイルドセブン, Minami Akina no Sūpā Mairudo Sebun)
  - Akina Minami, Hiromi Sakimoto, Yoku Hata, Toshifumi Fujimoto, Takayuki Haranishi, Yoshio Kojima, Chris Matsumura
- Mai Satoda with Goda Family (里田まい with 合田家族, Satoda Mai wizu Gōda Kazoku)
  - Mai Satoda, Toshifumi Fujimoto (Jaian), Misono (Jaiko), Ranko Kanbe (Goda Sister #2)
- Friends (フレンズ, Furenzu)
  - Takeshi Tsuruno, Hiromi Sakimoto
- Suberers (スベラーズ, Suberāzu)
  - Keisuke Okada (Dada Suberi), Yoshio Kojima (Choi Suberi), Yoku Hata (Hata)
- Mari Yaguchi with Straw Hat (矢口真里とストローハット, Yaguchi Mari to Sutorō Hatto)
  - Mari Yaguchi, Akane Osawa, Rika Sato, Daisuke Motoki, Keisuke Okada, Takayuki Haranishi, Hiroshi Shinagawa, Yoshiaki Yamane, Chris Matsumura
- Sata Andagi (サーターアンダギー, Saataa Andagii)
  - Shintaro Yamada (Saataa), Takuya Matsuoka (Andaa), Kohei Mori (Gii)
- Michael & Hanaka (まいける&はなか, Maikeru & Hanaka)
  - Michael Masashi Murakami, Hanaka Tsukita
- Hiroshi Shinagawa & Suberers (品川祐とスベラーズ, Shinagawa Hiroshi to Suberāzu)
  - Hiroshi Shinagawa, Keisuke Okada (Dada Suberi), Yoshio Kojima (Choi Suberi), Yoku Hata (Hata)
- Air Visual Band (エアヴィジュアルバンド, Ea Vijuaru Bando)
  - Tomoharu Shouji (Queen), Yoku Hata (Joker), Yoshiaki Yamane (Ace), Takushi Tanaka (Jack), Ryoei (King)
- Suzanne×Suzanne (スザンヌ×スザンぬ, Suzannu×Suzannu)
  - Sae "Suzanne" Yamamoto (White Suzanne), Tetsuji Sakakibara (Black Suzanne), & Akane Osawa (Black Suzanne's singing voice)
- Tsubasa (ツバサ)
  - Takeshi Tsuruno, Ryoei, Mai Satoda, misono

=== Discography ===
Release name	Group	Release date
"Koi no Hexagon" (恋のヘキサゴン, Koi no Hekisagon; "Hexagon Love")	Pabo	September 26, 2007
"Shuchishin" (羞恥心, Shūchishin; "Shame")	Shuchishin	April 9, 2008
"Rakuda ni Naruzo" (ラクダになるぞ; "Become a Camel!") (DVD)	Rakuda & Kappa	May 21, 2008
"Nakanai de" (泣かないで; "Don't Cry")	Shuchishin	June 25, 2008
"Hi wa, Mata Noboru" (陽は、また昇る; "The Sun Will Rise Again")	Aladdin the Second	July 30, 2008
We Love Hexagon (WE LOVE ♥ ヘキサゴン, Wī Rabu Hekisagon)	Compilation album	October 22, 2008
"Mōsugu Christmas" (もうすぐクリスマス, Mōsugu Kurisumasu; "Christmas is Coming")	Mai Satoda with Goda Siblings	November 12, 2008
"Yowamushi Santa" (弱虫サンタ; "Cowardly Santa")	Shuchishin	December 10, 2008
"Bye Bye" (バイバイ, Bai Bai)	Mai Satoda with Goda Siblings	January 14, 2009
"Seishun Boku/Seishun Ore" (青春 僕/青春 俺; "Youth Me/Youth Me")	Mari Yaguchi VS Air Band	March 25, 2009
"Deaete Yokatta/Odaiba no Onna" (出会えてよかった/お台場の女; "It's Great to Have Met You/The Woman from Odaiba")	Tomo & Suzanne; Manager & Subordinate	May 20, 2009
"I Believe ~Yume o Kanaeru Mahō no Kotoba~/Don't leave me" (I Believe ～夢を叶える魔法の言葉～/Don't leave me; "I Believe (Magic Words to Grant a Dream)/Don't leave me")	Akina Minami and Super Mild Seven; Mai Satoda with Goda Family	June 17, 2009
"Naite mo Ii Desu ka" (泣いてもいいですか; "Can I Cry")	Friends; Hexagon All-Stars	July 15, 2009
"Hitotsu 500 Yen de Kaitorasete Itadakimasu" (ひとつ500円で買い取らせていただきます, Hitotsu Gohyaku En de Kaitorasete Itadakimasu; "We Bought One at 500 Yen, Bon Appétit")	Suberers	September 30, 2009
We Love Hexagon 2009 (WE LOVE ♥ ヘキサゴン 2009, Wī Rabu Hekisagon Nisenkyū)	Compilation album	October 21, 2009
Mai Satoda with Goda Family (里田まい with 合田家族, Satoda Mai wizu Gōda Kazoku)	Mai Satoda with Goda Family	December 9, 2009
"Kaze o Sagashite" (風をさがして; "I'm Looking for a Wind")	Yaguchi Mari with Straw Hat	January 13, 2010
"Yanbarukuina ga Tonda" (ヤンバルクイナが飛んだ; "The Okinawa Rail Flew")	Sata Andagi	February 10, 2010
"Shiawase ni Narou/Koi" (幸せになろう/恋; "Be Happy/Love")	Akina Minami and Super Mild Seven; Pabo	March 17, 2010
"Dear Friends -Tomo e-" c/w "Gakkō e Ikou" (Dear Friends-友へ- c/w 学校へ行こう; "Dear Friends" c/w "Let's Go To School")	Friends; Michael & Hanaka	April 21, 2010
"Okinawa ni Ikimasenka" (沖縄に行きませんか; "Would You Go to Okinawa?")	Sata Andagi	May 26, 2010
"Salaryman/Dai San no Otoko/Red Eye" (サラリー☆マン/第三の男/レッド・アイ, Sararīman/Dai San no Otoko/Reddo Ai; "Salaryman/The Third Man/Red Eye")	Hiroshi Shinagawa and Suberers; Air Visual Band; Suzanne×Suzanne	June 23, 2010
"Bokura ni wa Tsubasa ga Aru ~Ōzora e~" (僕らには翼がある～大空へ～; "We Would Have Wings ~To the Sky~")	Hexagon All-Stars; Tsubasa	July 14, 2010
We Love Hexagon 2010 (WE LOVE ♥ ヘキサゴン 2010, Wī Rabu Hekisagon Nisenjū)	Compilation album	November 17, 2010
"Taisetsu na Hito" (大切な人; "Important Person")	Sata Andagi	December 8, 2010
