= Samurai Hustle Returns =

- Poster
- Kanji: 超高速！参勤交代 リターンズ
- Directed by: Katsuhide Motoki
- Starring: Kuranosuke Sasaki; Kyoko Fukada; Tsuyoshi Ihara; Yasufumi Terawaki; Yusuke Kamiji; Yuri Chinen; Tokio Emoto; Takanori Jinnai; Masahiko Nishimura
- Distributed by: Shochiku
- Release date: September 10, 2016 (Japan)
- Running time: 119 minutes
- Country: Japan
- Language: Japanese
- Box office: US$2 million

Samurai Hustle Returns (Japanese: 超高速！参勤交代 リターンズ) is a 2016 Japanese jidaigeki comedy film directed by Katsuhide Motoki. It follows 2014's Samurai Hustle. It was released in Japan by Shochiku on September 10, 2016. Kazuyoshi Saito wrote "Ikisaki wa Mirai" (行き先は未来) to be its theme song.

== Cast ==
- Kuranosuke Sasaki
- Kyoko Fukada
- Tsuyoshi Ihara
- Yasufumi Terawaki
- Yusuke Kamiji
- Yuri Chinen
- Tokio Emoto
- Seiji Rokkaku
- Arata Furuta
- Koen Kondo
- Hiroyuki Watanabe
- Akiyoshi Nakao
- Jun Hashimoto
- Kai Shishido
- Yasuko Tomita
- Ichikawa Ennosuke IV
- Renji Ishibashi
- Takanori Jinnai
- Kazuhiko Nishimura

== Reception ==
On its opening weekend, the film was fourth placed in admissions, with 171,000, and fifth placed in gross, with US$2 million.
