= Ohisama =

Japanese television drama

- Also known as: Sunshine (WakuWaku Japan)
- Genre: Drama
- Written by: Yoshikazu Okada
- Directed by: Tomochika Kasaura
- Starring: Mao Inoue; Kengo Kora; Hikari Mitsushima; Maiko; Kei Tanaka; Kento Nagayama; Tokio Emoto; Ayumi Ito; Yumi Shirakawa; Eriko Watanabe; Kazuyoshi Kushida; Yasufumi Terawaki; Tomoyo Harada; Yuki Saito; Kanako Higuchi; Misako Watanabe; Yoko Tsukasa; Tetsuko Kuroyanagi; Ayako Wakao
- Country of origin: Japan
- Original language: Japanese
- No. of episodes: 156

Production
- Producer: Masayo Komatsu
- Running time: 15 minutes

Original release
- Network: NHK
- Release: April 4 – October 1, 2011

Ohisama (おひさま) is a Japanese television drama that aired on NHK in 2011 in the Asadora time slot. Originally it was planned to air from March 28, 2011 (same as 2005's Asadora series Fight) to September 24, 2011, but it was delayed due to the earthquake and tsunami that hit Japan. It later aired from April 4, 2011 to October 1, 2011, same as 1988's Non-chan no Yume (ノンちゃんの夢) and 1994's Piano (ぴあの).

== Cast ==
- Mao Inoue as Yōko Maruyama (her maiden name was Sudō)
  - Yūki Yagi as young Yōko
  - Ayako Wakao as older Yōko Maruyama
- Kengo Kora as Kazunari Maruyama
- Hikari Mitsushima as Ikuko Tsutsui
  - Tetsuko Kuroyanagi as older Ikuko
- Maiko as Machiko Hatano (her maiden name was Sōma)
  - Yoko Tsukasa as older Machiko
- Kei Tanaka as Haruki Sudō, Yōko's eldest brother
- Kento Nagayama Sigeki Sudō, Yōko's eldest brother
- Tokio Emoto as Takeo Miyamoto
- Ayumi Ito as Natsuko Takahashi
- Yumi Shirakawa as Setsuko Miyazawa
- Eriko Watanabe as Kayo Murakami
- Kazuyoshi Kushida as Michio Maruyama
- Hiroshi Inuzuka as Takeo Miyamoto
- Yasufumi Terawaki as Ryūichi Sudō, Yōko's father
- Tomoyo Harada as Hiroko Sudō, Yōko's mother
- Yuki Saito as Fusako Haraguchi
- Kanako Higuchi as Tokoku Maruyama
- Misako Watanabe as Fujiko Kirino

== International broadcast ==
- The broadcast rights for the drama were sold to Sri Lanka with the intention of dubbing it into Sinhalese.

Preceded by Teppan	Asadora; 4 April 2011 – 1 October 2011	Succeeded by Carnation
