= Water Boys 2005 Natsu =

- ウォーターボーイズ2005夏
- Genre: Drama, Sports
- Starring: Eita; Keisuke Koide; Yuta Hiraoka; Tasuku Emoto; Manami Konishi
- Opening theme: Niji (虹)
- Country of origin: Japan
- Original language: Japanese
- No. of episodes: 2

Production
- Producers: Kōichi Funatsu; Aya Moriyasu

Original release
- Network: Fuji TV
- Release: August 19 – August 20, 2005

Related
- Water Boys 2

Water Boys 2005 Natsu (ウォーターボーイズ2005夏, Wōtā bōizu 2005 natsu; also known as Water Boys 2005 Summer) is a two-part Japanese drama series that aired in Japan on Fuji Television on August 19 and 20 2005. This is the third and final season of the series Water Boys, as its alternate title suggests, Water Boys Finale.

== Cast ==
- Masatoshi Tanaka - Eita
- Uehara Kensaku - Keisuke Koide
- Satoru Nakao - Yuta Hiraoka
- Shunichirō Koma - Tasuku Emoto
- Kyoko Uehara - Manami Konishi
- Rena Kakihara - Ayana Sakai
- Michiru Buritani - Nonami Takizawa
- Toshimichi Koma - Takashi Ukaji
- Daigo Nakao - Yutaka Matsushige
- Kosaku Uehara - Toru Masuoka
- Haru Kakihara - Misako Watanabe
- Head Teacher - Akira Kubota
- Principal - Yoshiyuki Mori
- Zenjirō Hotta - Yūsuke Nagumo (南雲勇助, Nagumo Yūsuke)
- Manabu Hatori - Toshihide Tonesaku
- Kyoko Hanamura - Yu Kashii
- Futoshi Ishizuka - Tomoya Ishii
- Takashi Yasuda - Kei Tanaka
- Megumi Sakuma - Kaori Manabe
- Katsumi Nakayama
- Kimiko Sekiguchi
- Ben Nakajima
- Hiroshi Kanbe
- Yōhei Kumabe (隈部洋平, Kumabe Yōhei)
- Hisashi Fuwa (不破央, Fuwa Hisashi)
- Sei Hiraizumi
- Yoshizumi Ishihara

=== Other Participants ===
- Jonmyon Pe (ペ・ジョンミョン, Pe Jonmyon)
- Yasuomi Sano
- Atsunori Fujii (藤井貴規, Fujii Atsunori)
- Kawagishi Ginji (川岸銀次, Kawagishi Ginji)
- Yugo Sugiura (杉浦由悟, Sugiura Yugo)
- Koji Tashiro (田代功児, Tashiro Koji)
- Kazuto Tomikawa (富川一人, Tomikawa Kazuto)
- Shintarō Nakano (中野真太郎, Nakano Shintarō)
- Mitsuomi Takahashi (高橋光臣, Takahashi Mitsuomi)
- Atsushi Taketani (竹谷敦史, Taketani Atsushi)
- 栁橋朋典
- Makai Ueda (植田真介, Ueda Makai)
- Ryuichi Kawasaki (川崎龍一, Kawasaki Ryuichi)
- Ichiro Tamaarihiro (玉有洋一郎, Tamaarihiro Ichiro)
- Hidetoshi Iwato (岩戸秀年, Iwato Hidetoshi)
- Yūki Satō (佐藤祐基, Satō Yūki)
- Kengo Kora
- Yūta Kan (菅雄太, Kan Yūta)
- Yūki Okada (岡田雄樹, Okada Yūki)
- Tomoya Takeuchi (竹内友哉, Takeuchi Tomoya)
- Naoki Nokubo (野久保直樹, Nokubo Naoki)

== Music ==
The following songs used for synchronized swimming routines during the movie:

- Hijō no License (非情のライセンス Ruthless License) by Shunsuke Kikuchi
- We Built This City by Jefferson Airplane
- Xanadu by Olivia Newton-John
- Ne~e? (ね～え？ Hey?) by Aya Matsuura
- Furui Nikki by Akiko Wada
- Go West by Pet Shop Boys
