= Mai Satoda =

- 里田 まい
- Born: March 29, 1984 (age 40); Sapporo, Hokkaido, Japan
- Other names: Mai Tanaka (after marriage); Maichin
- Occupations: Talent; model
- Spouse: Masahiro Tanaka (m. 2012)
- Children: 1
- Musical career
- Genres: J-pop
- Years active: 2000–present
- Labels: Zetima
- Website: Hello! Project.com

Mai Tanaka (里田 舞, Tanaka Mai, née Satoda (まい), born March 29, 1984) is a Japanese model, talent, and a former idol singer member of the Hello! Project group Country Musume.

== Career ==
She was also a member of Hello! Project's futsal team, Gatas Brilhantes H.P. She has released one self-titled solo photobook and also a single, "Oyaji no Kokoro ni Tomotta Сhīsana Hi" (オヤジの心に灯った小さな火) with the comedian duo, Fujioka Fujimaki.

In early 2007, Satoda was added to the unit Pabo (Korean: 바보, fool) along with Suzanne and Yukina Kinoshita, created by the Fuji TV's quiz show Quiz! Hexagon II. The group released the single "Koi no Hexagon", used as the show's closing theme. She was later added to the group Ongaku Gatas.

== Personal life ==
Satoda's husband is Japanese baseball player Masahiro Tanaka, who pitched for the New York Yankees from 2014 to 2020. They had a son in 2016.

== Discography and releases ==
=== Singles (Country Musume.) ===
==== In Country Musume. ni Rika Ishikawa (Morning Musume.) ====
1. "Iroppoi Onna 〜SEXY BABY〜" (色っぽい女 〜SEXY BABY〜(Rinne, Asami, Mai Satoda released April 17, 2002))
2. "BYE BYE Saigo no Yoru" (BYE BYE 最後の夜, (Asami, Mai Satoda released November 13, 2002))

==== In Country Musume. ni Konno to Fujimoto (Morning Musume.) ====
1. "Uwaki na Honey Pie" (浮気なハニーパイ, (Asami, Mai Satoda, Miuna released July 24, 2003))
2. "Senpai 〜LOVE AGAIN〜" (先輩 ～LOVE AGAIN～, (Asami, Mai Satoda, Miuna released November 12, 2003))
3. "Shining Itoshiki Anata" (シャイニング 愛しき貴方, (Asami, Mai Satoda, Miuna released August 4, 2004))

=== Singles (Romans) ===
==== In Romans ====
1. "SEXY NIGHT 〜Wasurerarenai Kare〜" (SEXY NIGHT 〜忘れられない彼〜(Mari Yaguchi [Morning Musume.], Rika Ishikawa [Morning Musume.], Ayaka [Coconutsu Musume.], Mai Satoda [Country Musume.], Hitomi Saitou [Melon Kinenbi] released April 20, 2003))

=== Singles (Mai Satoda with Fujimaki Fujioka) ===
==== Mai Satoda with Fujimaki Fujioka ====
1. "Oyaji no Kokoro ni Tomotta Chiisana Hi" (オヤジの心に灯った小さな火 (Mai Satoda, Fujimaki Fujioka released May 23, 2007))
2. "Zoku*Oyaji no Kokoro ni Tomotta Chiisana Hi" (続・オヤジの心に灯った小さな火 (Mai Satoda, Fujimaki Fujioka released Oct 27, 2010))

=== Singles (Ongaku Gatas) ===
==== In Ongaku Gatas ====
1. "Narihajimeta Koi no Bell" (鳴り始めた恋のBell (released Sep 12, 2007))
2. "Yattarōze!" (やったろうぜ (released Dec 5, 2007))
3. Come Together (released Sep 10, 2008)
4. READY! KICK OFF!! (released Mar 6, 2010)

=== Albums ===
==== In Country Musume. ====
1. "Country Musume. daizenshu 2" (カントリー娘。大全集②, (Asami, Mai Satoda, Miuna released August 23, 2006))

==== In Ongaku Gatas ====
1. 1st GOODSAL (released Feb 6, 2008)

== Other Discography ==
=== Singles ===
1. "Mou sugu Christmas" (もうすぐクリスマス, with Gōda Kyōdai, released November 12, 2008)
2. "Bye-Bye" (バイバイ, with Gōda Kyōdai, released January 14, 2009)
3. "Don't leave me" (with Gōda Kazoku, released June 17, 2009)

==== In Pabo ====
1. "Koi no Hexagon" (恋のヘキサゴン, released September 26, 2007)
2. "Koi" (恋, released March 17, 2010)

==== In Aladdin ====
1. "Hi wa, Mata Noboru" (陽は、また昇る, released July 30, 2008)

=== Photobooks ===
1. Satoda Mai (里田まい, released October 4, 2003)
2. My Life (released March 21, 2007)
3. Mai-Thai (released December 26, 2007)
