= Metis (Japanese musician) =

Japanese female reggae singer songwriter (born 1984)

- Born: March 28, 1984 (age 41)
- Origin: Hiroshima, Japan
- Genres: Reggae, dancehall, R&B, pop
- Occupation(s): Singer-songwriter, musician
- Instrument(s): Vocals, bass, guitar, saxophone
- Years active: 2003–present
- Labels: indie label (2003–2006); Nippon Crown (2006–2009); Island Records Japan (2009–)
- Website: http://www.metis-web.jp

Metis (born March 28, 1984, in Hiroshima) is a Japanese female reggae singer-songwriter. She debuted in her early as an R&B artist, but after her first single and album, she signed to another record label to pursue a reggae career.

== Discography ==
=== Indie albums ===
- ANSWER
- MUSIC

=== Mini-albums ===
- WOMAN
- BLESS
- Let's Join Hands (手をつなごう, Te o Tsunagō)

=== Albums ===
- ONE LOVE
- ONE HEART
- ONE SOUL

=== Singles ===
- "Blooming Plum, Cherry Blossoms are Still in Bloom" (梅は咲いたか 桜はまだかいな, Ume wa Saitaka Sakura wa Madakaina)
- "Respect!"
- "The Beauties of Nature" (花鳥風月, Kachōfūgetsu)
- "Mother's Hymn" (母賛歌, Haha Sanka)
- "By Far..." (ずっとそばに・・・, Zutto Soba ni...)
- "You Made Me Love You..." (あなたが愛をくれたから・・・, Anata ga Ai o Kureta kara...)

== Radio programs ==
- Validelight no Buchi-vali-night (report from Tokyo) – HIROSHIMA FM
