= Yoshio Kojima =

Japanese comedian

- 小島 義雄
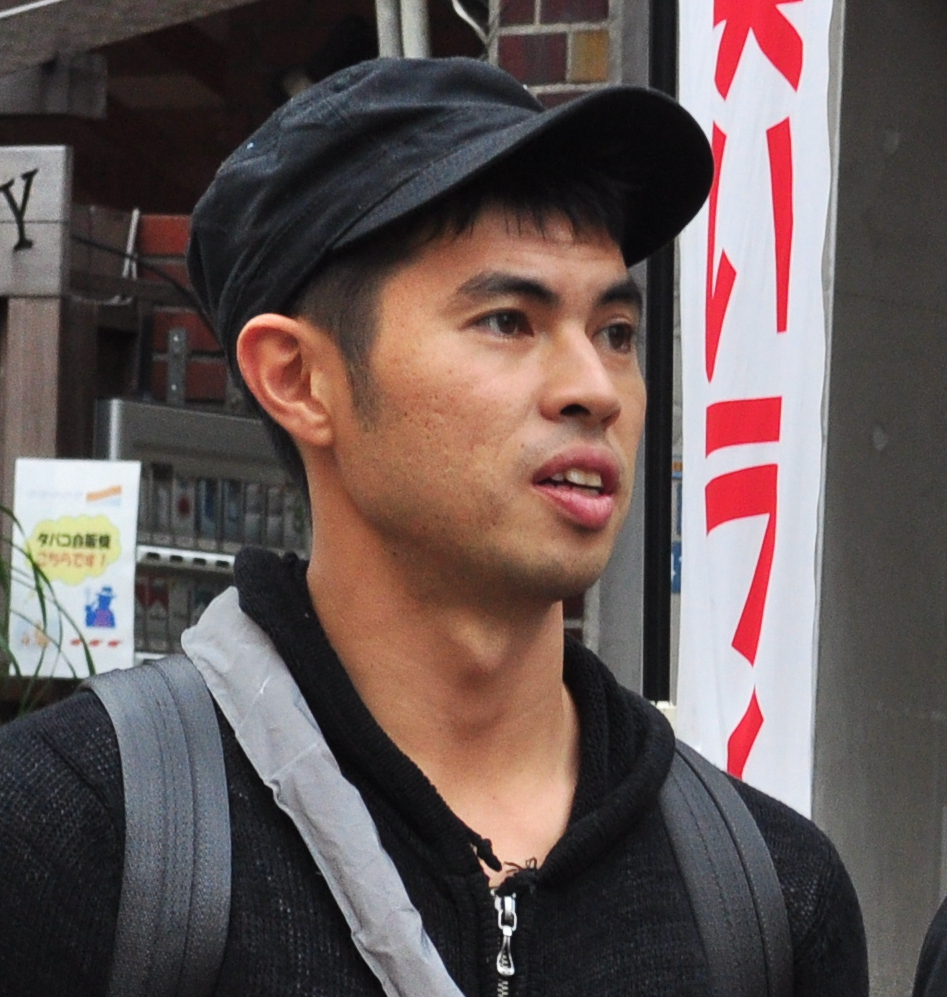
- Born: November 16, 1980 (age 45); Kumejima, Okinawa, Japan
- Occupations: Comedian, tarento
- Years active: 2001–
- Agent: Yoshimoto Creative Agency

Yoshio Kojima (小島 よしお, Kojima Yoshio; real name: 小島 義雄, born November 16, 1980) is a Japanese comedian famous for appearing only in a small bathing suit, during both performances and interviews. Among his well-known catchphrases are Sonna no kankei nee (そんなの関係ねぇ or "that has nothing to do with it", usually as a reaction to an intentional mistake in his routine) and Oppapī (おっぱっぴー), an abbreviation of "Ocean Pacific Peace", (オーシャン・パシフィック・ピース). All of his catchphrases are typically said followed by a signature dance, which has him hunched over, making a punching motion towards the ground while his hind leg is kneed upward simultaneously. A soundbite such as Oppapī, or something similarly random, is commonly used by Japanese comedians as an easy to remember and easy to repeat hook that can help popularise them and their comedy.

Kojima has also appeared on the Japanese obstacle course show Sasuke.

== Biography ==
Kojima was born in Kumejima, Shimajiri District, Okinawa and grew up in Chiba, Chiba Prefecture near Tokyo. He studied at Waseda University, earning a degree in Japanese literature.

Kojima's "Sonna no kankei nee" was nominated in the 2007 buzzwords-of-the-year contest (shingo ryukogo taisho (新語・流行語大賞)) in Japan.
