= Takeshi Tsuruno =

Japanese actor and musician

- つるの 剛士
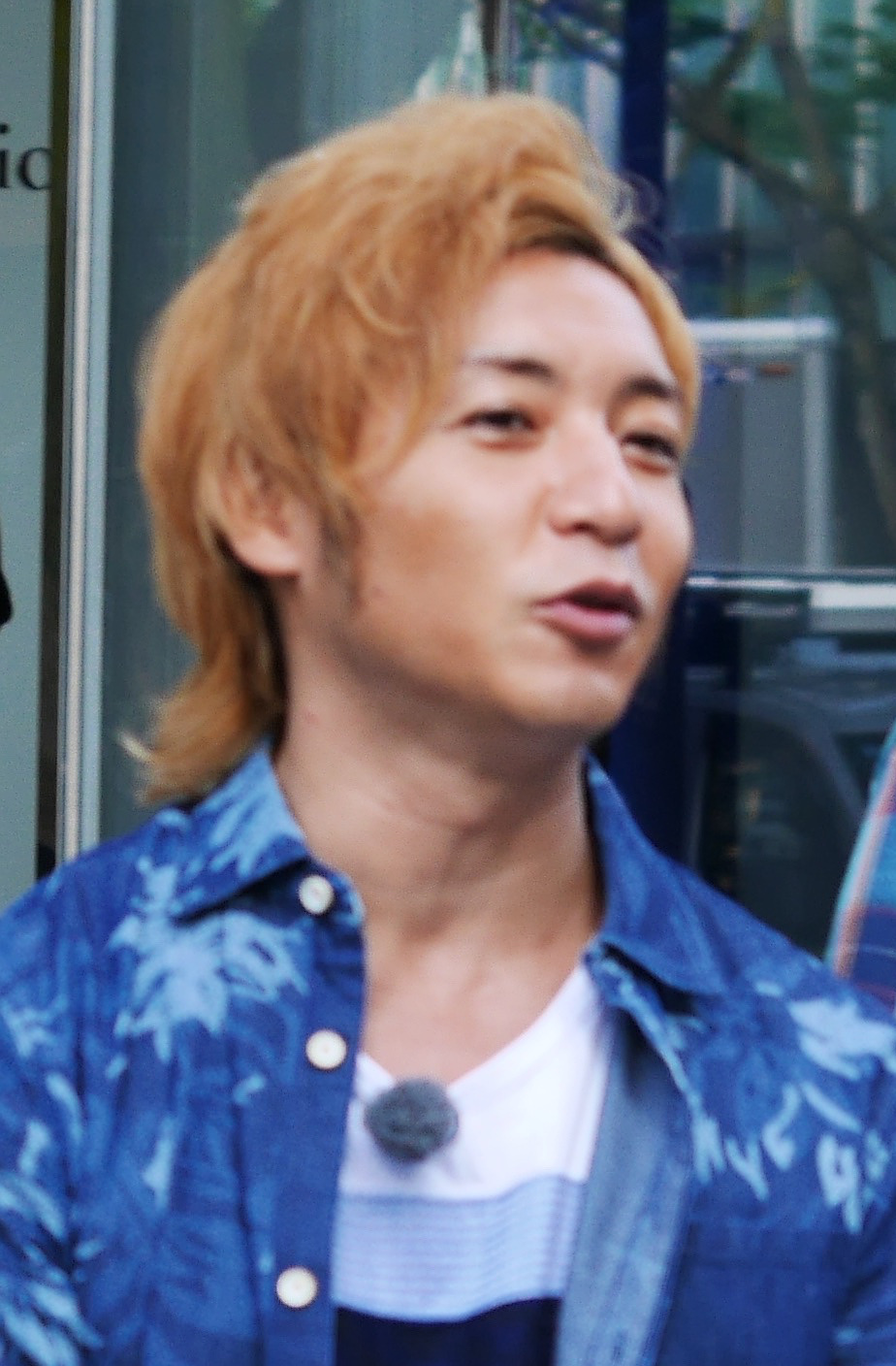
- Tsuruno in 2015
- Born: 26 May 1975 (age 51); Moji-ku, Kitakyūshū, Fukuoka
- Occupations: Actor, singer
- Years active: 1992–present
- Agent: Ohta Production
- Spouse: Miki Endo (m. 2003)
- Children: 5
- Relatives: Yuji Kaku (cousin)

Takeshi Tsuruno (つるの 剛士, Tsuruno Takeshi; born May 26, 1975) is a Japanese actor, tarento, and musician.

== Early life ==
Tsuruno is originally from Moji-ku, Kitakyūshū, Fukuoka Prefecture.

== Career ==
Tsuruno is known for his roles as Shin Asuka/Ultraman Dyna in Ultraman Dyna and as the leader of the musical units Shuchishin and Aladdin.

As a member of Shuchishin and Aladdin, he appears regularly on the variety show Quiz! Hexagon II.

Tsuruno is currently represented with Ohta Production.

== Personal life ==
Tsuruno married his former stylist Miki Endō (遠藤 美紀, Endō Miki) in 2003. They have two sons named Eito (詠斗; March 27, 2004) an unnamed son (born June 6, 2016) and three daughters named Uta (うた; January 6, 2006), Oto (おと; July 15, 2007), and Iro (いろ; November 6, 2009). He named his albums after his daughters, and after recording his first album and before the birth of his third daughter he mused naming an album after his son such that it was called Tsuruno Mugendai (つるの∞(無限大), Tsuruno Infinity by rotating the "8" around).

Tsuruno is a Roman Catholic.

== Filmography ==
=== TV dramas ===
Title	Broadcaster	Year	Role
Oretachi roommate	NTV	1996	
Ultraman Dyna	MBS	1997–1998	Ultraman Dyna/Shin Asuka
Ultraman Tiga: The Final Odyssey	Motion Picture	2000	Shin Asuka (Cameo)
Fushigi na Hanashi "mitsu no onegai"	MBS	2000	Keiji Hashimoto
Atashinchi no Danshi	Fuji TV	2009	Yutaka Kokudo
Mega Monster Battle: Ultra Galaxy Legend The Movie	Motion Picture	2009	Ultraman Dyna/Shin Asuka
Namae o Nakushita Megami	Fuji TV	2011	Takumi Akiyama
Ultraman Saga	Motion picture	2012	Ultraman Dyna/Shin Asuka
Ultraman Ginga S The Movie	Motion picture	2015	Ultraman Dyna
Ultraman Orb: The Origin Saga	Amazon Prime	2016–2017	Ultraman Dyna/Shin Asuka

== Discography ==
=== Albums ===
Title	Name	Label	Release date
BPR5000 Burst Tracks	Taiyō no Shōdō	Roadrunner Japan	March 26, 2003
We Love Hexagon	Shuchishin, Aladdin etc.	Pony Canyon	October 22, 2008
Tsuruno Uta	Takeshi Tsuruno	Pony Canyon	April 22, 2009
Tsuruno Oto	Takeshi Tsuruno	Pony Canyon	September 16, 2009
We Love Hexagon 2009	Shuchishin, Friends etc.	Pony Canyon	October 21, 2009
Tsurubum	Takeshi Tsuruno	Pony Canyon	October 20, 2010
Churu no Uta	Takeshi Tsuruno	Pony Canyon	July 13, 2011

=== Singles ===
Title	Name	Label	Release date
"Shuchishin"	Shuchishin	Pony Canyon	April 9, 2008
"Nakanaide"	Shuchishin	Pony Canyon	June 25, 2008
"Hi wa, Mata Noboru"	Aladdin	R and C	July 30, 2008
"Yowamushi Santa"	Shuchishin	Pony Canyon	December 10, 2008
"Naite mo Ii desuka"	Hexagon All-Stars/Friends	Pony Canyon	July 15, 2009
"Dear Friends -Tomo e-"/"Gakkō e Yukou"	Friends/Michael & Hanaka	Pony Canyon	April 21, 2010
"Natsu no Wasuremono" feat. Tokyo Ska Paradise Orchestra/"Love Letter"	Takeshi Tsuruno	Pony Canyon	June 9, 2010
"Cicadas"	Cicadas	Cicadas Records	August 4, 2010
"Medalist"	Takeshi Tsuruno	Pony Canyon	September 15, 2010
"Sugar Vine"/"Two Weeks to Death"	Takeshi Tsuruno	Pony Canyon	October 20, 2010
"Pokémon Ieru kana? BW"	Takeshi Tsuruno	Media Factory	June 22, 2011
"Zenryoku Zenkai! Zenkaiger"	Takeshi Tsuruno	Nippon Columbia	Early 2021
