= Hōsei Tsukitei =

Japanese comedian (born 1968)

- 月亭 方正
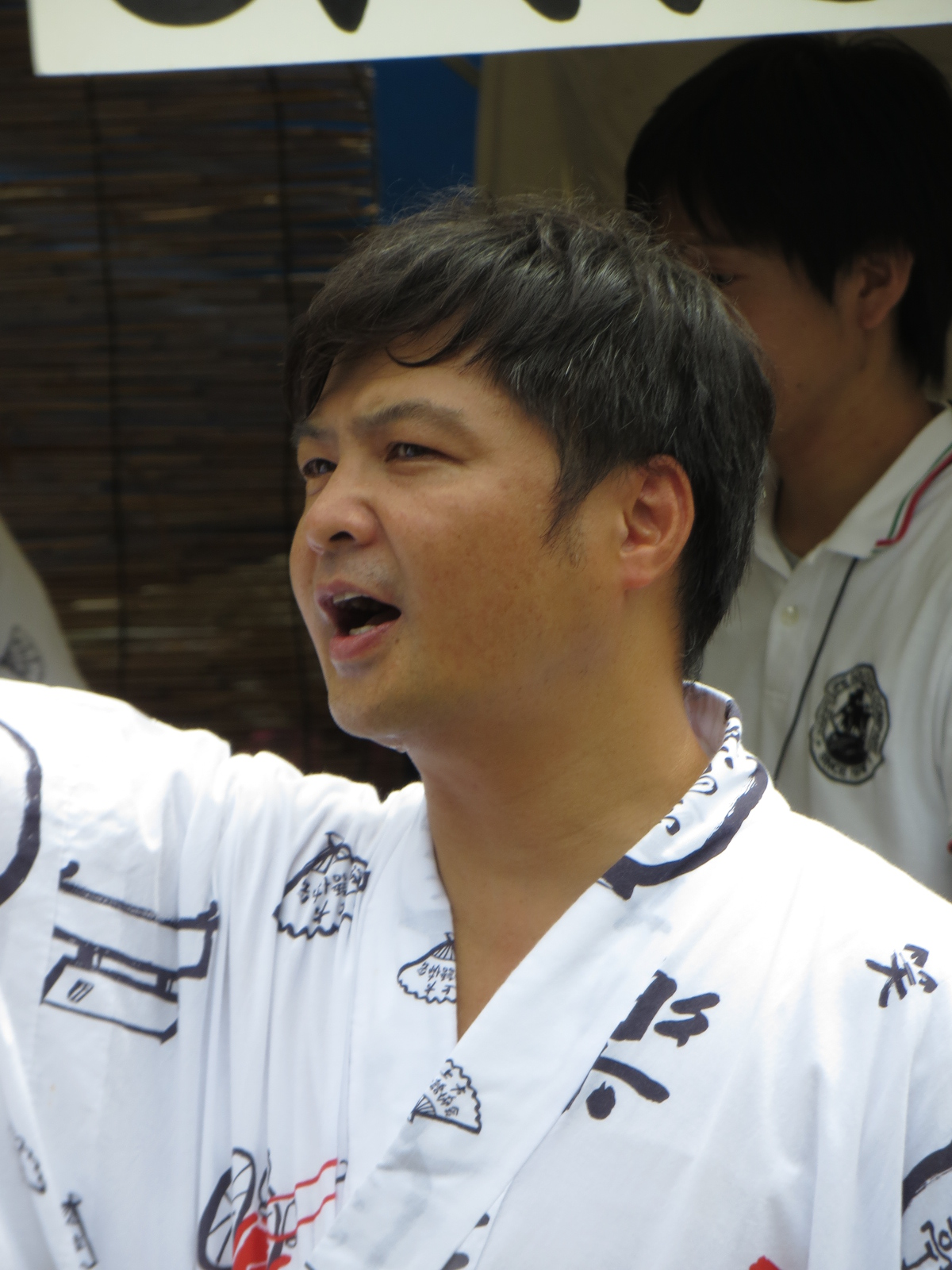
- Born: Hōsei Yamasaki; February 15, 1968 (age 58); Nishinomiya, Hyōgo, Japan

Comedy career
- Years active: 1987–present
- Medium: Owarai; Television
- Genres: Rakugo; Owarai

Notes
- Same year/generation as: Bakusho Mondai; Summers; Hanako Yamada

Hōsei Tsukitei (月亭 方正, Tsukitei Hōsei; born 15 February 1968) formerly known as Hōsei Yamasaki (山崎 邦正, Yamasaki Hōsei) is a Japanese solo comedian and rakugo performer, signed with Yoshimoto Kogyo. He is best known for being one of the five members (and the only solo comedian) of Downtown Gaki no Tsukai's regular cast. His role on the show is usually divided up between the suberi-kyara and the ijime-kyara.

Outside of Gaki no Tsukai, he has released three books, a CD single of his signature "Yamazaki Ichi-ban!" song, and has appeared in several Yoshimoto Kogyo compilations and DVD releases.

== Early life ==
Hōsei was born in Nishinomiya a city located in Hyōgo Prefecture where from the age of five he took an interest in Kendo, later joining a high school Kendo club. He attended Nishinomiya South High School where being humorous was a desirable trait; popular among fellow students, they coined the term kawaikkoii (かわいっこいい, "cute / cool") for him.

== Career ==
=== New Star Creation (1987–1988) ===
After graduating from high school, Hōsei joined Yoshimoto Kogyo's 6th NSC (New Star Creation) Osaka-based school group in April 1987. In 1988 he teamed up with Hiromitsu Noriyasu to form the owarai duo GSX (ガスペケ) who performed at the Yoshimoto-run Shinsaibashi Ni-chōme (心斎橋筋2丁目) theater alongside many other recruits and graduates, such as Downtown, Itsuji Itao, Koji Higashino and Koji Imada.

=== Team Zero (1989–1993) ===
In 1989, Hōsei and Hiromitsu Noriyasu made the move to Tokyo and renamed themselves as Team Zero (チーム0), appearing on the nationwide DAY BREAK show.

Around the same time, Downtown also moved on to Tokyo and Team Zero were frequent guests or regulars of their shows including Downtown no Gaki no Tsukai ya Arahende!!, Downtown Nari and Downtown Juice. In addition to appearing in Yoshimoto Kogyo sponsored shows such as Yoshimoto Village, they also starred in the Funky Monkey Teacher series alongside Jimmy Onishi.

Their efforts won them the Best Newcomer Award at ABC's 12th Rookie Comedian Grand Prix on January 15, 1991. However, Hōsei's comedy partner Hiromitsu Noriyasu found a passion for film directing and by the end of September 1993, Team Zero decided to part ways towards their solo careers.

=== Solo debut (1994–1997) ===
In addition to his regular appearances on Downtown's shows such as Gaki no Tsukai and Downtown Kazaana, in 1994 Hōsei also became a regular on Tenshi no U・B・U・G, a late night show hosted by Imada Koji and Higashino Koji. Initially he received much attention for his young appearance, however as his role in comedy gradually cemented towards being the hetare (へたれ, hopeless) suberi-kyara, his public image quickly changed. Work began to dry up and Hōsei considered quitting comedy until he was amused by an episode of Mutsugoro & Fun Friends, where a little Pug dog barked loudly and hopelessly confronted a large St. Bernard. Taking the underdog as inspiration he tried raising his voice and taking on comically hopeless confrontations, as seen in his ijime-kyara role, which brought in more work offers.

Hōsei appeared in a number of direct-to-video releases, including starring roles in the live-action manga adaptations of Chameleon and Pappakapā. In addition he took on roles within sitcoms, including a semi-regular part as a visiting fishmonger in Pokkapoka, and a regular part in Ken Shimura's sitcom Heisei Shimura Family where, although he was 28 ~ 30 at the time, he played the role of the 20 ~ 22-year-old son. With Denpa Shōnen International he made a number of trips abroad to take on dangerous challenges such as meeting the Mafia in Italy, participating in the Running of the Bulls in Spain and searching for the Chupacabra in Mexico.

=== Children's television (1998–2000) ===
Hōsei became a children's television presenter on the long-running Tensai Terebi-kun series, which also included performing in a number of stage plays. On set he mentored child actor Eiji Wentz who formally became his apprentice.

=== Entertainment work (2000–present) ===
As a solo comedian, Hōsei flits between various regular and irregular appearances on variety shows. From 2000 he co-hosted an MBS internet radio talk show called K'zStation Ore-tachi Yattemasu (K'zStationオレたちやってま〜す), mentioning it as one of his only regular sources of work on Gaki no Tsukai's No Laughing series in 2006.

He began appearing yearly on the Drive A Go! Go! travel program, today his travels mainly focus on onsens around Japan.

Between 2003 and 2005 he frequently appeared on Ametalk, establishing a weekly segment where Ameagari Kesshitai would intrude upon him whilst strangely dressed, leading to a comical confrontation with Hiroyuki Miyasako that would inevitably lead to Hōsei's defeat. From 2005 onward he appeared more infrequently as a talk show guest.

He often performs in Yoshimoto Kogyo stage shows, particularly at the Lumine the Yoshimoto theater where he became known for the catchphrases Ma~ (マー) and Yatta Ja~n (やったじゃ～ん). Every so often he takes on drama or film roles such as in Tears of Kitty or the more recent Mentai Piriri 2.

After graduating as a rakugo he moved to Osaka but continues to work as a solo comedian within the entertainment industry, typically on Kansai region shows such as Osaka Honwaka TV and Marco Polori, whilst maintaining his regular role on Gaki no Tsukai in the Kantō region. He is a frequent guest on variety talk shows such as Uramayo and Kaitetsu! Emi Channel. Alongside comedian friend Jinnai Tomonori and his mentor Tsukitei Happo he regularly hosts the Yoshimoto Golden Biographies series, interviewing various Yoshimoto Kogyo comedians about their lives.

=== Rakugo (2008–present) ===
In 2008 Hōsei turned 40 and with the sense that he was going through the motions coupled with the public's dwindling reception he was feeling at a loss. After seeking advice from Higashino Koji, Hōsei began to listen to performer Shijaku Katsura II, which sparked a passion for rakugo. He began practising alone for around six months before approaching rakugo performer Tsukitei Hachimitsu who introduced him to his father, rakugo master Tsukitei Happo. Happo gave him the chance to perform the comical story Amida Pond (阿弥陀池) for an audience on 11 May 2008 then invited him to a nomikai where Hōsei requested an apprenticeship. Happo accepted and thereafter mentored Hōsei for 5 years before submitting an application for him to officially join rakugo society. However, at first there was some reluctance from the governing board as a large part of his prior experience was unrelated to rakugo. Tsukitei Happo appealed the decision and he was permitted to graduate, whereupon he adopted the title Tsukitei Hōsei from 2013 onwards. He later published a book titled "Why I Became a Rakugo".

In an effort to pursue rakugo further, Hōsei moved to Osaka with his family, where the Tsukitei group is based. He now regularly performs at rakugo theaters and festivals around Japan, including charity events. At his first major solo rakugo performance, he received congratulatory flowers from Natsumi Ogawa (Masatoshi Hamada's wife), which he later handed out to attendees as thanks. As rakugo stories are traditionally learnt by listening, Hōsei uses a portable media player with around 2,500 rakugo performances to help with memorization.

== Skills ==
=== Music ===
Hōsei has a keen interest in various aspects of music and plays the piano as a hobby. In 1996, he obliged a viewer who wrote into the Downtown Kazaana show requesting him to perform a piano piece. Later, in 1999, Downtown would challenge him to perform a piano concert late at night while being terrorized by jump scares. In 2011 Hōsei successfully completed a challenge to perform Étude Op. 10, No. 3 by Chopin on a miniature toy piano.

Composing is another hobby of his, an aspect heavily utilized within the Yamasaki Produce segments of Gaki no Tsukai, where he creates both the music and lyrics for various songs which the rest of the cast must perform. Outside of this series, he also composed tracks for the debut single of AiAi in 2002.

He greatly enjoys singing karaoke and has participated in a number of televised contests, most notably winning first place in the 15th Comedian Karaoke King competition. On other programs he has also parodied many music artists such as Gackt, Exile and V6.

In addition, Hōsei has taken dance classes with an instructor and once showed footage of him practicing to Lady Gaga music.

=== Impersonations ===
Hōsei acts as an impersonator and has participated in many contests on this theme, such as Monomane Battle and Monomane Grand Prix, where he mimicked other comedians such as Ayako Imoto or parodied characters on shows like Death Note. During impersonation segments of the Gaki no Tsukai No Laughing series he'll sometimes be called upon multiple times to incite laughter.

Frequently Hōsei impersonates women such as the many popstars of the Shōwa period, or acts in the role of fictional female characters such as the bride at a wedding. In 2008 he won 6th place in a "Who is the most beautiful transvestite in showbiz" contest. When Masatoshi Hamada was chosen to cross-dress in the Gaki no Tsukai No Laughing series, he commented that, "Yamazaki should do this."

=== English ===
At one time Hōsei studied English for two years. In 1999, Imada Koji mentioned that he, Ameagari Kesshitai and a junior visited Hōsei's home for English conversation practise. He has also chosen to sing the occasional song in English, such as Smoke Gets in Your Eyes by The Platters which got a passing score in a karaoke contest. However the full extent of his present-day English proficiency is unknown.

=== Miscellaneous ===
After feeling a sense of anxiety from the highs and lows of the entertainment industry, Hōsei sought to expand his skill base and gain further qualifications to fall back on. As well as English and piano, he dabbled in various subjects such as computers and game creation to varying degrees of proficiency before settling into his rakugo studies. At the age of 32 he enrolled on an 8-year Psychology course at Rissho University but lost enthusiasm halfway through and dropped out.

== Suberi-kyara ==
Suberu literally means “to slip”, but in owarai lingo, subetta refers to a joke or gag that fails to grab any laughs or reaction. (Kyara, short for kyarakuta or character.)
Yamasaki's persona on the show (and in the owarai community in general) is of the unfunny underdog who tries very hard to be funny but fails. His failure is always accentuated by a snide remark from one of the other members of the show. Though his jokes may be amusing, members will intentionally stifle their laughter to satisfy the running gag.

== Ijime-kyara ==
Ijimeru means to bully or pick on someone. Of all the members of Gaki no Tsukai, Yamasaki takes the most physical abuse. The entire series, Yamasaki Vs. Moriman, is based around a series of bizarre wrestling matches in which Yamasaki always loses to the larger and powerful Holstein Morio from the comedy duo, Moriman. The content of the matches changes with each battle, but past matches have found the two tossing hot cooking oil at one another, trying to force each other into a tub of blue kakigori syrup, and whacking one another with thick burdock roots.

Every year since 2007 during the No Laughing New Years Specials, Yamasaki inevitably comes face to face with an irate Masahiro Chono; a pro-wrestler, and is slapped.

== Personal life ==
=== Family ===
Hōsei's tearful marriage was broadcast on Gaki no Tsukai in 2001. Aya Yamazaki would later feature in an episode highlighting her quirky answers to various questions. He has two daughters named Rara and Momo. On September 8, 2012 his son Tenma was born, Hōsei has noted how his birthday matches Hitoshi Matsumoto.

=== Hobbies ===
Hōsei enjoys mahjong and invited Hitoshi Matsumoto to play with him as part of his 20th-anniversary special. As an avid reader, he became addicted to the work of Keigo Higashino.

At one time he engaged in table tennis matches with junior entertainers at a local community center. He also notes jet-skiing as a hobby and enjoys watching American series such as Desperate Housewives.

As Hōsei travels around Japan performing rakugo, he keeps a Japanese temple stamp book (go shuin chou) to commemorate his visits.

== List of works ==
=== Regular television work ===
- Downtown no Gaki no Tsukai ya Arahende!! (NTV 1989–Present)
- Funky Monkey Teacher (ファンキーモンキー寛平先生がゆく!) (ABC 1992–1994)
- Downtown Nari (ダウンタウン也) (TBS 1993)
- Downtown Juice (ダウンタウン汁) (TBS 1993–1994)
- Tenshi no U・B・U・G (天使のU・B・U・G) (Fuji TV 1994–1995)
- Pokkapoka (ぽっかぽか) (TBS 1994–1997)
- Downtown Kazaana (かざあなダウンタウン) (ABC 1995–1996)
- Heisei Shimura Family (平成志村ファミリー) (Fuji TV 1996–1997)
- Tensai Terebi-kun (天才てれびくん) (NHK 1998–2000)
- Drive A Go! Go! (ドライブ A GO!GO!) (TV Tokyo 2002–Present)
- Marco Polori! (マルコポロリ!) (KTV 2006–Present)
- Yamazaki Hōsei's 20th Anniversary Celebration (祝山崎邦正20周年 ホンマは正月よりもめでたいでぇ！) (KTV 2008)
- Warau Yōsei (笑う妖精) (TV Asahi 2009–2010)
- Yoshimoto Golden Biographies (よしもと黄金列伝!) (YTV 2012–Present)
- Osaka Lunch Time Chat Nanishiyo!? (大阪発しゃべるランチタイム なにしよ!?) (TVO 2013–2014)
- Ameagari Yorozu Dō (雨上がりよろず堂) (YTV 2014)
- Osaka Honwaka TV (大阪ほんわかテレビ) (YTV 2015–Present)
- Kansai Information Net-ten! (かんさい情報ネットten!) (YTV)

=== Television appearances ===
- DAY BREAK (CBC 1989)
- Yoshimoto Village (ビレッジ吉本) (TBS 1990)
- 12th Rookie Comedian Grand Prix (第12回 ABCお笑い新人グランプリ) (ABC 15 January 1991)
- Denpa Shōnen International (電波少年INTERNATIONAL) (NTV 1994–1998)
- Ametalk! (アメトーーク!) (TV Asahi 2003–Present)
- Messe (メッセ弾) (TVO 2006–2009)
- Yarisugi Koji (やりすぎコージー) (TV Tokyo 2008–2010)
- VS. Arashi (VS嵐) (Fuji TV 2010–2012 Episodes #97, 144 and 182)
- Hitoshi Matsumoto no Marumaruna Hanashi (人志松本の○○な話) (Fuji TV)
- Hitoshi Matsumoto no Suberanai Hanashi (人志松本のすべらない話) (Fuji TV)
- Entertainer Rating Check (芸能人格付けチェック) (TV Asahi)
- Hamachanga! (浜ちゃんが!) (YTV)
- Downtown DX (ダウンタウンDX) (YTV)
- Maki Mizuno Magic Restaurant R (水野真紀の魔法のレストランR) (MBS)
- Birdman Contest (鳥人間コンテスト) (YTV Commentator)
- Tokumori! Yoshimoto (特盛！よしもと) (YTV)
- Kugizuke (上沼・高田のクギズケ！) (YTV)
- Uramayo (ウラマヨ) (KTV)
- Kaitetsu! Emi Channel (快傑えみちゃんねる) (KTV)

=== Film & OVA ===
- Pappakapā (パッパカパー) (1994)
- Chameleon (1996)
- Tears of Kitty (2007)
- TWILIGHT FILE X (2012)
- NMB48's Kotani Riho vs Tsukitei Hōsei Hetare Taiketsu (19 June 2013, CD Bonus for Bokura no Eureka)
- Mentai Piriri 2 (めんたいぴりり2) (TNC 2015 Part 1)

=== Radio ===
- K'zStation Ore-tachi Yattemasu (K'zStationオレたちやってま〜す) (MBS Internet Radio 2000–Present)
- Broadcasting Room of Hitoshi Matsumoto (松本人志の放送室) (Irregular Guest)

=== Theater ===
- Lumine the Yoshimoto (ルミネtheよしもと) (Various)
- Yoshimoto New Comedy Troupe (よしもと新喜劇) (Various)
- Shinjuku Midnight Baby (新宿ミッドナイトベイビー) (2009)

=== Music ===
- Yamazaki Ichiban! (ヤマザキ一番！) (27 May 1998, JAN: 4935228981052)
- AiAi - God of Youth (AiAi 青神(青春の神様)) (Composer, 6 March 2002, JAN: 4988008643633)

=== Books ===
- Usagi Nakamura & Yamazaki Hōsei Consultation (うさぎ・邦正の相談所) (September 2005, ISBN 4479391223)
- Miracle (奇跡) (April 2008, ISBN 4860102576)
- Why I Became a Rakugo (僕が落語家になった理由) (25 January 2013, ISBN 4757221592)

=== Dubbing ===
- Seed of Chucky, Chucky
