= Terumoto Gotō =

Japanese comedian and television presenter

- 後藤 輝基
- Born: June 18, 1974 (age 52); Higashiyodogawa-ku, Osaka, Japan
- Employer: Yoshimoto Kogyo

Comedy career
- Years active: 1995–
- Medium: Television
- Genre: Manzai (tsukkomi)

Terumoto Gotō (後藤 輝基, Gotō Terumoto; born June 18, 1974, in Higashiyodogawa-ku, Osaka) is a Japanese comedian and television presenter. He performs tsukkomi in the comedy duo Football Hour with his partner Nozomu Iwao. Gotō is represented by Yoshimoto Kogyo and is mainly active in Tokyo and Osaka.

== Life and career ==
Gotō dropped out of university prep school in order to pursue comedy at Yoshimoto NSC Osaka, graduating in the 14th generation class. He formed the unit Gotō-Tenma with Kunio Tenma in 1994, as they were from the same class. The duo then changed their name to Electronic Gram and was active until 1999, when they disbanded. Gotō played the boke at the time. Immediately after the disbandment, Gotō partnered up with his friend who is also from Yoshimoto NSC Osaka's 14th generation class, Nozomu Iwao, to form Football Hour, he also transitioned to becoming the tsukkomi while Iwao plays the boke.

Gotō married in August 2013. His wife gave birth to a boy in June 2015.

== Media ==
This list comprises appearances by Terumoto Gotō only, for appearances as Football Hour along with his partner Nozomu Iwao, see Football Hour.

=== Television ===
==== Current programs ====
===== Regular =====
- Konya Kurabete Mimashita (今夜くらべてみました) (Nippon TV) (2012–Present) MC - Alongside Yoshimi Tokui, Rino Sashihara, and Shelly
- Gyouretsu no Dekiru Houritsu Soudanjo (行列のできる法律相談所) (Nippon TV) (2011–Present) MC - Interchanges with Koji Higashino and Hiroyuki Miyasako
- Uchi no Gaya ga Sumimasen! (ウチのガヤがすみません!) (Nippon TV) (2015–Present) MC - Alongside Hiromi

===== Semi-regular =====
- London Hearts (ロンドンハーツ) (TV Asahi)
- Ametalk! (アメトーーク!) (TV Asahi)
- Hitoshi Matsumoto no Suberanai Hanashi (人志松本のすべらない話) (Fuji TV)
- Goddotan (ゴッドタン) (TV Tokyo)
- Mimi ga Itai TV (耳が痛いテレビ) (Nippon TV)
- Wednesday's Downtown (水曜日のダウンタウン) (TBS TV)

=== Web series ===
- Hitoshi Matsumoto presents Documental (HITOSHI MATSUMOTO presents ドキュメンタル) (Amazon Prime Video) (2017) - Season 3
- Hitoshi Matsumoto presents Documental (HITOSHI MATSUMOTO presents ドキュメンタル) (Amazon Prime Video) (2019) - Season 7
