= Downtown no Gottsu Ee Kanji =

Japanese television series

Downtown no Gottsu Ee Kanji (ダウンタウンのごっつええ感じ; roughly "Downtown's Feeling Real Good") was a Japanese variety show. It premiered on December 8, 1991 and ended its run on November 2, 1997. It aired on Fuji TV every Sunday night. Hosted by the comedy duo Downtown (consisting of Masatoshi Hamada and Hitoshi Matsumoto), it had several other actors and comedians in its regular cast, including You, Koji Imada, Koji Higashino, Itsuji Itao, Ryoko Shinohara and Honkon (Takahiro Kurano).

Like most other Japanese variety shows, it featured guest interviews and games, but it is best known and remembered for its sketch comedy. Downtown and other cast members would dress in costumes and perform absurd skits with bizarre characters.

== Recurring Sketches and Characters ==
AHO AHO MAN
Moron Moron Man. A fecal-filled-underwear-wearing superhero (played by Matsumoto) who has to save a young boy named Kentarō (played by Hamada) from the evil Ohoho Aliens. As his name suggests, he shows little intelligence or common sense and constantly pulls out useless "aho aho items" that have no effect on the villains. In the end, Kentarō loses his temper over the hero's ineptitude and defeats the aliens himself.

The Gorenjai appear in modified versions of their uniforms.

Seikimatsu Sentai Gorenjai
Translating to English as End of Century Heroes Five Range-i, it is a parody of Himitsu Sentai Gorenger; the last syllable in renjaa ("ranger") is replaced to avoid copyright issues. Each episode begins with the evil Dokuro Kamen ("Skull Mask", played by Hamada) attacking a woman (played by You) in her home. The sentai heroes, the five renjai, then burst into the scene one at a time to save her and attempt to fight Dokuro Kamen, who is too distracted and unable to fight due to their appearances.

In the first episode, they have three red renjai and two yellow (breaking the usual sentai convention of having each hero in a different colour). Dokuro Kamen lectures them and tells them to try better next time. Each subsequent episode has Dokuro Kamen attacking the same woman in the same room (often stopping for a friendly chat with the lady's friend before he attacks her), and the renjai appearing in mismatched costumes – such as Tiger Mask, Falkor, and a waitress from a No-pan Shabu shabu – or ridiculously modified versions of their uniforms. The episodes end with Dokuro Kamen scolding the renjai, pointing out exactly what is wrong, and sending them off home.

Mr. BATER
Matsumoto plays an American living in Japan, Mr. Bater (hailing from Oklahoma), who wears glasses and a white suit and speaks in the kansai dialect. In each episode, he enters a small business (such as a clothing store, barber, and jewelry store) always run by the same clerk (played by Kōji Imada), a well-meaning but dim-witted man who never speaks. Mr. Bater claims he is on his way to a party and makes a simple request, such as meat for a barbecue, or a new pair of shoes. The clerk mishears or misinterprets his requests and brings him the wrong item, e.g. a jyūtan (carpet) instead of gyūtan (beef tongue). Mr. Bater plays the clown for a brief moment and goes along with it (called norittsukomi), until he snaps back into "straight man" mode and angrily points out the clerk's mistake. This repeats until Mr. Bater finally gets fed up and storms out, as the clerk smiles at the camera. "Bater" is a foreign sounding pronunciation of the Japanese word "Beta," which means lame. Matsumoto also frequently mentions Imada's real life sexual escapades in passing, resulting in a very flustered Imada.

"North Pole" and "South Pole."

Hōkago Denjiha Kurabu
Translating to English as After School Electromagnetic Wave Club, this sketch features Kōji Imada and Kōji Higashi as "North Pole" and "South Pole," wearing nothing but helmets, gloves, and revealing thongs and holding giant U-shaped magnets. They act like characters in an after school special, teaching the viewers business world manners. The magnets, as they proclaim, are used to "draw out evil." Due to their skimpy attire, a mosaic is often applied over their groins whenever there is wardrobe malfunction.

Imada and Higashi's outrageous appearances have caused screenshots of their characters to be widely circulated on the Internet.

Tokage no Ossan
Old Man Lizard, Matsumoto plays a lonely half-lizard, half-middle aged man who lives in the park. A young boy named Masa (played by Hamada) feeds him on a regular basis. When Masa reveals he has less time for the lizard man now that he has a pet dog, the lizard man tries to convince him to let him live in his house as a second pet. The first episode of "Tokage no Ossan" was broadcast simultaneously during a major sporting event, so Downtown simply ad-libbed most of the dialogue and worked quite loosely with the long sketch out of the expectation that nobody was watching anyway, but it eventually became famous enough to warrant repeat episodes.
Shota
Itsuji Itao plays a man attending the funeral services for a young boy named Shota (Matsumoto). Unbeknownst to everyone else at the service, Shota, oblivious to his recently departed status, is bored and appears before Itao and asks if he wants to play. Itao initially refuses, trying to tell Shota that he is dead. Somehow, Shota's pranks appear to happen in real life. Itao tries to cover up Shota's pranks by playing along, such as singing on a mini-karaoke machine Shota produces, making noises when Shota sets off some firecrackers, and even engaging in a wrestling match with a monk. The pranks get increasingly erratic, perturbing the bereaved family (Hamada and You) and the monk (Higashino) performing the service. The skit ends with Itao driving everyone away from the funeral.
