= Shinagawa Shoji =

Japanese comedy duo

- Shinagawa Shōji (品川庄司)
- Employer: Yoshimoto Kogyo

Comedy career
- Years active: 1996–
- Genre: Manzai
- Members: Hiroshi Shinagawa (Boke); Tomoharu Shōji (Tsukkomi)

Notes
- Same year/generation as: Hachimitsu Jiro (Tokyo Dynamite); Bibiru Oki; Rahmens

Shinagawa Shoji (品川庄司, Shinagawa Shōji) is a Japanese comedy duo (kombi) consisting of Hiroshi Shinagawa (品川祐) and Tomoharu Shōji (庄司智春) who have featured in a number of television shows. They are employed by Yoshimoto Kogyo, and are mainly active in Tokyo. They graduated from Tokyo Yoshimoto NSC's 1st generation class and are referred to as Shinasho for short.

== Members ==
- Hiroshi Shinagawa (品川 祐), Born April 26, 1972 in Shibuya, Tokyo. Plays the boke. He is also active as a writer and director, with 5 feature films, a television drama series and music videos.
- Tomoharu Shōji (庄司 智春), Born January 1, 1976 in Ōta, Tokyo (Grew up in Kawasaki-ku, Kawasaki, Kanagawa. Plays the tsukkomi. His wife is the former Morning Musume idol, Miki Fujimoto. One of Shoji's signature gags is shouting out his wife's nickname Mikitty very loudly.

== Life and career ==
The duo met each other as the first class of students at the Yoshimoto NSC Tokyo and promptly formed the unit in 1995. As of 2019, Shinagawa Shoji is the only remaining comedy duo with both members from the 1st generation class of NSC Tokyo. Initially, the duo decided to name their unit Orange Juice, but decided upon Shingawa Shoji after being unable to come up with a creative name.

Shinagawa Shoji appeared multiple times on various comedy focused variety shows in the late 90s, but did not achieve recognition until 2000, when they appeared on the variety show Warai no Jikan (わらいのじかん) hosted by industry veterans Hitoshi Matsumoto (Downtown) and Koji Imada. Additionally, around that time, they flourished as the hypeman before studio recordings for shows such as Hey! Hey! Hey! Music Champ and London Hearts.

From 2001, the group repeatedly entered M-1 Grand Prix every year, but were unable to make the finals until 2005. By that time, they had gained traction in the industry as regulars on television. Although they placed 4th in the finals, their performance was well received and highly praised by some of the judges such as Shinsuke Shimada.

Starting in 2006, Shinagawa and Shoji had major conflicts with each other, which almost resulted in the disbandment of the duo. As Shinagawa increased his involvement in other entertainment activities such as novel publication and film directing, the relationship between them worsened to the point of a fist fight during a recording of Mecha-Mecha Iketeru!, when the duo went on to advertise for Shinagawa's film. Although the duo did not break up and their relations bettered in later years, both Shinagawa and Shoji became more involved in their personal careers rather than as a duo. With a lot more separate appearances on various television programs. Currently, the duo appears together sometimes. In 2018, the duo became MCs of their own show (Mirai-kei Idol TV on Tokyo MX) for the first time in 15 years, but the majority of their work is still solo.

== Media ==
This list consists of only media appearances made by the duo when they appear together as Shinagawa Shoji.

=== Current programs ===
- Mirai-kei Idol TV (MIRAI系アイドルTV) (Tokyo MX, 2018–) MC
- Gokuraku Tonbo Kakeru TV (極楽とんぼKAKERUTV) (AbemaTV, 2017–) - Semi-regular
- London Hearts (ロンドンハーツ) (TV Asahi) - Irregular
- Ametalk (アメトーーク) (TV Asahi) - Irregular

=== Commercials ===
- Acom (2005–2006)
- uno (Shiseido, 2007)
