= Lincoln (2005 TV series) =

Japanese television series

Lincoln (リンカーン) is a Japanese variety show. It premiered on October 18, 2005, and ended on September 10, 2013, and aired on TBS every Tuesday night. Hosted by the comedy duo Downtown, it featured seven other comedians in its regular cast, and had several recurring younger, up-and-coming comedians as guests.

The show used Abraham Lincoln as its mascot, and its slogan was: "The program of the geinin, by the geinin, for the geinin", parodying a line from his famous Gettysburg Address. The object of the show was to have the younger comedians watch and learn from the more experienced comedians through fun and games.

The opening used the song "The Revolution" by BT and featured the regular cast as superheroic anime characters in a futuristic setting. The animation was done by Studio 4°C, a studio well known for The Animatrix.

== Cast ==
=== Regulars ===
- Downtown (Masatoshi Hamada and Hitoshi Matsumoto)
- Summers (Kazuki Ōtake and Masakazu Mimura)
- Ameagari Kesshitai (Hiroyuki Miyasako and Tōru Hotohara)
- Kyaeen (Udo Suzuki and Hiroyuki Amano)

=== Semi-regulars ===
- Tomomitsu Yamaguchi
- Ogi Yahagi
- Jichō Kachō
- Shinagawa Shoji
- Speed Wagon
- Nakagawa-ke
- Bananaman
- Fujiwara
- Football Hour
