= Wednesday's Downtown =

Japanese variety show

- 水曜日のダウンタウン
- Genre: Variety
- Directed by: Kentaro Fujii; Shuichi Yanagioka
- Presented by: Downtown (Masatoshi Hamada, Hitoshi Matsumoto)
- Narrated by: Jun Hattori
- Opening theme: PUNPEE, "水曜日のダウンタウンOP"
- Country of origin: Japan
- Original language: Japanese

Production
- Producers: Yoshiyuki Sakamoto; Hideki Watanabe
- Running time: 60 minutes

Original release
- Network: TBS
- Release: April 23, 2014 – present

Wednesday's Downtown (水曜日のダウンタウン, Suiyoubi no Dauntaun) is a Japanese variety show hosted by the Japanese owarai duo, Downtown. The show has been broadcast on TBS since 2014.

== Overview ==
In each episode, a Japanese entertainer is invited to appear on the show as a host and present various trivial theories, to a group of panellists. After a brief discussion with the panel, the theories are tested during the show.

== Format ==
Presentation of Theory

An entertainer (usually a comedian) appears to present a theory they think is true. This theory is challenged by the Wednesday Downtown via a re-enactment of the situation, a ranking based on street surveys or interviews.

Viewer's Theory

Theories submitted by viewers via the Wednesday Downtown official website are collected and presented by a representing comedian, usually Tamura Kenji.

=== Recurring Segments ===
Dokkiri (Prank)

Theory that ropes unsuspecting celebrities (usually comedians) into a prank to see how they react. This kind of theory can range from being as elaborate as faking an arrest to being as simple as hiding in one's closet.

Kuro-chan

Mixed Battle

Monomane (Impersonation)

SASUKE

=== Past Segments ===
Morning Battle

Two participants (comedians, usually Kuro-chan) are blindfolded and led to a shooting location where they will sleep for the night. The staff wakes them up promptly in the morning and the two immediately engage in a battle of the staff's choice (ex. eating hotdogs, shooting a goal, jumping hurdles)

== Cast Members ==
The panel always consists of Matsumoto and four other celebrity guests. The usual formation from left to right are "male comedian", "female tarento", "male tarento", "female tarento", Matsumoto.

=== Regular Members ===
- Downtown
  - Hamada Masatoshi - Host
  - Matsumoto Hitoshi - Panel
- Jun Hattori - Narration

=== Frequently Appearing Members ===
Often appearing as either panelist or presenters.

- Chidori
  - Daigo
  - Nobu
- Kazutoyo Koyabu
- Shigeo Takahashi (Savanna)
- Toshiaki Kasuga (Audrey)
- Daikichi Hakata (Hanamaru-Daikichi Hakata)
- Anthony (Matenrou)
- Giant Shirota
- Hironobu Komiya (Sanshiro)
- Kuro-chan (Yasuda Dai Circus)
- Jungle Pocket
- Tomoharu Shoji (Shinagawa Shoji)
- Tamura Kenji
- Viking
  - Eiji Kotoge
  - Mizuki Nishimura
- Akatsu
- Takahiro Ogata (Panther)
- Nadal (Colocolo Chikichiki Peppers)

== See also ==
- Knight Scoop (Similar premise, where members of the public ask 'detectives' to investigate certain problems)
