= Japanese variety show =

Entertainment television program originating from Japan

A Japanese variety show is an entertainment television program made up of a variety of original stunts, musical performances, comedy skits, quiz contests, and other acts. Japanese variety shows are characterized by an eccentric, fast-paced style and are typically scheduled during prime television-time for entertainment. They usually feature a variety of tarento hosts, presenters and guests that include celebrities, comedians, J-pop Idols.

== History ==
Japanese variety shows originated in the 1950s, with early examples like Gesture, a charades-style game show. Game shows, initially featuring trivia competitions, expanded over time to include diverse and unconventional formats, incorporating concepts like eating unusual foods.

The second longest-running Japanese television show, which is a comedy, is Shōten which began running in 1966 on Nippon TV. After the end of the American occupation of Japan, the public NHK and commercial Nippon television began TV broadcasting in 1953. One of the longest running variety shows is on Nippon TV, Downtown no Gaki no Tsukai ya Arahende!!, which started in 1989.

== Current situation ==
Japanese television programs such as Music Station and Utaban (cancelled 2010) continue in an almost pristine format from the same variety shows of years before. One notable change in Japanese variety shows since the 1980s is the decreasing use of live backup music. Variety game shows such as Nazotoki Batoru TORE! and Team Fight often featured regular celebrity guests as well as special guest appearances to tie in with forthcoming musical, cinematic and publishing releases; this – a frequent feature of primetime Japanese variety television – has remained consistent over the years.

A once-popular host Kyosen Ōhashi said, "Weird shows that are called Variety only exists in Japan."

One of the more well-circulated clips is a segment in Gaki no Tsukai, hosted by the comedy duo Downtown. In one part, if the male contestants fail to say a tongue-twister correctly, they get hit in the crotch by a spring-loaded pole (The Chinko Machine, or, literally, the Penis Machine), causing great pain. Hitoshi Matsumoto attempted to withdraw but the host - his comedy partner and co-host Masatoshi Hamada, cajoled him back on the platform.

== Controversy over injuries ==
Japanese game shows have been known for including very cruel challenges, with Hollywood Reporter stating in 2008 "the Japanese have elevated cruelty to an art form." In 2002, in the midst of a controversy surrounding the hospitalization of Muscle Ranking contestants and the death of a middle school student who choked to death imitating a "speed eating" game from Food Battle Club, it was acknowledged that these game show challenges had caused physical injuries to some contestants. Some of these Japanese game show injuries even included spinal injuries. In 2014, Japanese game shows were still acknowledged for having cruel challenges under the guise of comedy.

In the United States of America in December 1994, Saturday Night Live mocked these unique forms of game shows with a sketch called "Quiz Kings". They were also mocked in a May 1999 episode of The Simpsons called "Thirty Minutes Over Tokyo".

== Influences overseas ==
Japanese game shows have gained international popularity in recent years. A notable example is Hole in the Wall, or Brain Wall, which has had local versions in Russia, China, Argentina, Australia, the United States and the United Kingdom. The latter two are the most successful versions, with the FOX network and Cartoon Network each having decent success with US versions of the format. The BBC would also find success with their own version in the UK.

With foreign game shows gaining interest from American viewers, in 2008, ABC created two game shows that took influence from Japanese game shows. The first of which was Wipeout, a weekly competition show that involved contestants playing in a large obstacle course. The other was I Survived a Japanese Game Show, which was a reality show that used a fictional Japanese game show to eliminate contestants one by one until the last player standing won a grand prize. Due to the similarities between their shows and other Japanese programs, ABC has been sued by TBS (Tokyo Broadcasting System) for allegedly copying Sasuke and Takeshi's Castle.

In recent years, certain Japanese variety shows have gained popularity overseas with shows such as Candy Or Not Candy, having clips circulate across various social media platforms.

== See also ==
- Variety show
- Manzai
- I Survived a Japanese Game Show
- Japanizi: Going, Going, Gong!
- Takeshi's Castle
- Brain Wall
- Gaki no Tsukai ya Arahende
- Za Gaman
- QuizKnock
