= TVer =

Japanese video streaming service

- Website type: OTT video streaming platform
- Available in: Japanese
- Founded: April 4, 2006; 20 years ago (as Presentcast, Inc.)
- Headquarters: Shimbashi, Minato, Tokyo, Japan
- Area served: Japan
- Owners: Nippon TV (16.4%); TV Asahi (16.4%); TBS Television (16.4%); TV Tokyo (16.4%); Fuji TV (16.4%)
- Key people: Nobuko Wako (President); Masamine Ryūhō (Chairman)
- Subsidiaries: TVer Technologies
- Website: tver.jp
- Advertising: Yes
- Registration: Optional
- Users: ▲9.52 million per month (as of February 2023)
- Launched: October 26, 2015; 11 years ago
- Current status: Active

TVer (Note: Katakana: ティーバー, IPA: [tiːbaː]) is a Japanese ad-supported video-on-demand (AVOD) and catch-up television service. Launched in October 2015, the platform was established as a joint venture by Japan's five major commercial television networks in Tokyo—Nippon TV, TV Asahi, TBS Television, TV Tokyo, and Fuji TV—along with four major advertising agencies. It serves as the official, centralized catch-up (missed broadcast) streaming portal for Japanese television, created primarily to adapt to mobile viewing habits and to combat the unauthorized distribution of television programs on illegal websites.

TVer allows users to stream television programs, including dramas, variety shows, anime, and documentaries, for free, typically for one week following their original broadcast. Since its inception, the platform has significantly expanded its library and broadcaster network, incorporating content from regional stations across Japan as well as the national public broadcaster, NHK. In April 2022, TVer introduced a real-time simulcast feature, enabling users to watch prime-time network programming live on their devices. The platform has also become a major hub for live sports streaming, notably consolidating commercial Olympic streaming in Japan during the 2024 Paris Summer Olympics.

As of late 2025, TVer has grown into one of the largest domestic streaming platforms in Japan, recording over 44.6 million monthly users and surpassing 650 million monthly video views.

== History ==
=== 2014–2015: Background and launch ===
In autumn 2014, the five commercial broadcasters in Tokyo (Nippon TV, TV Asahi, TBS Television, TV Tokyo, and Fuji TV) began discussing the creation of an official free video streaming service. This initiative aimed to adapt to changing media consumption habits driven by the spread of smart devices and to combat the unauthorized distribution of television programs on illegal websites. In mid-March 2015, Motto TV, a previous joint video-on-demand service operated by the broadcasters and Dentsu, was terminated after three years of operation.

On July 16, 2015, the five broadcasters officially announced the joint launch of an ad-supported free catch-up video service named TVer, and a teaser website was opened. The name TVer was coined to describe people who watch television in a new, flexible style, free from the constraints of time and location.

The service officially launched on October 26, 2015. It was operated by Presentcast Inc., a company originally established in 2006 by the five broadcasters and four major advertising agencies (Dentsu, Hakuhodo DY Media Partners, Asatsu-DK, and Tokyu Agency). TVer consolidated the individual catch-up services of the participating broadcasters into a single platform. Although TVer was designed to consolidate the individual catch-up services of the participating broadcasters into a single platform, the user experience varied by network at launch. While programs from Nippon Television, TBS Television, and TV Asahi were played directly within the TVer app, watching content from Fuji Television and TV Tokyo required a mechanism that called up and opened those networks' respective standalone applications for playback. At launch, the service offered approximately 50 to 60 programs (around 10 programs per broadcaster), primarily consisting of currently airing dramas and variety shows. These programs were typically made available for streaming for about one week following their original television broadcast. At that time, the participating broadcasters sold TVer's advertising inventory themselves. Consequently, Presentcast functioned effectively as a cost center, operating TVer based on the operating expenses provided by the broadcasters.

Following its launch, TVer faced several criticisms from media critics regarding its content volume and selection. With about 50 programs available, the platform covered less than ten percent of total television broadcasts, and some listed content consisted of five-minute segments from information shows. There was also a discrepancy in the level of commitment among the participating broadcasters; while TBS streamed its major prime-time dramas, other networks appeared to withhold flagship titles. Furthermore, the initial lineup lacked news and documentary programs, leading to assessments that the platform prioritized the business interests of the broadcasters over viewer demand.

=== 2015–2019: Early growth and platform expansion ===
The TVer mobile application surpassed one million downloads by November 19, 2015, approximately three weeks after its release, exceeding the initial target of 500,000 downloads by March 2016. By February 25, 2016, cumulative downloads reached two million, with over 70% of the platform's usage coming from smartphones and tablets. In June 2016, a resume playback feature was introduced to the platform. On October 3, 2016, Mainichi Broadcasting System (MBS) and Asahi Television Broadcasting Corporation (ABC TV) officially joined TVer. With this expansion, the number of programs available increased to approximately 100, and cumulative app downloads surpassed 3.5 million.

In February 2017, a security vulnerability (CVE-2017-2105) was disclosed in the TVer Android application. The flaw, which involved improper validation of SSL server certificates and potentially exposed users to man-in-the-middle attacks, was reported to the Information-technology Promotion Agency (IPA) and subsequently patched in an updated version of the app.

The platform continued to experience significant growth later that year. In October 2017, marking its two-year anniversary, the service recorded a then-record high of 26.26 million monthly video views. By December 2017, the TVer mobile application surpassed 10 million cumulative downloads.

Expansion of the broadcaster network continued into the following year. On March 19, 2018, Kansai TV officially joined the platform. This brought the total number of participating broadcasters to nine and expanded the content library to approximately 170 programs, which included both current broadcasts and archived shows. This expansion contributed to another record high in March 2018, with TVer's monthly video views reaching 38.71 million. During the same month, TVer's standalone monthly active users (MAU) exceeded 5.08 million, while the combined MAU across all commercial catch-up services in Japan surpassed 10 million.

In October 2018, marking the third anniversary of the service, the TVer application surpassed 15 million cumulative downloads. The platform's user engagement continued to grow, reaching new record highs during the third quarter (July to September) of that year. During this period, TVer recorded a monthly average of 45.27 million video views and 5.99 million MAU.

On April 1, 2019, TV Osaka started distributing their content on TVer, followed by Hiroshima TV on October 6, 2019.

On April 15, 2019, TVer expanded its reach beyond computers and mobile devices by launching the TV App. This update allowed users to watch the platform's content on large television screens completely free of charge. Initially, the app was made compatible with Android TV and Fire OS devices, specifically supporting Amazon Fire TV series and Sony Bravia models released from 2015 onwards. It was noted that the lineup of available programs on the TV app might occasionally differ slightly from those available on the web and mobile versions.

=== 2019–2021: NHK integration and corporate restructuring ===
A significant structural milestone occurred on August 26, 2019, when NHK, Japan's national public broadcaster, officially began distributing content on TVer. This participation was framed as a collaborative effort under Japan's dual system of public and commercial broadcasting, aiming to expand viewer touchpoints and promote a better understanding of public broadcasting. Initially, NHK offered eight programs from its General TV and Educational TV (E-Tele) channels .Because NHK is legally prohibited from broadcasting commercial advertisements, the ad slots within its programs on TVer were instead utilized to stream informational content about public broadcasting. Furthermore, NHK did not receive any advertising revenue from the platform. To strictly adhere to regulations and privacy guidelines, NHK's viewing data was managed in a separate system from the commercial broadcasters' data. This information was restricted to statistical use and general promotion, explicitly excluding targeted advertising. Additionally, the operating company clarified that using the TVer website or app did not constitute installing equipment capable of receiving NHK broadcasts. Therefore, utilizing the service did not subject viewers to NHK receiving contracts or fees, and NHK explicitly stated that viewing data would not be cross-referenced with existing contract records.

In early 2020, TVer began experimenting with the simultaneous live streaming of television broadcasts. From January 20 to 24, 2020, the five commercial broadcasters in Tokyo conducted a five-day technical trial, simultaneously streaming their weekday evening news programs. This test aimed to evaluate the technical feasibility and user interfaces when multiple networks stream live content concurrently. Later that year, Nippon TV, in collaboration with its affiliates Yomiuri TV and Chukyo TV, initiated a more extensive trial. From October 3 to the end of December 2020, they conducted a three-month live streaming test covering 32 prime-time programs broadcast between 7:00 PM and 11:00 PM. This initiative, branded as NTV Series Live Streaming, was designed to offer viewers a new way to enjoy popular television programs in real-time on smartphones, tablets, and computers, even without a traditional television set.

To further focus on its core video streaming business and accelerate its growth, the operating company underwent significant corporate restructuring. Following resolutions at the general shareholders' meeting and board of directors meeting on June 30, 2020, Presentcast Inc. officially changed its name to TVer Inc. on July 1, 2020. Concurrently, the company strengthened its financial base through a third-party allotment of new shares to the five commercial broadcasters in Tokyo (Nippon Television Networks, TV Asahi, Tokyo Broadcasting System Holdings, TV Tokyo, and Fuji Media Holdings). The restructuring also included changes in executive leadership, with Masamine Ryuho appointed as President and Representative Director.

The following year, the company expanded its capital alliance beyond the Tokyo region. On June 23, 2021, TVer Inc. announced another third-party allotment of shares, this time to the five commercial broadcasters in Osaka (MBS Media Holdings, Asahi Television Broadcasting, Kansai Television, Yomiuri TV, and TV Osaka). Following this investment, Television Osaka held a 1.0% stake, while the other four Osaka broadcasters each held 1.8%. Consequently, the ownership stakes of the five Tokyo-based broadcasters were adjusted to 16.4% each, solidifying a broader collaborative framework among Japan's major commercial networks.

=== 2021–present: Real-time simulcasting and content diversification ===
In late 2021, TV Tokyo announced plans to introduce real-time simulcasting of its programs on TVer by December. However, technical delays in developing the viewing app pushed the launch into the following year. On April 11, 2022, TVer officially rolled out its real-time simulcast service across ten major broadcasters in Tokyo and Osaka, including key stations such as TV Asahi, TBS Television, TV Tokyo, and Fuji Television. The simulcasts primarily focused on prime-time programming broadcast between 7:00 PM and 11:00 PM. Additionally, the update introduced a "start-over" playback feature, allowing users to watch live programs from the beginning even while the broadcast was still ongoing.

Driven by these service expansions, TVer's viewership surged. In April 2022, the platform reported a record-breaking 250 million monthly video views for the previous month. Furthermore, viewership on connected TVs doubled year-over-year, accounting for 25% of the platform's total views. By 2023, TVer's library had expanded to over 650 programs. Its growing prominence was reflected in a Mobile Society Research Institute survey, which reported a brand awareness rate of 72%, surpassing CyberAgent's Abema (69.4%). Similarly, a Hakuhodo DY Media Partners study found that TVer's usage rate had grown to 39.5%—a 7.5 percentage point increase from the previous year—which also overtook Abema's 34.4%.

As the platform matured, TVer began diversifying its content with live sports and original programming. In October 2022, it became the official live streaming provider for the Japan Series, a partnership it maintained through 2023 and 2024. In March 2023, TVer partnered with SportsBull to broadcast games from the Japanese High School Baseball Invitational Tournament. The platform also debuted its first original production, the educational series Saikyō no Jikanwari (最強の時間割), in December 2022, followed by its second original series, the variety show Home Goro Shiai (褒めゴロ試合), in January 2023.

During the 2024 Paris Summer Olympics, TVer provided comprehensive streaming coverage of almost all events, excluding those exclusively broadcast by NHK (though subject to preemptions for breaking news, such as earthquake reports). This marked a significant consolidation of Olympic streaming in Japan, effectively replacing the dedicated Gorin.jp portal that TVer, Inc. had operated since the 2010 Vancouver Winter Olympics.

Following the successful consolidation of Olympic streaming in the summer of 2024, TVer experienced accelerated growth, surpassing 40 million monthly active users (MAU). By January 2025, the platform reached a new record high of 41.2 million MAU. This surge in viewership translated into significant financial milestones; propelled by the increasing penetration of Connected TVs (CTV)—which accounted for 38% of total views by early 2025—and the introduction of a self-serve advertising platform, the company's proprietary ad revenue for fiscal year 2024 grew by 221% year-over-year. The total number of advertisers utilizing the platform surged to 2,138 companies.

In September 2025, TVer expanded its hardware ecosystem by launching a dedicated application for the PlayStation 5.

To sustain this momentum and appeal to younger demographics who prioritize "time performance" (efficiency in content consumption), TVer introduced a short video feature in October 2025, offering 60-second highlight clips on its top screen to drive engagement with full-length programs.

Furthermore, in December 2025, driven by an increase in viewership for sports programs alongside dramas and variety shows, TVer reached a new record high of 44.6 million monthly users (MUB), representing a 114% year-over-year increase. During the same month, total monthly video views surpassed 650 million—breaking records for the third consecutive month—while monthly views on connected TVs exceeded 200 million (reaching 210 million) for the first time, demonstrating the platform's continued massive scale expansion through the end of the year.

On March 16, TVer announced the TVer Awards 2025—an annual recognition established in 2021 for the platform's most-viewed programs of the preceding year—and presented the TBS program Wednesday's Downtown with the 10th Anniversary Grand Prize to commemorate the service's 10th anniversary. TVer has awarded the program the Variety Grand Prize for five consecutive years, and recognized it as the first program in the platform's history to surpass 300 million cumulative views (based on catch-up streams from December 2020 to November 2025).

== Content and programming ==
TVer primarily operates as a catch-up video-on-demand service, offering television programs from Japan's major commercial broadcasters and the public broadcaster NHK.

=== Catch-up service ===
At its launch in 2015, TVer offered approximately 50 to 60 programs, consisting primarily of currently airing dramas and variety shows from the five major Tokyo-based commercial networks. Programs were typically made available to stream for one week following their original television broadcast. Over time, the platform expanded its library by incorporating content from regional broadcasters, including stations in Osaka and Hiroshima, surpassing 650 regular programs by 2023. In August 2019, NHK began distributing select programs from its General TV and Educational TV (E-Tele) channels on the platform, bringing public and commercial broadcasting content onto a single service.

=== Real-time simulcasting ===
In April 2022, TVer launched real-time simulcasting for ten major commercial broadcasters in Tokyo and Osaka. The service allows viewers to watch programs live on their devices as they air on terrestrial television, primarily covering prime-time programming broadcast between 7:00 p.m. and 11:00 p.m. JST.

=== Live sports and original content ===
Beyond catch-up television, TVer serves as a hub for live sports streaming in Japan, including official live broadcasts of the Japan Series and the Japanese High School Baseball Invitational Tournament. During the 2024 Summer Olympics in Paris, TVer streamed live coverage of nearly all events, replacing the commercial broadcasters' dedicated Olympic portal, Gorin.jp, which had operated since 2010. The platform has also produced original exclusive programming, debuting its first educational series, Saikyō no Jikanwari, in December 2022, followed by the variety show Home-goroshiai in January 2023.

=== Short videos ===
In October 2025, TVer introduced a short-form video feature displaying 60-second highlight clips of television programs on the app's home screen to direct users to full-length episodes. Broadcasters produce these clips specifically for TVer, avoiding the stricter copyright clearance procedures often required when uploading promotional footage to third-party platforms such as YouTube.

== Features and platforms ==
TVer operates as a free, ad-supported video-on-demand (AVOD) platform, generating revenue through unskippable in-stream video advertisements. Due to legal restrictions under Japan's Broadcast Act, programs provided by NHK do not carry commercial advertisements; instead, their ad slots display informational announcements regarding public broadcasting.

=== Device support ===
Initially available via web browsers and mobile applications for smartphones and tablets, TVer launched a dedicated television app on April 15, 2019, compatible with Android TV and Fire OS devices, including the Amazon Fire TV series and Sony Bravia models. By 2022, viewership on connected TVs had doubled year-on-year to account for 25% of total views, rising to 38% by the first quarter of 2025 alongside an increase in co-viewing (multiple viewers watching the same screen simultaneously). On September 10, 2025, TVer released a free application for the PlayStation 5, marking its first release on a video game console. Due to licensing restrictions, the lineup of available programs on the connected TV app occasionally differs from that on the web and mobile versions.

=== Playback features and TVer ID ===
In June 2016, TVer introduced a resume-playback feature allowing users to pause a video and continue watching from the same point later. This functionality was expanded with the introduction of TVer ID, a unified account system through which users can synchronize playback progress and "My List" bookmarks—a feature for following specific programs and cast members—across smartphones, personal computers, and connected televisions.

Alongside the launch of real-time simulcasting in April 2022, TVer introduced a "start-over" playback feature, enabling registered users to rewind and watch live programs from the beginning while the television broadcast is still ongoing.

== Reception and impact ==
TVer is widely credited with establishing catch-up television viewing in Japan and curbing the use of unauthorized video streaming sites. Prior to its debut, public awareness regarding the illegality of pirated streaming sites was low, even among television industry professionals, generating high expectations for TVer as a legal on-demand alternative. However, its initial launch in 2015 was met with mixed reactions, as early users and critics noted a gap between expectations and the platform's limited initial catalog. Nevertheless, its role in bridging traditional broadcasting and internet distribution earned it the Excellence Award at the 21st AMD Awards and the Frontier Award at the 53rd Galaxy Awards in 2016.

=== Viewership and demographics ===
In its early years, approximately 80% of TVer's viewership occurred on mobile devices, fulfilling its initial goal of reconnecting smartphone users with television programming. Monthly active users (MAU) grew from 7 million in 2019 to 18.5 million in January 2022, and in March 2022, the service surpassed 250 million monthly video views. According to a 2023 survey by Hakuhodo DY Media Partners, TVer's usage rate reached 39.5%, surpassing CyberAgent's Abema (34.4%). Although user growth briefly showed signs of slowing around 2023 amid competition from global platforms such as YouTube and Netflix despite a 72% brand awareness rate, the service continued to expand, surpassing 41 million MAU by 2025.

TVer's core demographic consists primarily of women in their 20s to 40s, driven largely by serialized television dramas. Its "My List" bookmark count also emerged as a visible metric for program popularity, correlating closely with traditional television ratings and serving as a digital index of audience interest.

Widespread adoption of the platform altered how television performance is evaluated in Japan, which had historically relied almost exclusively on real-time household ratings. Several drama series that recorded modest real-time broadcast ratings topped TVer's streaming rankings, establishing TVer playback counts as a key industry indicator of program popularity and advertising value. Additionally, the COVID-19 pandemic accelerated the shift toward large-screen viewing via connected TVs, broadening the service's reach beyond individual mobile users.

=== Advertising model ===
Because viewers are accustomed to commercial breaks in broadcast television and TVer's in-stream ads are unskippable, viewer drop-off during commercials is low, resulting in a reported 98% ad completion rate.

Using demographic data—specifically age and gender—provided during mandatory user registration, the platform achieves a reported 95% targeting accuracy rate, outperforming the 30–40% average of standard web advertising. Building on this model, TVer reorganized into an operating business entity in 2020, enabling it to sell its own ad inventory directly and launch its programmatic private marketplace, TVer PMP, rather than operating solely as a cost center for broadcasters.

In fiscal 2024, TVer's proprietary ad revenue more than doubled year-on-year, reaching 221% of the previous year's figure. The introduction of a self-serve advertising platform—eliminating minimum spend requirements and enabling municipal-level geographic targeting—lowered entry barriers for small and medium-sized regional businesses. Consequently, the number of advertisers using the platform grew sevenfold over three years to 2,138 companies by early 2025, supported by expanded agency partner programs.

=== Industry impact and challenges ===
TVer has provided a national distribution channel for local and regional television programs; for example, Kamaitachi no Okite, a local variety show produced by San-in Chūō Television Broadcasting, recorded viewership numbers on TVer comparable to prime-time network broadcasts. Its industry role was further consolidated during the 2024 Summer Olympics, when it centralized commercial networks' digital Olympic streaming.

Despite this growth, the platform faces behavioral and structural challenges. Users predominantly exhibit "direct-in, direct-out" viewing habits—opening the app to watch a specific program and leaving immediately afterward—rather than continuously browsing algorithmic recommendations as on YouTube or Netflix. Even after surpassing 41 million MAU, TVer executives acknowledged in 2025 that the service had yet to match YouTube's level of habitual daily engagement during users' leisure time.

Historically, participating broadcasters also differed in their level of commitment to the platform. At launch in 2015, TVer drew criticism for offering roughly 50 programs—less than 10% of total broadcast output—supplemented heavily by five-minute mini-programs and BS satellite broadcasts. While TBS—whose executive then chaired the Japan Commercial Broadcasters Association (JBA)—actively supplied flagship dramas such as Shitamachi Rocket, networks including TV Asahi and Fuji Television withheld several of their highest-rated series. Critics also noted the initial absence of news and documentary programs, which often air in late-night slots suited to on-demand viewing, as well as the lack of short digest clips to help viewers catch up on ongoing dramas. Analysts attributed this caution partly to TVer's origins as an advertising-agency-led initiative to consolidate digital ad inventory; for broadcasters operating profitable subscription services of their own, such as Fuji Television's FOD, supplying flagship titles to a free centralized portal risked cannibalizing their proprietary platforms.

Furthermore, while TVer's digital ad revenue has grown rapidly, it still accounts for less than 4% of Japan's ¥1.76 trillion terrestrial television advertising market. As the service marked its 10th anniversary in late 2025, it also faced heightened competition in the ad-supported streaming sector as Amazon Prime Video and Netflix expanded their own programmatic advertising tiers in Japan.
