= Downtown no Gaki no Tsukai ya Arahende!! =

Japanese television series

- Gaki no Tsukai's "free talk" segment.
- Genre: Variety
- Starring: Masatoshi Hamada; Hitoshi Matsumoto; Hōsei Tsukitei; Naoki Tanaka; Shōzō Endō
- Opening theme: Coldcut, "Theme From Reportage" (1989–2017); In-house opening theme by audioforce (2017-)
- Country of origin: Japan
- Original language: Japanese
- No. of episodes: 1700+

Production
- Executive producers: Bunta Azumai (2017–); Kenji Suga (1989–2017)
- Producers: Yoshinobu Nakamura (2017–); Masaomi Miyamoto; Ichiro Goda; Jun-ichi Suzuki; Akihiro Ohnuma; Kouzou Komurasaki
- Production location: Various
- Editor: Toshihide Saito (1989–2017)
- Running time: 30 minutes
- Production company: Yoshimoto Kogyo

Original release
- Network: NNS (Nippon TV)
- Release: October 3, 1989 – present

Downtown no Gaki no Tsukai ya Arahende!! (ダウンタウンのガキの使いやあらへんで!!, Dauntaun no Gaki no Tsukai ya Arahende!!; lit. "Downtown's We Aren't Errand Boys!"), often abbreviated Gaki no Tsukai (ガキの使い) or just Gaki Tsuka (ガキ使), is a Japanese variety show hosted by popular Japanese owarai duo Downtown, with comedian Hōsei Tsukitei (formerly known as Hōsei Yamasaki) and owarai duo Cocorico co-hosting. The program has been broadcast on Nippon TV since its pilot episode on October 3, 1989, and continues to this day, celebrating its 1000th episode on April 18, 2010. The program currently broadcasts on Nippon TV and its regional affiliates from 23:25 until 23:55 JST.

== Cast ==
=== Regular cast ===
- Downtown, one of the most influential and prolific kombi in Japan, who are known for their sarcastic, short-tempered stage personas.
  - Masatoshi Hamada (浜田雅功, Hamada Masatoshi), the tsukkomi half of Downtown. His quick temper, displays of schadenfreude, and tendency to hit people on their heads are notorious in the owarai world. He is often described as an "S", or sadist.
  - Hitoshi Matsumoto (松本人志, Matsumoto Hitoshi), the boke half of Downtown. Absurdism, sarcasm, and a blunt, ill-tempered persona make up his comedic style. Deadpan is his forté, but he can slip into exaggerated reactions as well. He is often described as an "M", or masochist.
- Hōsei Tsukitei (月亭方正, Tsukitei Hōsei), part of the regular cast since 1990, when he was part of the comedy duo Team 0, which dissolved in 1993. His role on the show is usually divided between the suberi-kyara (the unfunny character who tries very hard to be funny, but fails) and the ijime-kyara (the underdog who gets bullied and picked on, often physically). Formerly known as Hōsei Yamasaki (山崎 邦正 Yamasaki Hōsei) on the show, however at times the rest of the regulars will call him Yamachan or Hosei-san.
- Cocorico, who appeared for the first time in 1994 as guests, but who only in 1997 become regular members of the program. Although they are already veteran comedians, Cocorico are considered the juniors of Gaki no Tsukai and are treated like this on the show, since they are the youngest.
  - Naoki Tanaka (田中直樹, Tanaka Naoki), the boke half and leader of Cocorico. He usually appears as a nice, cute and kind man, but in such segments as Stalking Tanaka, the "Tanaka's Breakdown" Series or TANAKER, he plays an "evil" or "rebel" version of himself. Tanaka has a clumsy, fearful and overdramatic persona and is often the target of scary pranks (when he usually falls over) and the classic "Thai Kick". He is also an actor and appears as the main character in occasional drama segments.
  - Shōzō Endō (遠藤章造, Endō Shōzō), the tsukkomi half of Cocorico. In the 2000s his character was a cool but perverted man, but over the years Endo's persona became slightly boke and the "pervert" angle became less pronounced. Nowadays Endo portrays himself as a untalented person on the show, with poor acting skills as opposed to Tanaka. Endo's most famous gags include "Ho-ho-hoi" (a humorous song and dance in some state of undress finishing with the phrase) and the fictional wrestler Dynamite Shikoku.

=== Former regular cast ===
- Hiromitsu Noriyasu (軌保博光, Noriyasu Hiromitsu), Hōsei's former partner at Team 0. He left the program in 1993 and stepped away from his comedy career, since he became more interested in filmmaking.

=== Supporting cast ===
- License (Kazuhiro Fujiwara (藤原一裕, Fujiwara Kazuhiro) and Takafumi Inomoto (井本貴史, Inomoto Takafumi)). A comedy duo that works at the show and has occasionally joined the regular cast. Fujiwara is also known as "Vacuum Fujiwara" because of his eating ability, which is used as a running gag in some skits.
- Hideaki Onishi (大西秀明, Ōnishi Hideaki). Often called by his stage name, "Jimmy Onishi" (ジミー大西, Jimī Ōnishi). He made several appearances in pre-taped segments that are shown to the cast in the "No-Laughing" batsu games, since 2005. In the videos, Onishi portrays an inane version of himself appearing in various roles, saying or doing things that are inane/off-the-wall, usually repeatedly, in an attempt to make the cast laugh. His most infamous recurring trait is his difficulty pronouncing the English language.
- Kenji Suga (菅賢治, Suga Kenji). Former chief producer. Appears in various sketches often as himself or as various characters during batsu games. As well as appearing in person during these, his likeness is often used for comedic effect in various ways—for instance, appearing on humorous posters, or as a stone bust. The name "Gāsū" (ガースー), a reversal of the kana in his given name, is also referenced in similar ways. He retired from the show in late 2017.
- Toshihide Saitō (斉藤敏豪, Saitō Toshihide). Chief director. Usually referred to by his nickname, Heipō (ヘイポー). Several sketches and games are based on his complete inability to stomach scary things (however silly they may be) and his perverted nature. He also appears whenever the cast needs an extra man around such as in "Silent Library" and "No Laughing at the News Agency" where he and Tanaka were paired up to do a Blair Witch kind of challenge in a nearby forest. He also took Hamada's place in the "Kiki Ketchup" series when the former was hospitalized.
- Hiroshi Fujiwara (藤原寛, Fujiwara Hiroshi). Downtown's former manager. Often seen portraying a female character during batsu games, where he meets up with the participants and guides them through the game. He often stutters. He also generally displays a great deal of incompetence in serious matters.
- Yoshinobu Nakamura (中村喜伸, Nakamura Yoshinobu). Producer of the show, often used when a sixth person is needed for a skit. Has appeared in batsu games and has shown his ability to withstand pain.
- Itsuji Itao (板尾創路, Itao Itsuji). A member of the comedy duo 130R and former cast member of Downtown's Gottsu Ee Kanji. Appears often in batsu games. Itao has had six different women portraying his "wife" throughout the series, one of whom, Sherri, is best known for her dancing along to Madonna (namely, "Material Girl" and "Like a Virgin") in the No Laughing High School batsu game and the No Laughing at the Police Station batsu game.

=== Recurring guests ===
- Ameagari Kesshitai (Hiroyuki Miyasako (宮迫博之, Miyasako Hiroyuki) and Tōru Hotohara (蛍原徹, Hotohara Tōru)). A comedy duo that has occasionally joined the regular cast.
- Obachan Ichigo (おばちゃん一号)浅見千代子 (Asami, Chiyoko) and Obachan Sango (おばちゃん三号)三城晃子 (Mishiro, Akiko); literally, Old Lady #1 and Old Lady #3. Two elderly women who often appear in the batsu games. Akiko died from multiple organ failure on July 27, 2011.
- David Hossein, a former manager for Thane Camus known for his phrase "今夜が山田 (Tonight is Yamada)."
- Africa Chūō TV (アフリカ中央テレビ, Afurika Chūō Terebi) Director role played by Craig Nine.
- Hidetoshi Hoshida (星田英利), better known as Hosshan (ほっしゃん。). Another comedian who makes appearances during the batsu games.
- Ayako Nishikawa (西川史子, Nishikawa Ayako). A former Miss Japan who later became a physician.
- Chiaki (千秋). Endō's ex-wife (they divorced in December 2007). She usually appears in No Laughing series, making Endo get embarrassed.
- Maejima Koichi, as Shin Onii (新おにぃ, Shin Onii)
- Takahiro Matsumoto (松本隆博, Matsumoto Takahiro).
- Hanako Yamada (山田花子, Yamada Hanako).
- Naronpat Hackam (ハーカム・ナロンパット, Hākamu naronpatto), better known as Torsu Na Nontachai (トースー・ナ・ノンタチャイ, Tōsū na nontachai). A professional Thai-Kick Boxer and Muay Thai trainer who usually appears in the No Laughing series to deliver a Thai kick to Tanaka.
- Masahiro Chono (蝶野 正洋, Chōno Masahiro). a retired professional wrestler, usually appears in No Laughing series by giving Hōsei a slap to the face.
- Shōhei Shōfukutei (笑福亭笑瓶, Shōfukutei Shōhei). A rakugo artist.
- Rola (ローラ, Rōra). A Japanese fashion model and tarento.
- Claudia Umemiya (梅宮 クラウディア, Umemiya Kuraudia).
- Anna Tsuchiya (土屋 アンナ, Tsuchiya Anna): Appeared in two year end batsu games with comic Yuki Himura.
- Shoji Murakami.
- Matsuko Deluxe (マツコ・デラックス, Matsuko Derakkusu). A TV personality known for his cross-dressing persona.
- Moriman.
- Suga Tomio, as Piccadilly Umeda.
- Egashira 2:50.

== Broadcasting TV stations ==
- Nippon TV, Aomori Broadcasting Corp., TV Iwate, Miyagi TV, Akita Broadcasting System, Inc., Yamagata Broadcasting Co., Fukushima Central TV, Yamanashi Broadcasting System, TV Niigata, TV Shinshu, Kitanihon Broadcasting Co., TV Kanazawa, Fukui Broadcasting Co., Shizuoka Daiichi TV, Chukyo TV, Yomiuri TV, Nihonkai TV, Hiroshima TV, Yamaguchi Broadcasting Co., Shikoku Broadcasting Co. Nishinippon Broadcasting Co., Nankai Broadcasting Co., Kochi Broadcasting Co., Nagasaki International TV, Kumamoto Kemmin TV, TV Ōita, Kagoshima Yomiuri TV
- Sapporo TV
- Fukuoka Broadcasting Corp.
