= Hey! Hey! Hey! Music Champ =

- Genre: Variety show
- Presented by: Hitoshi Matsumoto; Masatoshi Hamada
- Country of origin: Japan
- Original language: Japanese
- No. of episodes: 745

Production
- Running time: 54 minutes
- Production company: Fuji Television

Original release
- Network: FNS (Fuji TV)
- Release: October 17, 1994 – December 17, 2012

Hey! Hey! Hey! Music Champ was a Japanese music variety show on Fuji Television hosted by the comedy duo Downtown, which consists of Hitoshi Matsumoto and Masatoshi Hamada. It is a very popular show with comical hosts who like to pick on their guests. An episode usually consists of live performances (of recently released songs) from popular artists, chat segments and other fun and games.

Many famous singers such as Ayumi Hamasaki, Britney Spears, Hikaru Utada, and Namie Amuro have performed almost all of their singles on this show. Japanese rock artists such as Glay, X Japan, Alice Nine, The Gazette, Nightmare, Gackt, DJ Ozma, and L'Arc-en-Ciel have also been on the show performing their hit singles as well as playing games with the hosts. All bands signed under Johnny & Associates have also appeared on the show as guests and have performed their latest hit songs. South Korean boybands SS501, Big Bang, TVXQ and girl groups S.E.S., Girls' Generation, and Kara have also appeared on the show.

On September 18, 2012, Fuji TV announced that "Hey! Hey! Hey! Music Champ" would end its run after eighteen years. The series finale aired on December 17, 2012.

== Segments ==
=== Music mixture ===
In this quiz game segment, four or five teams of one or more individuals try to guess songs as they are played four at a time. (As each song is correctly guessed, they are eliminated from the mixture.) Each song has a descending point value, from 40 for the first song guessed to 10 for the last.

The game is played in four rounds, with the final round determining the winner in one of two ways through a random draw. The "NG" variation has one of the four songs in the final rounds taking away 100 points from the individual/team who guessed it. The "Lucky" variation is exactly the reverse: one of the final round songs gives 100 points to the individual/team who guessed it.

=== Telephone box ===
In this interview segment, guests are interviewed over a telephone in an English-style phone box.

=== Rainichi-In ===
This interview segment focuses on non-Japanese artists that have a loyal following in Japan, such as Ne-Yo and Britney Spears.

=== Hoshi no resutoran (The Star restaurant) ===
This segment is a combination interview/cooking show: a chef from a restaurant selected by the guest(s) as his/her/their favorite restaurant cooks for that guest and Downtown.

One notable example of this is when X Japan co-founder Yoshiki noted the Shibuya-based restaurant La Rochelle as his favorite place. The restaurant's owner/head chef, Hiroyuki Sakai, came on the show to cook a special dish for Yoshiki.

=== Other competitions ===
Miscellaneous competition segments have also occurred over the show's run, many of which started rivalries between Downtown and guests. One such example is a 1999 billiards competition between entertainer Masaharu Fukuyama and Hitoshi Matsumoto, which led to an Iron Chef battle between the two.

== Songs That Ranked #1 on the Half-Year and Year-End Perfect Rankings ==
Year	Song Title	Artist	Source
1995	TOMORROW	Mayo Okamoto	
Second Half of 1996	Asia no Junshin	PUFFY	
1996 (Japanese)	LA・LA・LA LOVE SONG	Toshinobu Kubota with Naomi Campbell	
1996 (Western)	Macarena (Love Macarena)	Los del Rio	
First Half of 1997 (Japanese)	FACE	globe	
First Half of 1997 (Western)	CHANGE THE WORLD	Eric Clapton	
1997	CAN YOU CELEBRATE?	Namie Amuro	
First Half of 1998	Yozora no Mukou	SMAP	
1998	Yozora no Mukou	SMAP	
1999	Automatic	Hikaru Utada	
2000	TSUNAMI	Southern All Stars	
2001	fragile	Every Little Thing	
2002	Wadatsumi no Ki	Chitose Hajime	
First Half of 2003	Sekai ni Hitotsu Dake no Hana	SMAP	
2003	Sekai ni Hitotsu Dake no Hana	SMAP	
First Half of 2004	Jupiter	Ayaka Hirahara	
2004	Hitomi wo Tojite	Ken Hirai	

- The first-ever #1 song on the Perfect Ranking (aired October 17, 1994) was "Koishisa to Setsunasa to Kokorozuyosa to" by Ryoko Shinohara with t.komuro.
- On the April 8, 1996 broadcast, a cumulative Perfect Ranking from the first episode was announced. The #1 song was "TOMORROW" by Mayo Okamoto.
- On the April 21, 1997 broadcast, an artist-based cumulative ranking from the first episode was announced. The #1 artist was Mr.Children.
- On the October 6, 1997 broadcast, a 3-year cumulative Perfect Ranking was announced. The #1 song was "TOMORROW" by Mayo Okamoto.
- On the May 3, 2004 broadcast, a 10-year cumulative Perfect Ranking was announced. The #1 song was "TSUNAMI" by Southern All Stars. This song holds the record for the longest consecutive #1 streak on the Perfect Ranking, with 12 straight weeks. Among the songs ranked within the top 100, the oldest was "Sazae-san" by Yuko Uno, released as a single on November 10, 1969. In the case of "Sazae-san", it earned very few points from CD sales, but consistently gained points from the "tie-in program viewership ratings" category—ranking near the top almost every week. This cumulative effect led to its placement in the ranking, a phenomenon unique to the Perfect Ranking system.
- On April 1, 2019, "HEY!HEY!NEO" aired the "Perfect Ranking 2019 First Quarter (according to Billboard JAPAN)." The number one song at the time was Kenshi Yonezu's "Lemon."

== See also ==
- FNS Music Festival
