= Big Man Japan =

- Japanese poster art
- Directed by: Hitoshi Matsumoto
- Written by: Hitoshi Matsumoto; Mitsuyoshi Takasu
- Produced by: Akihiro Okamoto
- Starring: Hitoshi Matsumoto; Riki Takeuchi; Ua; Ryūnosuke Kamiki
- Cinematography: Hideo Yamamoto
- Edited by: Soichi Ueno
- Music by: Tōwa Tei
- Distributed by: Phantom Film; Shochiku
- Release dates: 19 May 2007 (Cannes); 2 June 2007 (Japan)
- Running time: 113 minutes
- Country: Japan
- Language: Japanese
- Box office: $9,763,244

Big Man Japan (Japanese: 大日本人, Hepburn: Dai Nipponjin; lit. 'Large Japanese Person') is a 2007 Japanese kaiju film written, starring and directed by Hitoshi Matsumoto. It was well received by critics in the U.S., after many months of showings at various festivals and film events.

== Plot ==
The film takes the form of a mockumentary that follows Masaru Daisatou. Daisatou is an otherwise normal Japanese citizen except for an inherited ability to grow to a height of approximately 30 meters in response to the application of high voltage electricity. As both his father and grandfather before him, Daisatou has accepted the duty to protect Japan against various giant monsters while working for a sub-division of the defence ministry called the Ministry of Monster Prevention. The Battles with the monster are televised, and the ratings appear to drop or pick up depending on the event, most of the monsters have obscure abilities, and he generally defeats them. Despite his great powers, he increasingly finds himself mocked by his fellow citizens while struggling under the burden of living up to a heroic lineage that increasingly overshadows his own mediocre accomplishments as a monster fighter. To further complicate matters, he is deeply estranged from his own wife and child, who aren't living with him. Eventually, he encounters a particularly formidable monster, said not to be from Japan but from Korea. He runs away from it, which just results in more ridicule. Eventually, he receives assistance from a family of Ultraman-styled monster fighters to challenge it.

== Cast ==
Actor	Role
Hitoshi Matsumoto	Masaru Daisatō/Big Man Japan
Riki Takeuchi	Leaping Monster
Ua	Manager Kobori
Ryūnosuke Kamiki	Child Monster
Haruka Unabara	Strangling Monster
Tomoji Hasegawa	Interviewer
Itsuji Itao	Female Stink Monster
Hiroyuki Miyasako	Super Justice's Mother
Takayuki Haranishi	Male Stink Monster
Daisuke Miyagawa	Super Justice
Takuya Hashimoto	Midon
Taichi Yazaki	Masaru's Grandfather/the Fourth
Shion Machida	Masaru's Ex-Wife
Atsuko Nakamura	Bar Proprietress Azusa
Daisuke Nagakura	Masaru's Grandfather (young)
Motohiro Toriki	Masaru's Father/the Fifth
Keidai Yano	Young Masaru
Junshirō Hayama	Shintō Priest

== U.S. release ==
Magnolia Pictures gave the film a limited release in April 2008. It was released on DVD July 28, 2009.

== Reception ==
Rotten Tomatoes, a review aggregator, reports that 78% of 32 surveyed critics gave the film a positive review; the average rating is 6.4/10. The site's consensus is: "Hitoshi Matsumoto's indescribably odd mockumentary is undeniably inspired." Metacritic rated it 62/100 based on 13 reviews. Roger Ebert said the film was "very funny in an insidious way" and gave it three and a half stars out of four.

== American remake ==
In June 2011, The Hollywood Reporter wrote that there was a remake in the works. Phil Hay, Ugur Demir and Matt Manfredi were reported to be writing the script and Neal H. Moritz the producer.
