= Ametalk! =

- Genre: Talk show, variety, comedy
- Directed by: Rinzo Kaji
- Presented by: Ameagari Kesshitai; Hiroyuki Miyasako (former); Tōru Hotoharu; Supporting MC every week (after Miyasako's departure)
- Starring: Ameagari Kesshitai; Hiroyuki Miyasako; Tōru Hotoharu
- Narrated by: Kenji Satō
- Opening theme: Telephone Operator by Pete Shelley
- Ending theme: My Sharona by The Knack
- Country of origin: Japan
- Original language: Japanese

Production
- Producers: Kenji Kojima, Midori Abiko, Rinzo Kaji
- Running time: 60 minutes
- Production company: TV Asahi

Original release
- Network: ANN (TV Asahi)
- Release: April 8, 2003 – present

Ametalk! (アメトーーク!, Ametō̄ku!) is a Japanese comedy focused variety and talk television show hosted by Toru Hotohara of Ameagari Kesshitai on TV Asahi. Each episode of Ame Talk has a focused topic and invites guests, usually comedians, who are relevant to the topic to discuss or share their stories in a light-hearted and often comedic atmosphere.

== History ==
The show first began in 2002 as a special and became a weekly variety show in 2003 as Ameagari Kesshitai's first major national program. It is currently still airing with high viewership ratings since the show began its broadcast.

In June 2019, one of the MCs of the show, Hiroyuki Miyasako, was suspended by Yoshimoto Kogyo for affiliation with an anti-social organization back in 2014 alongside 10 other comedians. Since then, all episodes with recordings containing Miyasako after the date of the news have been broadcast after editing Miyasako out completely. He is also removed as the MC in future episodes as Hotoharu will remain the MC with other supporting MCs every week.

== Format ==
The show's regular format has the two hosts from Ameagari Kesshitai, Hiroyuki Miyasako and Tōru Hotohara (previously including Miyasako) alongside one or two other panelists, usually comedians or tarento on the left side of the stage and around 5 to 10 guests that will be the main speakers on the topic at hand sitting in two rows on the right side of the stage. Each of the guests will then proceed to share their stories and episodes relating to the topic of the episode, usually one at a time, inciting responses and banter from the hosts, the panelists and the other guests.

The topic of each episode is sometimes determined by taking suggestions and recommendations from the viewers on Ame Talk's official website.

== Casts ==
Other than Ameagari Kesshitai, the panelists and guests that appear on the show are usually comedians, tarento, athletes, actors, idols, models, TV announcers and more. Each episode features a topic that the guests are relevant to or share a commonality to, and can be general or specific.

== In popular culture ==
Mashin Sentai Kiramager did their version of the show known as Kira Talk! with the Kiramai Stones, which aired on May 31 and June 7 as a replacement to its regular episodes due to the COVID-19 pandemic in Japan. The two-week special covered their past adventures with their Kiramager partners as well as their battles against the Jamenshi.
