= Ameagari Kesshitai =

Japanese comedy duo

- Ameagari kesshitai (雨上がり決死隊)
- Employer: Yoshimoto Kogyo

Comedy career
- Years active: 1989 - 2019
- Members: Tōru Hotohara (Tsukkomi); Hiroyuki Miyasako (Boke)

Notes
- Same year/generation as: Gokuraku Tombo; Jun Nagura (Neptune); Kunihiro Matsumura; Summers

Ameagari Kesshitai (雨上がり決死隊), also known simply as Ameagari, was a Japanese comedy duo (kombi) consisting of Hiroyuki Miyasako (宮迫 博之) and Tōru Hotohara (蛍原 徹). They are from Osaka and, like most other comedians from the Kansai region, are employed by Yoshimoto Kogyo. The duo was created in 1989 and disbanded on August 17, 2021.

Their kombi name translates to Post-Rain Suicide Squad. Their namesake was a concert tour by RC Succession (a favorite rock band of theirs) that occurred while they were both students at Yoshimoto Kogyo: New Star Creation. It was based on one of their singles, "Ameagari no Yozora ni" ("To the Post-Rain Nightsky").

They are friends with Downtown and are common guests on their show, Downtown no Gaki no Tsukai ya Arahende!!, usually when extra members are needed for a game. Both kombi are regulars on LINCOLN.

== Members ==
- Hiroyuki Miyasako (宮迫 博之, Miyasako Hiroyuki; born March 31, 1970 in Nishiyodogawa-ku, Osaka) - Plays the boke. Married with one child. Notoriously narcissistic. In his trademark greeting, he points both index fingers towards the viewer (in a "bang bang" pose) and happily proclaims "I'm Miyasako!" ("Miyasako desu!"),
- Tōru Hotohara (蛍原 徹, Hotohara Tōru; born January 8, 1968 in Kadoma, Osaka) - Plays the tsukkomi, but is able to be both a boke and tsukkomi. Married in 2004 to his long-time girlfriend. Known for his bowl cut hair and his quick temper.

== Hosted Shows ==
- Tsūkai Akashiya TV (痛快!明石家電視台) (MBS, since 1999)
- Nobunaga (ノブナガ) (CBC, since 2001)
- Ameagari Kesshitai no Talk Bangumi Ametalk! (雨上がり決死隊のトーク番組アメトーーク!) (TV Asahi, since 2003)
- LINCOLN (リンカーン) (TBS, since 2005)
- Sukibara (スキバラ) (TV Tokyo, 2006-2009)
  - Toriagari Kesshitai Totterman DS (撮り上がり決死隊 トッターマンDS) (2006-2007)
  - Ameagari Kesshitai no Chikyū Chōsasen Amedizon (雨上がり決死隊の地球調査船アメディゾン) (2007-2009)
- Ameagari Club (雨上がり食楽部) (Kansai TV, since 2010)
- GNN -Geinin News Network- (芸人報道) (Nippon TV, since 2010)
- Kakumei TV (最先端IT情報SHOW 革命×テレビ) (TBS, since 2010)
