= Natsumi Ogawa =

Japanese actress and entertainer (born 1962)

- 小川 菜摘
- Born: Minako Shimamura; December 30, 1962 (age 63); Chōfu, Tokyo, Japan
- Other names: Minako Hamada (real name); Minako Shima (島 聖名子, Shima Minako; old stage name)
- Education: Tokyo Metropolitan Sakuramizu Commercial High School
- Occupations: Entertainer, actress
- Years active: 1978 -
- Agent: Yoshimoto Creative Agency
- Height: 1.6 m (5 ft 3 in)
- Spouse: Masatoshi Hamada
- Children: Hama Okamoto (eldest son)
- Relatives: Megumi Tama (aunt)

Minako Hamada (濵田 聖名子, Hamada Minako; née Shimamura (島村), born December 30, 1962, in Chōfu, Tokyo, Japan), better known as Natsumi Ogawa (小川 菜摘, Ogawa Natsumi), is a Japanese actress and entertainer who is represented by Yoshimoto Creative Agency. Her aunt is actress Megumi Tama.

== Filmography ==
=== Films ===
Year	Title	Role	Notes
1984	Renzoku Satsujinki Reiketsu	Etsuko Mori	
1984	B. Scramble		
1988	Yamada-mura Waltz		
1988	Stay Gold	Kayo Hirosawa	
1989	Sensei	Midori	
1993	A Class to Remember		
2010	Watashi no Yasashikunai Senpai	Michiyo Iriomote	
2014	Bay Blues: 25-sai to 364-nichi	Akiko Takayama	

=== TV series ===
Year	Title	Role	Network	Notes
	Otoko! Abare Hatchaku		TV Asahi	Episode 32
1983	Tokugawa Ieyasu	Sokushitsu	NHK	
1984	Hitozuma Sōsa-kan		ABC	Episode 12
1985	Kinyō Onna no Drama Special		Fuji TV	
1985	Getsuyō Drama Land		Fuji TV	
1986	Tōshiba Nichiyō Gekijō		MBS	Episode 1,550
1987	Downtown Monogatari		MBS	Episodes 16 to 24
1990	Getsuyō Drama Special		TBS	
1990	Dramatic 22		TBS	
2007	My Fair Boy!		TBS	
2008	Kinyō Prestige		Fuji TV	
2010	Kōiki Keisatsu	Midori Nakanishi	TV Asahi	
2011	Asu no Hikari o Tsukame	Koharu Nishikawa	THK	
2012	Deka Kurokawa Suzuki	Nobuko Miyake	YTV	Episode 8
2015	Wakaretara Sukinahito	Ichiko Uchida	THK	
