= Koji Higashino =

Japanese comedian and television presenter

- 東野幸治
- Born: 8 August 1967 (age 58); Takarazuka, Hyōgo, Japan
- Other names: Higashinori; Chirichiri (ちりちり)
- Education: Hyōgo Prefectural Takarazuka High School
- Occupations: Comedian; television presenter
- Years active: 1985–
- Agent: Yoshimoto Creative Agency
- Television: Current; Gyōretsu no dekiru Hōritsusōdansho; Higashino-Okamura no Tabi: Saru Private de gomen nasai...; Wide na Show; Shujii ga Mitsukaru Shinryōsho; 1 Shūkai tte Shiranai Hanashi; Specials; Bakushō Sokkuri monomane Kōhaku Uta Gassen Special; Yarisugi Toshi Densetsu; Monomane Ōzakettei-sen; Birdman Rally; Former; Downtown no Gottsu Ee Kanji; 4-Jidesu yō da; Downtown Shiru; Arabikidan
- Partner: Koji Imada (as W Koji)

Notes
- Same year/generation as: Koji Imada

Koji Higashino (東野 幸治, Higashino Kōji; born 8 August 1967, in Takarazuka, Hyōgo) is a Japanese comedian and television presenter. He is represented with Yoshimoto Creative Agency (Yoshimoto Kogyo). He graduated from Hyōgo Prefectural Takarazuka High School. He is nicknamed Higashinori (ひがしのり; as his hair gets wet it looks like seaweed). (Note: Other nicknames, Chiri Ke (チリ毛; for his natural perm), Shiroi Akuma (白い悪魔; for fairly mocking people's misfortunes), Chirichiri (チリチリ), Kata yaki soba (かたやきそば), Inmō Tabe Tabe (陰毛食べ食べ; named after Kunihiro Kawashima of Yasei Bakudan), 2-gun no Boss (2軍のボス, 2-gun no Bosu; nicknamed by Hiroiki Ariyoshi), Rin Higashino (東野りん, Higashino Rin; nicknamed by Tetsurō Degawa), etc.)

== Filmography ==
=== Television ===
Year	Title	Notes	Ref.
1994–1997	Downtown no Gottsu Ee Kanji		

=== Film ===
Year	Title	Role	Notes	Ref.
2026	Chimney Town: Frozen in Time	(voice)		

== See also ==
- Yoshimoto Kogyo
- Performer
- Television presenter
- Motoharu Sano – Relating to "Koji Higashino Ishigakijima Triathlon"
- Koji Imada
