= Koji Imada =

Japanese actor

- 今田 耕司
- Born: March 13, 1966 (age 60); Osaka, Japan
- Education: Seifu Junior-Senior High School; NSC Osaka 4th Generation
- Employer: Yoshimoto Kogyo

Comedy career
- Years active: 1985–present
- Medium: Television
- Genres: Owarai, mantan, conte

Notes
- Same year/generation as: Koji Higashino; Itsuji Itao

Koji Imada (今田 耕司, Imada Kōji; born March 13, 1966 in Osaka city) is a Japanese musician, comedian, tarento and TV presenter. His talent agency is Yoshimoto Kogyo.

In the mid-1990s, Imada paired with the acclaimed Japanese record producer Towa Tei under the stage name Koji 1200. He released two albums and multiple hit singles, including Now Romantic and Blow Ya Mind.

Imada is currently one of the most prominent figures in the Japanese television industry as an active TV presenter and comedian. Although they were not an official comedy duo, Imada along with Koji Higashino were known as the W Koji as they shared the same name and were both graduates of the Yoshimoto NSC Osaka Comedy School as the 4th generation. Among the shows he's presented for was Amazon Prime's Caligula.

== Media ==
=== Television ===
==== Present ====
===== Regular Programs =====
- Jinsei ga Kawaru Ippunkan no Fukaī Hanashi (人生が変わる1分間の深イイ) (Nippon TV, 2012–)
- Kaiun! Nandemo Kanteidan (開運!なんでも鑑定団) (TV Tokyo, 2011–) MC
- Ima-chan no Jitsu wa (今ちゃんの「実は…」) (ABCTV, 2008–) MC
- Family History (ファミリーヒストリー) (NHK General TV, 2016–) MC
- Another Sky (アナザースカイ) (Nippon TV, 2008–) MC
- Tokumori! Yoshimoto Imada-Hachimitsu no Oshaberi Jungle (特盛!よしもと 今田・八光のおしゃべりジャングル) (Yomiuri TV, 2012–) MC
- Honoo-no Taiiku-kai TV (炎の体育会TV) (TBS, 2011–) MC
- Honnō Z (本能Z) (CBC TV, 2015–) MC
- Yoshimotozaka46 ga Ureru Made no Zenkiroku (吉本坂46が売れるまでの全記録) (TV Tokyo, 2019–) MC
- Imada ni Fan Desu!! (いまだにファンです!!) (TV Asahi, 2019–) MC

===== Semi-regular Programs =====
- Improvement Committee (さんまのおわらいこうじょういいんかい) (Fuji TV, 2015–)
