= Itsuji Itao =

Japanese comedian and actor (born 1963)

Itsuji Itao 板尾 創路
- Born: Itsuji Itao; July 18, 1963 (age 63); Tondabayashi, Osaka, Japan

Comedy career
- Years active: 1985 – Present
- Medium: Owarai; TV
- Genre: Owarai

Notes
- Same year/generation as: Koji Imada

Itsuji Itao (板尾 創路, Itao Itsuji; born July 18, 1963) is a Japanese comedian and actor. He is a member of the comedy duo 130R and former cast member of one of Downtown's previous shows. He usually appears in their batsu games.

== Filmography (actor) ==
=== Film ===
- 2001 Desert Moon ... Interviewer
- 2002 The Blessing Bell ... Prisoner
- 2003 9 Souls as Fujio
- 2003 Josee, the Tiger and the Fish ... The Manager
- 2004 Space Police
- 2005 Cromartie High: The Movie ... Masked Takenouchi, also screenwriter
- 2005 Yaji and Kita: The Midnight Pilgrims ... Naniwa Hotto
- 2005 Hanging Garden ... Takashi Kyobashi
- 2005 The Great Yokai War
- 2005 Kamen Rider: The First
- 2006 One Missed Call: Final ... Professor Yoshitaka Kibe
- 2006 Ghost Train
- 2006 Death Note: The Last Name ... Hikima
- 2007 Pile Driver
- 2007 Tokyo Tower: Mom and Me, and Sometimes Dad
- 2007 Dai Nipponjin ... Female Niounojyuu
- 2007 Grow
- 2007 Erotic Rampo: Ningen-isu
- 2007 Negative Happy Chainsaw Edge
- 2007 Big Man Japan ... Female Stink Monster
- 2008 Tokyo Gore Police
- 2008 Tamami: The Baby's Curse
- 2008 Love Exposure
- 2009 Your Story
- 2009 Air Doll
- 2010 Scabbard Samurai
- 2011 Karate-Robo Zaborgar
- 2012 Be My Slave
- 2014 Heisei Riders vs. Shōwa Riders: Kamen Rider Taisen feat. Super Sentai
- 2016 Kako: My Sullen Past
- 2018 Ashita ni Kakeru Hashi
- 2018 The Miracle of Crybaby Shottan
- 2021 First Love
- 2022 The Mukoda Barber Shop
- 2022 Signature
- 2023 Revolver Lily
- 2025 Transcending Dimensions
- 2026 The Invisibles

=== Television ===
- 2006 Imo Tako Nankin – Kozo Ikeuchi
- 2011 Carnation
- 2013 The Family Game – Kazushige Numata
- 2019 Idaten
- 2019 The Naked Director
- 2020 Ochoyan
- 2020 Detective Yuri Rintaro – Asahara
- 2022 Hiru – Yashima
- 2022 Short Program
- 2023 Ao Haru Ride

== Filmography (director) ==
- 2010 The King of Jail Breakers
- 2011 Mask of Moonlight
- 2017 Hibana: Spark
