= Downtown (comedy duo) =

Japanese comedy duo

- ダウンタウン
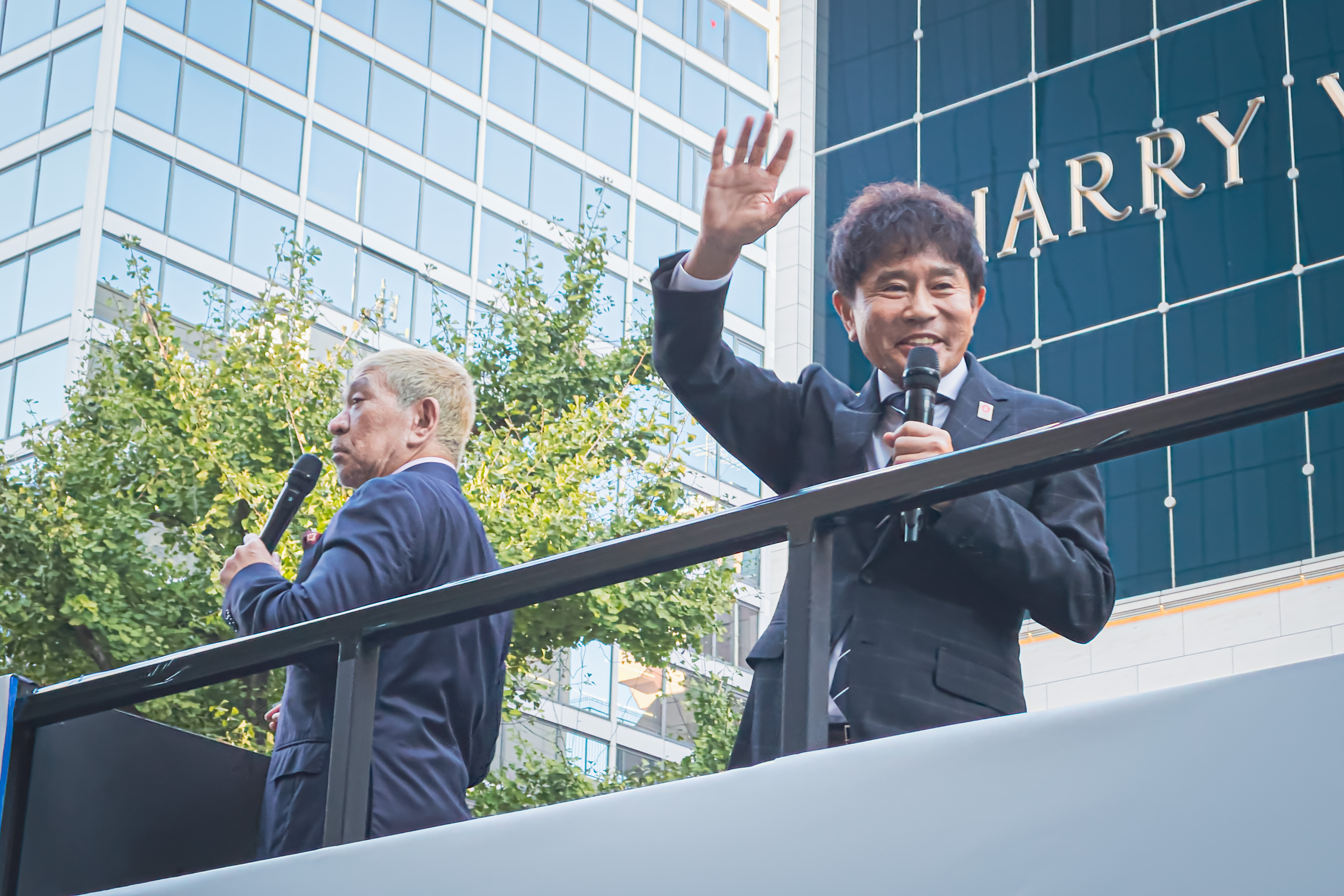
- Matsumoto (left) and Hamada (right) in 2020
- Other names: Hama-chan and Mat-chan (浜ちゃんと松ちゃん)
- Employer: Yoshimoto Kogyo

Comedy career
- Years active: 1982–present (formed in Hyogo Prefecture)
- Genres: Manzai, conte
- Members: Masatoshi Hamada (Tsukkomi); Hitoshi Matsumoto (Boke)

Notes
- Same year/generation as: Tommys; High Heele

Downtown (Japanese: ダウンタウン, Hepburn: Dauntaun) is a Japanese comedy duo from Amagasaki, Hyōgo consisting of Hitoshi Matsumoto and Masatoshi Hamada. Formed in 1982, they are one of the most influential and prolific comedy duos in Japan today. They are best known for their stand-up acts, hosting numerous Japanese variety shows (such as Downtown no Gaki no Tsukai ya Arahende!!, Hey! Hey! Hey! Music Champ and Wednesday's Downtown) and their sarcastic, short-tempered stage personas.

As a result of their massive popularity and the relative domination of their employer, Yoshimoto Kogyo, the Kansai dialect (in which both performers usually speak) has come to be associated with Japanese comedy (owarai) as a whole. In 2011, teachers at the NSC comedy school reportedly noted that 70 percent of students name Matsumoto and Hamada as being among their key inspirations.

== Members ==
Masatoshi Hamada
Born May 11, 1963 in Naniwa-ku, Osaka and raised in Amagasaki, Hyōgo. Plays the tsukkomi. Married to actress Natsumi Ogawa with two sons. Also known as "Hama-chan" (浜ちゃん). His quick temper, displays of schadenfreude, and tendency to whap people on their heads are notorious in the Japanese comedy world. He is often described as "sadistic". He was referred to as Hama-chon by Matsumoto earlier in his career.

Hitoshi Matsumoto
Born September 8, 1963 in Amagasaki, Hyōgo. Plays the boke. Also known as "Mat-chan" (松ちゃん). Absurdism, sarcasm, and a blunt, ill-tempered persona make up his comedic style. Deadpan is his forte, but he can slip into exaggerated reactions as well. He is the "M" or masochistic of the duo, and was referred to as Mattsun by Hamada while they were younger.

== Background ==
=== Childhood and school years ===
Matsumoto and Hamada attended and met at Ushio Elementary School in Amagasaki, Hyōgo of the Kansai region. They did not become friends until their second year in Amagasaki Taisei Junior High School, where they both joined the school's broadcasting club and called each other Mattsun (まっつん) and Hama-chon (はまちょん). It is then Matsumoto joked about becoming a comedy duo together and planted the idea into their heads. At the time, Matsumoto was part of a manzai trio called "Koma Daisanshibu" with two of his classmates, Itō and Morioka.

Their first television appearance in 1982 at the age of 18 and not yet known as Downtown

One day, Matsumoto's manzai partner, Itō, had an argument with Hamada which escalated into a street fight. Hamada won, and prompted Matsumoto to leave with him. Matsumoto was unsure of what to do, but started walking in the same direction as Hamada because it was the opposite direction from Itō's house. This incident marked the beginning of Downtown.

They were split apart when they entered different high schools. The boarding school Hamada entered was very strict, and Hamada attempted to escape several times. Whenever he escaped successfully, he called Matsumoto for help, hiding at his home for several days before being caught by his teachers. Hamada repeated the cycle of escaping, calling Matsumoto to borrow money to buy food, and being caught again, throughout his high school years. Matsumoto, on the other hand, entered a local tech school, and became the leader of the school band, but quickly started skipping school to hang out with his girlfriend from middle school.

=== Early career ===
A VHS from 1988

After graduating, Hamada had an unsuccessful try at becoming a motorboat racer. Hamada invited Matsumoto to join him to become a comedian. At the time, Matsumoto had a job offer from local publishing company, but he decided to join Hamada. Although Matsumoto's comedy talent agency of choice was Shōchicku Geinō, the two went with Hamada's choice and entered Yoshimoto Kogyo: NSC (New Star Creation) in Osaka. Their first stage name was "Matsumoto Hamada". Other names they had were "Hitoshi Masashi", "Teruo-Haruo", and The "Wright Brothers", before settling as "Downtown", a name they picked from a magazine. They made their major debut in 1983.

Matsumoto and Hamada received positive comments from older comedians in NSC, but went without a single chuckle from the audience, sometimes receiving insults from hecklers. They organized performances of their sketches and routines by themselves, but could not get people to listen, even if tickets were free. Matsumoto describes these early years as hell, showing his immense frustration and stress during this period. They even considered quitting at one point. Neither made enough money to live on their own, so they had to live with their parents, commuting to the city by train for performance opportunities. Ironically, Matsumoto had to search for a part-time job in a magazine printed by the printing company that he had originally been supposed to enter after graduating high school.

=== Rise to popularity ===
Despite the hardships, they gradually increased their fan-base and status. In April 1987 (four years after their debut) they began hosting a local television show called Yoji Desu Yōda ("It's Four O'Clock"), which immediately raised them to idol-like popularity in the region (music singles, videos and photo books in which they posed like fashion models were released), especially among high school girls. After a tearful farewell concert, they ended the show and moved to Tokyo in 1989, making various appearances on low rating TV programs before making their big break with their long-running variety show Downtown no Gaki no Tsukai ya Arahende!!. From that point, they went on to create several other successful variety shows, such as Downtown no Gottsu Ee Kanji, Downtown DX and the music-centric Hey! Hey! Hey! Music Champ.

=== Streaming service ===
As of November 1, 2025, the duo opened a streaming service called "Downtown+" (Downtown Plus). The news was shared by their agency, Yoshimoto Kogyo, on October 2. Programming is divided in three categories: "Downtown," "Matsumoto Hitoshi," and "Hamada Masatoshi." In addition to new content in the "Matsumoto Hitoshi" category, which will be produced and starred in by Matsumoto, there will be past TV shows and movies.

== Comedy style ==
Hamada about to hit Matsumoto on the head on Downtown DX

=== Boke and tsukkomi ===
As with many Japanese comedy duos, there exists a boke and a tsukkomi. Matsumoto is the boke of the two and often puts up with light physical abuse (it is common for the tsukkomi to slap the boke on top of his head whenever he says something rude or ridiculous) from Hamada, the tsukkomi. Hamada is also known to attack other tarento and celebrities when they give boke-like responses to Downtown's questions. In a very recent skit where Downtown and the other Gaki members were presented with the autonomous robot Pepper Hamada even slapped the robot on its head. Hamada's aggressive ways have earned him the nickname of Do ESU no Hamada (ドＳの浜田), or "Hamada the Super Sadist."

But occasionally, they switch their roles as a skit about Hamada being immortal, had Hamada in the Boke and Matsumoto in the Tsukkomi role. With Hamada telling stories about how he survived several accidents which would have put any other in the hospital and with Matsumoto addressing the audience in a very dry tone "Aho ya." (What an idiot)

=== Manzai ===
The early 1980s prominently featured quick, snappy styles of manzai, but Downtown took the opposite approach, using a slow, mumbling tone which baffled older comedians. While other duos performed manzai facing the audience, Downtown would face each other as if they were simply conversing, ignoring the presence of the audience. Their contribution to manzai is immeasurable; it has been remarked that manzai will never be the same after Downtown, and many aspiring comedians have copied parts of Downtown's style. It is notable that Downtown never had a mentor (it was common for younger comedians to be "trained" by older, more experienced comedians) which was essential to the development of their own, unorthodox style.

In the group's early years, many recognized Downtown's talent, but doubted Downtown would ever succeed due to their sluggish style, which was so drastically different from that of mainstream manzai. Shinsuke Shimada, a leading manzai comedian, had been one of the doubters until he saw one of Downtown's performances. Shimada was startled by how funny and complex Downtown was, and immediately announced his retirement from manzai. In his press conference, Shimada cited Downtown as the major reason for his retirement, but the press ignored the comment, since the duo had very little popularity at the time, writing instead that Shimada had felt outclassed by a different manzai duo; Saburo-Shiro. Shimada's decision proved to be correct however, as Downtown dominated manzai in the late 1980s and early 1990s. Downtown and Shimada have developed a close bond over the years, and Matsumoto co-hosts a TV talk show ("Matsushin") with Shimada.

Performing ad-libbed manzai on Gaki no Tsukai

Though Matsumoto and Hamada are now regarded as "geniuses" of their respective roles, it is unjust to laud them only for their talent. Matsumoto made a change from being a quieter character to his current, ill-tempered style, while Hamada had to repeatedly apologize for brash comments in variety shows. Upon hearing that many fans regarded Hamada as the crux of the group, Matsumoto embarked upon an array of solo skits to prove himself, while Hamada relentlessly studied other groups' tsukkomi to improve upon his own skills.

Another important aspect of Downtown's comedy is their willingness to make themselves the butt of the joke. While many popular manzai comedians become elevated to the level where poking fun at them is out of the question, Downtown has always taken ridiculous roles in shows, even after becoming popular. This is particularly evident in Gaki No Tsukai where they endure countless physical and mental punishments, such as their punishment games. Generally, these roles are reserved for younger, less popular comedians, but Matsumoto and Hamada relish these roles even after becoming part of the elite of Japanese entertainment.

Downtown has not performed a manzai routine since 1991, though the free talk session on Gaki No Tsukai can be considered the final form of Downtown's manzai.

=== Kansai dialect ===
Yoshimoto Kōgyō is very much a Kansai operation, although it is not limited to people from Osaka and its surroundings. Most of its comedians speak Kansai-ben, the strong, earthy dialect that developed among the merchant classes of Osaka, as opposed to the more elegant tones of Kyoto or the standard language of the Edo (now Tokyo) aristocracy.

Matsumoto and Hamada have never lost the dialect and have used it to their benefit. They use it in the titles of their TV shows—translations of Gaki no Tsukai ya Arahende ("Not An Errand Boy!"—"Gaki no Tsukai dewa Naiyo!" in standard Japanese) or Gottsu Ee Kanji cannot be found in a standard dictionary. Downtown's popularity have turned these expressions into common vocabulary.

== Private relationship ==
Although they appear to be best friends on their shows, Hamada and Matsumoto admit they are not as close as one may think. On their many hosted shows and interviews, the two have made the following revelations:

- In a 1990 interview, Hamada and Matsumoto revealed that they had gone through very tense moments, and that their second year as a comedy duo saw their relationship at its worst. They revealed that during that period, just before they were scheduled to perform at the Umeda Hall in Osaka on New Year's Eve, the two had an argument which devolved into a violent fight, but when their turn to perform arrived, they went up to the stage and performed their act as if nothing had happened.
- They do not know each other's cell phone numbers, as they see no need to phone one another. Matsumoto has phoned Hamada's cell phone just once: when Hamada fractured his right leg (after kicking a locker out of rage) and was taken to a hospital. He had to ask a staff member for his number.
- They do not travel together, even going as far as arranging for one to travel by plane and another by train to avoid meeting by chance.
- They find it extremely awkward and uncomfortable being left alone together in a room, as showcased during the "500 questions for Hamada Masatoshi" segment. Matsumoto won the challenge and sat there in awkward silence as Hamada offered him a drink.
- After Hamada's marriage, Matsumoto has never been to his residence.
- Matsumoto has only seen Hamada's son once, when he was still an infant.
- By pure coincidence, they once vacationed in Guam at the same time. When Matsumoto saw Hamada, he avoided him. When later asked by Hamada why he did not say anything, he replied that it would have been "too awkward".
- Matsumoto has said that even if they quit Downtown, they likely would not be able to return to being friends.

On Music Champ, Matsumoto stated they see each other so often at work, the thought of meeting in private never crosses their mind. During an interview with PUFFY, he was impressed by how the two singers spend time together as friends despite having to work together all the time as a duo—he turned to Hamada and told him, "I'd rather eat off the floor than go out to dinner with you."

This does not mean, however, they do not get along outside of work. Though they do not consider each other to be friends, their deep business relationship and respect for each other is evident. Hamada has said if they ever parted ways, he would "never do comedy again," as there is no one else he would like to make his partner, Matsumoto has expressed similar views. He has also said he saves his best tsukkomi material for Matsumoto. Tanaka of Cocorico reports seeing Matsumoto become visibly concerned whenever Hamada is sick and unable to come to work.

Matsumoto has said that if the duo ever split up, they would like to perform their manzai one last time at Namba Grand Kagetsu, Yoshimoto Kogyo's theatre in Osaka and the very stage on which Downtown launched their career.

== Television ==
=== Hosted shows ===
Downtown currently host the following programs every week:

- Sundays Downtown no Gaki no Tsukai ya Arahende!! (ダウンタウンのガキの使いやあらへんで!!) (Nippon TV, since 1989)
- Wednesdays Wednesday's Downtown (水曜日のダウンタウン) (Tokyo Broadcasting System, since 2014)
- Thursdays Downtown DX (ダウンタウンDX) (Yomiuri TV, since 1993)
- Fridays Downtown Now (ダウンタウンなう) (Fuji TV, 2015-2016, since 2017)

=== Partial list of past hosted shows ===
- Yoji Desu Yōda (4時ですよーだ) (MBS, 1987-1989)
- Downtown no Moto (ダウンタウンの素) (MBS, 1990-1992)
- Downtown no Gottsu Ee Kanji (ダウンタウンのごっつええ感じ) (Fuji TV, 1991-1997)
- Nama Nama Nama Nama Downtown (生生生生ダウンタウン) (TBS, 1992-1993)
- Downtown Nari (ダウンタウン也) (TBS, 1993)
- Downtown Jiru (ダウンタウン汁) (TBS, 1993-1994)
- Hatsumei Shōgun Downtown (発明将軍ダウンタウン) (Nippon TV, 1993-1996)
- Hey! Hey! Hey! Music Champ (Fuji TV, 1994-2012)
- Kaza-ana Downtown (かざあなダウンタウン) (All-Nippon News Network, 1995-1996)
- Downtown Seven (ダウンタウン・セブン) (MBS, 2001-2003)
- WORLD DOWNTOWN (Fuji TV, 2004)
- Kangaeru Hito (考えるヒト) (Fuji TV, 2004-2005)
- LINCOLN (リンカーン) (TBS, 2005-2013)
- Bakushō! Dai-Nippon Akan Keisatsu (爆笑！大日本アカン警察) (Fuji TV, 2011-2013)

=== Television dramas ===
- Downtown Monogatari (ダウンタウン物語) (MBS, 1987)
- Katsura Sanshi no ŌATARI! Shoshun Nagaya (桂三枝の大当り!初春長屋) (Kansai TV, 1988)
- The Yoshimoto Kōgyō Satsujin Jiken (THE 吉本興業殺人事件) (ABC, 1988)
- Ucchan Nanchan no Convenience Monogatari (ウッチャンナンチャンのコンビニエンス物語) (TV Tokyo, 1990, guest appearance)
- Yonimo Kimyō na Monogatari Gyakuten (世にも奇妙な物語「逆転」) (Fuji TV, 1992)
- Densetsu no Kyōshi (伝説の教師) (Nippon TV, 2000) Matsumoto only; Hamada appeared in the final episode
- Ashita ga Arusa (明日があるさ) (Nippon TV, 2001) Hamada was a protagonist while Matsumoto made minor cameos

=== Other shows ===
In October 2013, Downtown was scheduled to host the academic research and variety show Hyakubyō Hakase Academy (100秒博士アカデミー), in the Tuesday ten o'clock slot on TBS.
