= Masatoshi Hamada =

Japanese comedian (born 1963)

- 浜田 雅功
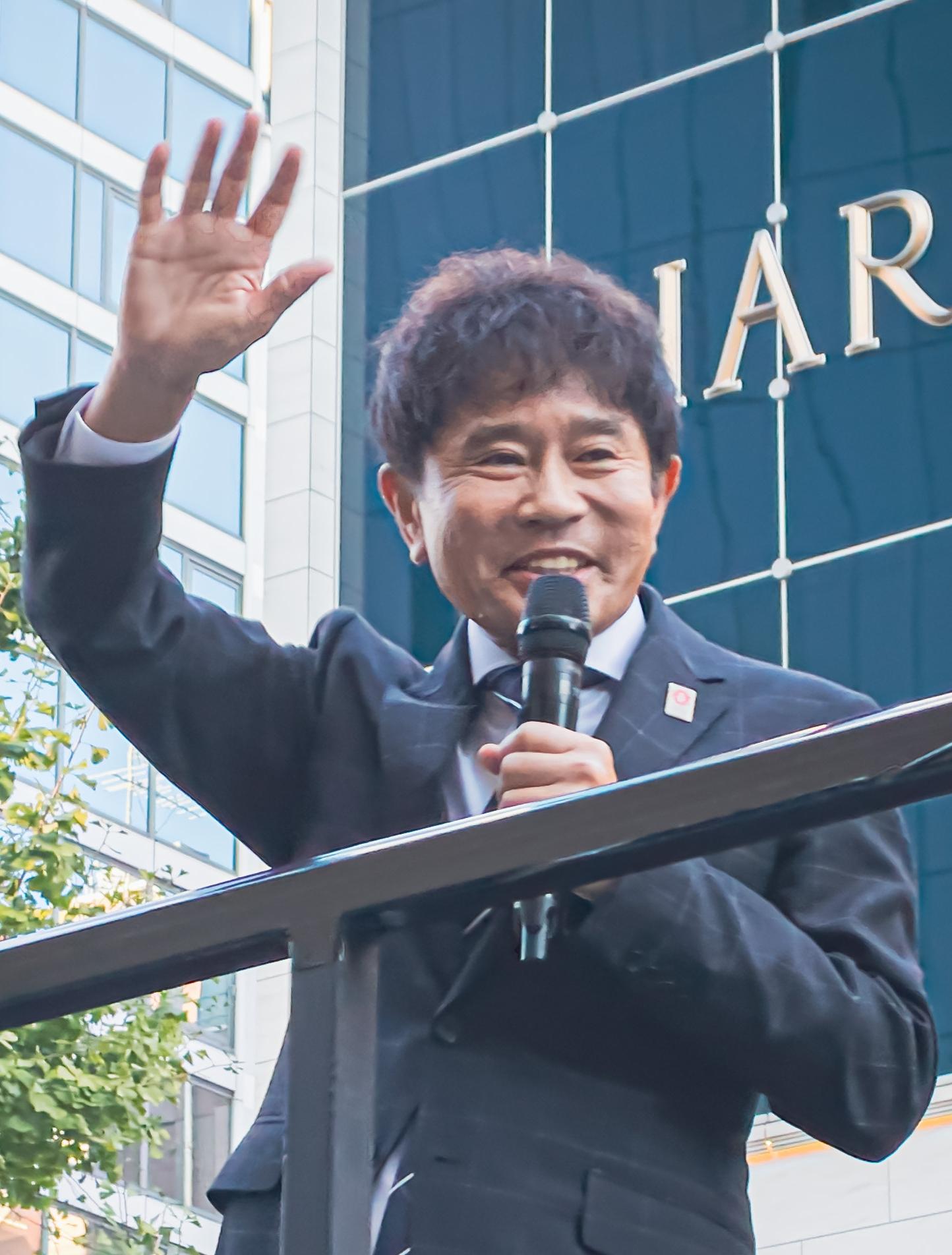
- Hamada attending Midosuji Runway in Osaka, Japan in 2022
- Born: May 11, 1963 (age 63); Naniwa-ku, Osaka, Japan
- Spouse: Natsumi Ogawa
- Children: 2 (including; Hama Okamoto)

Comedy career
- Years active: 1982–present
- Medium: Owarai; Television

Masatoshi Hamada (浜田 雅功), nicknamed Hama-chan (浜ちゃん), is a Japanese comedian best known as the tsukkomi half of the owarai duo Downtown alongside Hitoshi Matsumoto. Hamada is married to Natsumi Ogawa, with whom he has two children.

== Early life ==
Hamada was born near Daikokucho Station in Naniwa-ku, Osaka to Kengoro and Nobuko Hamada. His family moved to Amagasaki, Hyōgo Prefecture before entering a kindergarten. There, he attended Ushio Elementary School and met Hitoshi Matsumoto. He and Matsumoto did not become friends until junior high. Like Matsumoto, his family was very poor and lived in an old, run-down apartment building.

In 1982, he and Matsumoto entered Yoshimoto Kōgyō, to become a comedy duo. They made their debut in 1983.

== Comedic character ==
Hamada is frequently seen whacking Matsumoto and other celebrities on their heads, whether it be with his hand, a paper fan, or whatever he is holding at the moment. He laughs with a distinct, high-pitched cackle whenever he sees his colleagues in pain. Never one to hold his tongue, he is known for being blunt and tactless towards everybody, no matter how famous they may be. There is a running joke or legend within the industry that says "Whoever is whacked on the head by Hamada will become successful or ureteru."

Because of his aggressive and seemingly remorseless behavior, he has been dubbed "Hamada the Super Sadist" (ドSの浜田, Do ESU no Hamada). This fearsome side of his personality has been pointed out in the media on several occasions:

- On an episode of Downtown no Gaki no Tsukai ya Arahende!!, Hamada was put on a mock trial (where Matsumoto jokingly demanded the death sentence) for his countless acts of physical abuse and shameless schadenfreude on the show over the years.
- Downtown pulls numerous pranks on their colleagues on Gaki no Tsukai. A common prank is to have Hamada pretend to lose his temper during a filming and become furious towards the unwitting victim. In the past, he has violently attacked the victim, including kneeing him in the face, giving a headbutt, and pulling his hair. His act is so convincing, it has brought his victims to tears. This prank has been pulled on Naoki Tanaka of the comedy duo Cocorico, a regular on Gaki no Tsukai. Tanaka testified during the mock trial, "I cried on someone's chest for the first time in my life."
- On a 2005 episode of Lincoln, Matsumoto offered a "gift" to the younger comedians on the show: he had Hamada restrained upright and gave them the option of throwing a pie in his face or kissing him on the lips, to help them "overcome [their] fear." The younger comedians were afraid of both options. One stated Hamada would bite his tongue off if he tried to kiss him.
- Tsunku of the rock group Sharan Q claims he got his first big break when Hamada hit him on Hey! Hey! Hey! Music Champ. Tsunku has been quoted as saying "A musician will always make it big after being hit by Hamada."

In a recent episode of Gaki no Tsukai, however, a number of younger comedians have said that Hamada's "super sadist" act is just that; he is known to be fair and kind to both staff and other comedians off the air. Jimmy Onishi during his "24 hours Long interview" for Gaki no tsukai even admitted that he got on with Hamada the best since "he was the most normal" of the cast.

=== Running jokes ===
Though not as common, Hamada can also be on the receiving end of jokes, usually delivered by Matsumoto. Some of Hamada's commonly mocked traits are:

- His comically extreme lack of drawing skills. On two separate occasions, Gaki no Tsukai regulars played a game where a subject is presented and their drawing must predict what Hamada's interpretation will look like.
- His childish taste in foods. He enjoys foods that are perceived in Japan to be normally preferred by children, such as hamburger patty, karaage, milk tea, fast food (the Mega Mac in particular), and his all-time favorite, yakisoba. Matsumoto says he has "the taste of a high school freshman" and claims one can improve his mood by putting a fried egg on top of his steak (this is usually only done for children). Despite having once done a series of ads for Georgia, he dislikes coffee. His least favorite food is tomatoes.
- His appearance. Matsumoto frequently calls him ugly and pokes fun at his large lips. Names Matsumoto has called him in the past are "monkey child," "chimpanzee," "baby gorilla," and "lip monster." In the Enthusiastic Teachers Batsu game special his face was digitally put on pictures of Gorillas. Movie critic Osugi said of Hamada's role in Nihonkai that Hamada, thanks to his gorilla-like face, makes a serious Yakuza movie turn into an animal movie. In addition, on at least two occasions (in the 2013 Gaki no Tsukai "Do Not Laugh: Earth Defense Corps" batsu game and the 2015 Gaki no Tsukai "Do Not Laugh: Detective Agency" batsu game), Hamada has been compared to "M1" (M1号 Emu Ichi gō), a monster from the 1966 TV series Ultra Q.

== Additional work ==
Hamada provided the Japanese voice of Slowking in Pokémon: The Movie 2000. A limited edition Pokémon card called "Hama-chan's Slowking" (ハマちゃんのヤドキング, Hama-chan no Yadokingu) was released to promote the movie. The Slowking on this card was illustrated by Hamada himself.

In 2001, he starred in the television miniseries Ashitaga Arusa ("There's Always a Tomorrow"). Named after a famous song by Kyu Sakamoto, it ran from April 21 to July 30 and featured many other Yoshimoto Kōgyō geinin, including Cocorico. A feature film version was released in October 2002.

He is the voice of Shrek in the Japanese language dub of the animated Shrek films. He was personally selected by producer Jeffrey Katzenberg to take on the role.

He worked as a guest sportscaster for Fuji Television at the 2006 Winter Olympics in Turin, Italy.

He was the voice of the host of the sole Japanese release of the American trivia quiz video game series You Don't Know Jack.

=== Music ===
In the 1990s, Hamada was also part of a musical duo with Tetsuya Komuro called H jungle with t (where the "H" stands for Hamada and the "t" stands for Tetsuya) and produced several songs, including their most popular song, "Wow War Tonight", which sold over 2 million copies and ranked number 2 in the top 100 Oricon singles of 1995. H Jungle with t also performed some songs at live concerts during the mid-1990s. In the song "Wow War Tonight", Hitoshi Matsumoto has a line that is repeated several times throughout the course of the song, "B-U-S-A-I-K-U H-A-M-A-D-A", this translates as "Ugly Hamada", one of several of Matsumoto's insults at Hamada. Other common insults are "Gorilla".

In 2004, "Chicken Rice" was released with lyrics written by Matsumoto. The lyrics reflect their childhood (more specifically Matsumoto's childhood) and tells the story about how it was too expensive for them to eat out at restaurants or have nice food, so out of consideration for his parents he would always eat chicken rice as it was the cheapest. The song also asks the rhetorical question "Do children appreciate what their parents do for them nowadays?". This song reached number 2 in the Oricon weekly rankings.

== Personal life ==
Being from Osaka, he speaks in the kansai dialect; however, he uses a standard dialect when talking to his children. His hobbies are golf and baseball. His comedy partner Matsumoto quit smoking in 2003, while he himself is still a heavy smoker.

Although he has always disliked animals, he later became attached to the family dog. In a March 2007 episode of Gaki no Tsukai, when asked what he would save first in his house if an earthquake occurred, his reply was "the dog."

In June 2014, he was revealed to be having an affair with gravure idol Maiko Kikkawa. The affair had lasted for 3 years before its discovery. Hamada wrote a public apology, which his wife accepted.

In 2017 Masatoshi dressed in blackface as Eddie Murphy from the film Beverly Hills Cop for the 2017 New Year's Eve special of Downtown no Gaki no Tsukai ya Arahende!!

In 2023, a 24-year-old esthetician, known as A-san, claimed she had a "sugar dating" relationship with Masatoshi Hamada in 2018–2019. A-san said they met through a mutual acquaintance and had several secret meetings, during which Hamada provided financial support. The claim surfaced after reports of Hamada's alleged separation from his wife, Natsumi Ogawa.

Hamada has denied the separation reports, addressing them publicly on a radio show, but rumors suggest the couple has been living separately for some time.

On March 10, 2025, Yoshimoto Kogyo announced Hamada's temporary hiatus due to poor health, citing "physical discomfort" since late 2024.
