= Hiroyuki Miyasako =

Japanese comedian, television presenter, actor, voice actor (born 1970)

- 宮迫 博之 (Miyasako Hiroyuki)
- Born: March 31, 1970 (age 56); Ibaraki, Osaka, Japan

Comedy career
- Years active: 1989–2019 (as Comedian); 2020– (as YouTuber)
- Medium: Television
- Genre: Conte (boke)

Notes
- Same year/generation as: Jun Nagura (Neptune); Koji Kato (Gokuraku Tombo)

Hiroyuki Miyasako (宮迫博之, Miyasako Hiroyuki; born March 31, 1970 in Osaka) is a Japanese comedian, television presenter, actor, voice actor and plays the boke in Ameagari Kesshitai. His partner is Tōru Hotohara. He is represented by Yoshimoto Kogyo. Miyasako won the award for Best Supporting Actor at the 28th Hochi Film Awards for Thirteen Steps and Wild Berries.

== Career ==
In June 2019, Miyasako, alongside other Yoshimoto Kogyo affiliated comedians, were suspended from activities due to attending parties held by the Yakuza and receiving ¥1 million from them. On July 19, 2019, Miyasako was fired from Yoshimoto Kogyo and held a press conference the following day, accepting the scandal and condemning his part in the yakuza while citing Yoshimoto's own involvement in the scandal.

On July 21, 2019, Yoshimoto issued a press conference to reinstate Miyasako's contract. His ban was lifted on August 19, 2019 but he remains inactive as of January 2020. On January 28, 2020, Miyasako created a YouTube channel and uploads videos regularly. Miyasako's YouTube channel reached 1 million subscribers on July 6, 2020.

== Filmography ==
=== Film ===
- Thirteen Steps (2003)
- Wild Berries (2003)
- Casshern (2004)
- Kamikaze Girls (2004)
- Tokyo Tower (2005)
- The Great Yokai War (2005)
- Mōryō no Hako (2007)
- Big Man Japan (2007)
- 20th Century Boys (2008)
- Cafe Isobe (2008)
- Mega Monster Battle: Ultra Galaxy (2009)
- Ultraman Zero: The Revenge of Belial (2010)

=== Television ===
- At Home Dad (2004)
- Yōkai Ningen Bem (anime) (2006)
- Ryōmaden (2010)
- Zettai Reido (2010)

=== Video games ===
- Yakuza 3 (2009) - Tsuyoshi Kanda
- Yakuza 6: The Song of Life (2016) - Tsuyoshi Nagumo
- Yakuza Kiwami 3 & Dark Ties (2026) - Tsuyoshi Kanda

=== Japanese dub ===
- Jeremy Renner
  - The Avengers (2012) (Hawkeye)
  - Avengers: Age of Ultron (2015) (Hawkeye)
  - Captain America: Civil War (2016) (Hawkeye)
  - Avengers: Endgame (2019) (Hawkeye)
- Goal! (2006) (Zinedine Zidane)
- The Incredibles (2004) (Buddy Pine/Syndrome)

=== Stage play ===
- Kūchū Buranko (2008)
