= Hitoshi Matsumoto =

Japanese comedian (born 1963)

- 松本人志
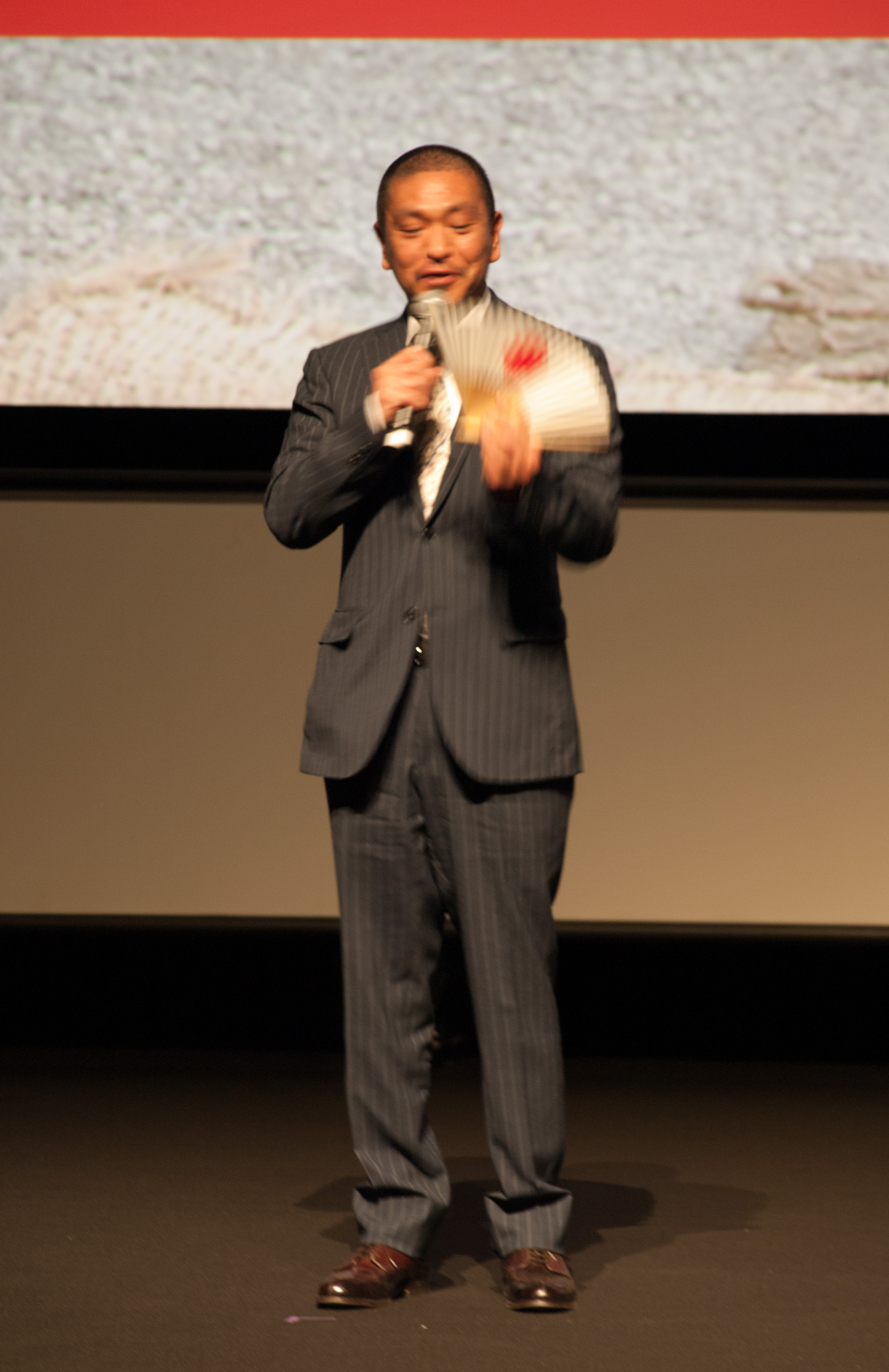
- Hitoshi Matsumoto in 2011
- Born: September 8, 1963 (age 63); Amagasaki, Japan
- Occupations: Comedian, film director, screenwriter
- Years active: 1983–present
- Height: 173 cm (5 ft 8 in)
- Spouse: Rin Ihara (2009-present)
- Children: 1

Hitoshi Matsumoto (松本 人志, Matsumoto Hitoshi; born September 8, 1963) is a Japanese comedian and filmmaker. He was born in Amagasaki, Hyōgo Prefecture. He is one half of the comedy duo Downtown, alongside Masatoshi Hamada, and is one of the most popular comedians in Japan.

Matsumoto has directed several movies beginning in 2007 with Big Man Japan, in several of which he also starred as the main character.

Matsumoto created and hosted the Amazon Prime Video series Documental, which aired from 2016 to 2023. Documental was adapted internationally as LOL: Last One Laughing, with versions distributed in 31 countries.

In late 2023, the Japanese weekly magazine Shūkan Bunshun published allegations concerning Matsumoto’s conduct at private gatherings, including claims of non-consensual sexual activity. In early 2024, Matsumoto suspended his public entertainment activities while pursuing a defamation lawsuit against the magazine’s publisher. He later withdrew the lawsuit in 2024.

In November 2025, he resumed his entertainment activities through DOWNTOWN+, a paid streaming service launched that month.

== Early life ==
Matsumoto was born in Amagasaki, Hyōgo, to a poor family.

He has expressed his feelings about growing up in a poor household in a poem titled Chicken Rice (チキンライス, Chikin Raisu) which Hamada turned into a song in 2004. In his poem, he wrote how laughter was the only way to get through those times.

He credits his poverty for giving him a good imagination and sense of play, as it forced him to invent his own games to entertain himself. His favourite manga as a child was Tensai Bakabon by Fujio Akatsuka. He aspired to become a manga artist.

He graduated from Amagasaki Municipal Ushio Elementary School, Amagasaki Municipal Taisei Junior High School, and the mechanical engineering department of Hyogo Prefectural Amagasaki Technical High School. His classmates in elementary and junior high school included his future comedy partner Masatoshi Hamada, as well as broadcast writer Mitsuyoshi Takasu. His nickname during elementary and junior high school was “Mattsun".

During his elementary school years, his father began receiving invitation tickets to Umeda Kagetsu from his workplace, and the family started attending performances together. This became his first encounter with comedy, and he gradually developed an aspiration to become a comedian. He later recalled, “Around that time, my personality gradually started to change. I had always been a gloomy child.”

Although he first met Hamada in the lower grades of elementary school, they did not become close at the time because Hamada’s appearance was extremely unusual. Around the fourth grade, he formed a trio called “Koma Third Branch” with his friends Ito and Morioka. They each took on names such as "iron spinning top", "wooden spinning top", and "plastic spinning top", and were already performing manzai at that time.

Afterward, he continued performing manzai and comedy skits with Ito. He recalled that when they performed a skit for the first time, “it bombed so badly that it was unbelievable.”

== Junior high school period ==
During junior high school, he often spent time with Ito and Hamada as a group of three. One day, Ito and Hamada had a fight. After it ended, Hamada came up to him and said, “Mattsun, let’s go,” and Matsumoto chose to go with Hamada. Reflecting on that time, Matsumoto stated: “At that moment, I guess I chose Hamada over Ito… (omitted) Even if I had stayed with Ito, I don’t think the two of us would have joined Yoshimoto together. Hamada has initiative… (omitted) He was the one who kept pushing me, saying ‘Let’s join Yoshimoto, let’s go.’”

Later, during the public recording event "Hōsōshitsu Takasu-chan 40th Birthday Festival" at Nippon Budokan on 27 December 2003, Ito himself recalled that the cause of the fight was that “Hamada kept teasing my younger brother; at first I laughed, but gradually, as his older brother, I got irritated,” which led to the conflict. He later enrolled in the mechanical engineering department of Hyogo Prefectural Amagasaki Technical High School.

== Path to becoming a comedian ==
In 1982, he formed a duo with Hamada and entered NSC (Yoshimoto New Star Creation) as a first-term student of the Osaka school. While enrolled, they performed without a fixed duo name, but in 1983 officially adopted the name “Downtown.” After working primarily in the Kansai region for a time, they moved to Tokyo in 1988 with the program Yume de Aetara.

From 1993 to 1995, he serialised his essays (“Off-Off Downtown”) in Shūkan Asahi, which were later compiled into books titled Isho and Matsumoto. These sold 2.5 million and 2 million copies respectively, occupying the first and second positions in annual book sales rankings in 1995 (according to Tohan).

In 1994, he held the live show "Sun-dome Kaikyō" (tentative title), and in 1995, "Matsukaze ’95". Sun-dome Kaikyō was a comedy live performance with an admission fee of 10,000 yen, featuring performers such as Koji Imada, Koji Higashino, and Itsuji Itao (130R). Matsukaze ’95 was held at Nippon Budokan with a post-payment system where the audience decided the ticket price, consisting solely of the segment “One comment per photo". In 1996, Hitori Gottsu began broadcasting. It continued for about two years under changing titles such as Shin Hitori Gottsu and Matsu Gottsu. In December 1998, Hitoshi Matsumoto 24-Hour Ogiri was broadcast. In the summer of 1998, he changed his long-standing slicked-back hairstyle to a shaved head. He explained that the reason was “because constantly fixing my hair messed up by Hamada’s tsukkomi felt uncool.” From 1998 to 1999, he released the VHS series HITOSI MATUMOTO VISUALBUM, which was later released on DVD in 2003.

== 2000s ==
In 2000, he created the concept of and appeared in the television drama Densetsu no Kyōshi. This was his first and effectively last starring role in a drama, as he had maintained a stance of not appearing in dramas (except for cameo appearances).

On October 4, 2001, he began the radio program Hōsōshitsu with Takasu, which continued for approximately seven and a half years until its conclusion on March 28, 2009.

In 2007, he released the film Big Man Japan, for which he served as planner, screenwriter, director, and actor, marking his debut as a film director. The film was invited to the Directors’ Fortnight section of the Cannes Film Festival. In connection with this, he received the Topic Award at the 8th Beat Takeshi Entertainment Awards hosted by Tokyo Sports in 2008.

From 2001, he served as a judge in the finals of the M-1 Grand Prix. He appeared in every edition aside from those of 2004, 2015, and 2024, making him the judge with the most appearances. In October 2002, Hataraku Ossan Ningyō began airing. It was broadcast on Sunday mornings, and after its conclusion, its successor program Morning Big Taidan aired in the same time slot.

From 2004, he served as host and planner of Hitoshi Matsumoto no Suberanai Hanashi, and from 2009 as chairman of the comedy competition IPPON Grand Prix, also playing a role in discovering and nurturing young talent.

From 2008, he served as MC of King of Conte as part of Downtown. From 2015 onward, Hamada alone served as MC, while Matsumoto became a judge. Since returning as an M-1 judge in 2016, Matsumoto has served as a judge for both M-1 and King of Conte.

On March 28, 2009, Hōsōshitsu ended. He stated that the reason was his desire to reduce occasions where he talked about his private life..The free talk segment on Downtown no Gaki no Tsukai ya Arahende!! also ended temporarily with the December 6, 2009 broadcast.

In April 2009, Hitoshi Matsumoto no marumaru na Hanashi began broadcasting, and in April 2010 it moved to a prime-time slot. This was the first time Matsumoto had a solo prime-time show bearing his name.

== 2010s ==
In June 2010, he suffered a labral tear in his left hip joint and announced a hiatus of about one to two months to undergo surgery. He later returned on August 18, 2010, during a recording of Downtown no Gaki no Tsukai ya Arahende!!. On October 15, 2010, he appeared in the sketch program MHK, his first such television appearance in nine years, followed by a special episode of Professional: Shigoto no Ryūgi focusing on him on October 16. Since December 2014, he has dyed his hair blond to conceal gray hair and has grown it longer.

In 2016, ''Documental'' began streaming on Amazon Prime Video. The format was later adapted internationally as ''LOL: Last One Laughing'', beginning with a Mexican version in April 2019. As of 2026, localized versions had been produced in more than 25 countries and regions, including Italy, Germany, and France. The format has been described by industry observers as one of the fastest-growing entertainment formats in recent years

From the November 29, 2019 broadcast, he became the third chief of Tantei! Night Scoop, marking the first time he succeeded a previous host in such a role.

== 2020s ==
On June 12, 2021, the sketch program King of Conte no Kai aired on TBS. This marked the first new television sketch performance in about 20 years since Downtown no Monogottsu Ee Kanji Special (2001).

Regarding reports that the program achieved a household rating of 6.8% (Video Research, Kanto region), Matsumoto commented on Twitter (now X) that the show was a success both in content and ratings, and questioned why media outlets continued to focus on household ratings, emphasizing instead the importance of core audience ratings.

== Suspension and return ==
From the beginning of 2024, Matsumoto suspended his entertainment activities in order to focus on legal proceedings against Bungeishunju and the editor-in-chief of Shūkan Bunshun. On November 1, 2025, he resumed activities by appearing in a live broadcast on the paid streaming service “DOWNTOWN+,” operated by Yoshimoto Kogyo and FANY, marking his return after approximately one year and ten months. He stated that he decided to return because he had heard that the Japanese comedy industry was struggling. At the time of the service's launch, a video featuring Matsumoto was released on its official social media accounts. Following the initial broadcast, several new works produced by and starring Matsumoto, along with past Downtown-related content, were made available on the platform.

According to media reports, the official YouTube channel for the service surpassed 200 million cumulative views.

In addition, the number of subscribers was reported to have exceeded 500,000 within approximately 20 days of the service’s registration opening.

== Recent activities ==
As of 2026, his activities have primarily centered on content distributed through “DOWNTOWN+,” while his appearances in other media, including commercials, have remained limited.

In March 2026, he appeared in a commercial aired during Downtown no Gaki no Tsukai ya Arahende!!, marking his first appearance on terrestrial television in approximately two years.

Meanwhile, television networks have stated that a full return to existing terrestrial television programs such as Wednesday's Downtown remains undecided at this stage.

In August 2026, Yoshimoto Kogyo announced the first U.S. adaptation of Documental, created and produced by Hitoshi Matsumoto.The series is produced by Fulwell Entertainment, with Eric Pankowski as showrunner and executive producer alongside Ben Winston and Emma Conway.First released in Japan in 2016, Documental has since been adapted as LOL: Last One Laughing in 25 countries and territories, with over 80 seasons produced worldwide.

== Career ==
Although he secured a job at a printing office, to pursue his dream of becoming a comedian, he was invited by Hamada in 1982 to enter Yoshimoto Kōgyō. Together, they became Downtown, and made their major debut in 1983. The Downtown comedy duo loosely follow the manzai style of Japanese comedy, where Matsumoto plays the half-wit, and his partner plays the straight man.

== Personal life ==
=== Bachelorhood ===
Matsumoto remained single with no history of marriage for years after his comedy partner, Hamada, was married with children. He stated that he was not into romance, finding acts such as sharing a bed or bathing with someone else bothersome and unnecessary.

It was revealed in July 2008 that Matsumoto was dating then 25-year-old tarento Rin Ihara. In the evening of May 17, 2009, it was announced that Matsumoto's official bachelorhood had ended with a secret marriage ceremony between himself and the aforementioned Ihara. Ihara, a former weather announcer for the Japanese news program "ズームイン!! Super" (Zoom In!! Super) is nineteen years Matsumoto's junior, and apparently became pregnant by Matsumoto, prompting the marriage. The announcement of the marriage came via fax by Matsumoto's managing organization to several media outlets, including a personal message by Matsumoto himself: "My partner will quit her job and is currently pregnant. As this is a delicate time, I would like this to be dealt with as gently as possible. It would be best to hold a press conference, however I'm too embarrassed to, so I won't."

On October 6, 2009, Matsumoto and Rin Ihara became parents to a daughter. At the time, Matsumoto was in South Korea for the screening of the film "Symbol."

=== Interests ===
Matsumoto's hobbies include driving, billiards, and video games.

As an admirer of Vincent van Gogh, he has gone to Amsterdam to visit The Van Gogh Museum. These trips were filmed for The True Hitoshi Matsumoto (松本人志の本当, Matsumoto Hitoshi no Hontō), a special NHK BS documentary series. Another figure he respects is the late comedian, Kanbi Fujiyama.

He enjoys tokusatsu shows and owns DVD box sets of series such as Kamen Rider and Giant Robo. He has parodied tokusatsu a number of times on his previous show, Downtown no Gottsu Ee Kanji (with characters such as the Go-Renjai, Miracle Ace and Aho Aho Man), and in his directorial film debut, Big Man Japan.

=== Health ===
He has demonstrated good physical fitness on Gaki no Tsukai. He defeated his comedy partner Hamada in a high jump competition by clearing 1.40m on the first try. In 1999, he outran Hamada, Hōsei Yamasaki and both members of Cocorico in a 100-meter race (he ran the entire length while the other four ran a quarter of the length each in the form of a relay race). Three years later, he performed notably better than them in a long jump competition.

Although he claims to have no interest in sports, he has occasionally dabbled in boxing as he is friends with former world boxing champion Joichiro Tatsuyoshi.

Once a heavy cigarette smoker, he quit in 2003.

On June 28, 2010, Yoshimoto Kogyo announced that Matsumoto would not be performing on any shows for two months due to an injury on his left hip, which required surgery. For two episodes, the remaining Gaki no Tsukai cast members discussed his condition, with Matsumoto returning to hosting on August 31, 2010. In subsequent segments of the show requiring rigorous physical activities, such as the annual New Year's Eve 24-Hour Batsu Games of recent years, he is exempted and instead given idle or captive roles, due to his previous injury.

During the 2011 Gaki no Tsukai batsu game involving the group becoming airline assistants, Matsumoto revealed he had suffered a stress fracture preparing for said batsu game, and despite doctor's orders, he still participated in the batsu game.

== Allegations and Legal Proceedings ==
In December 2023, the weekly magazine Shukan Bunshun published testimonies from multiple women who alleged that they had experienced sexual misconduct by Hitoshi Matsumoto in connection with a gathering said to have taken place in 2015. The testimonies were provided anonymously. In response, Matsumoto’s agency stated that the allegations were entirely unfounded. Other anonymous allegations followed of other women with similar accounts. Matsumoto himself also denied the claims and indicated his intention to pursue legal action. Following the reports, he suspended part of his entertainment activities.

In January 2024, Matsumoto filed a lawsuit against Bungeishunju, the publisher of the magazine, seeking damages on the grounds of defamation. Court proceedings began in the same year; however, in November 2024, Matsumoto withdrew the lawsuit. According to legal representatives for both parties, no financial settlement was made between them. In a statement, Matsumoto said that if any of the women who attended the gathering had felt uncomfortable, he would like to express his apology.

== List of works ==
=== Films ===
Comic shorts:

- Tōzu (頭頭) (1993)
- Sundome Kaikyō (寸止め海峡) (1995)
- Visualbum Vol. Apple – Promise (ビジュアルバム Vol. リンゴ – 約束) (1998)
- Visualbum Vol. Banana – Kindness (ビジュアルバム Vol. バナナ – 親切) (1998)
- Visualbum Vol. Grape – Relief (ビジュアルバム Vol. ブドウ – 安心) (1999)
- Sasuke (佐助) (2001)
- Zassā (ザッサー) (2006)

Full-length movies:

- Big Man Japan (2007)
- Symbol (2009)
- Saya Zamurai (2011)
- R100 (2013)
- Violence Voyager (2019), narrator

=== Television and radio ===
- Hitori gottsu (一人ごっつ) (1996–1997)
- Densetsu no kyōshi (伝説の教師) (2000)
- Ashita ga aru sa (明日があるさ) (2001)
- Hōsō-shitsu (放送室) (Since 2001)
- Hitoshi Matsumoto no suberanai hanashi (人志松本のすべらない話) (Since 2004)
- Ippon Grand Prix (IPPONグランプリ) (Since 2009)
- Matsumoto Hitoshi no Konto (MHK) (松本人志のコント) (2010)
- Hitoshi Matsumoto Presents Documental (Since 2016)

=== Books ===
- Isho (遺書) (1994) ISBN 978-4-02-256809-0
- Matsumoto (松本) (1995) ISBN 978-4-02-256898-4
- Matsumoto Hitoshi Ai (松本人志 愛) (1998) ISBN 978-4-02-257300-1
- Matsumoto Bōzu (松本坊主) (1999) ISBN 978-4-947599-62-9
- Zukan (図鑑) (2000) ISBN 978-4-02-257550-0
- Matsumoto Cinema Bōzu (松本シネマ坊主) (2002) ISBN 978-4-8222-1733-4
- Matsumoto Saiban (松本裁判) (2002) ISBN 978-4-86052-002-1
- Teihon Hitorigottsu (定本一人ごっつ) ISBN 978-4-86052-024-3
- Sukika, Kiraika – Matsumoto Hitoshi no Nigenron (好きか、嫌いか – 松本人志の二元論) (2004) ISBN 978-4-08-780401-0
- Sukika, Kiraika 2 – Matsumoto Hitoshi no Saishuu Sanban (好きか、嫌いか2 – 松本人志の最終裁判) (2005) ISBN 978-4-08-780422-5
- Cinema Bōzu 2 (シネマ坊主2) (2005) ISBN 978-4-8222-1744-0
- Cinema Bōzu 3 (シネマ坊主3) (2008) ISBN 978-4-8222-6321-8
- Matsumoto Hitoshi No Ikari Akaban (松本人志の怒り 赤版) (2008) ISBN 978-4-08-780503-1
- Matsumoto Hitoshi No Ikari Aoban (松本人志の怒り 青版) (2008) ISBN 978-4-08-780504-8
