= Why Did You Come to Japan? =

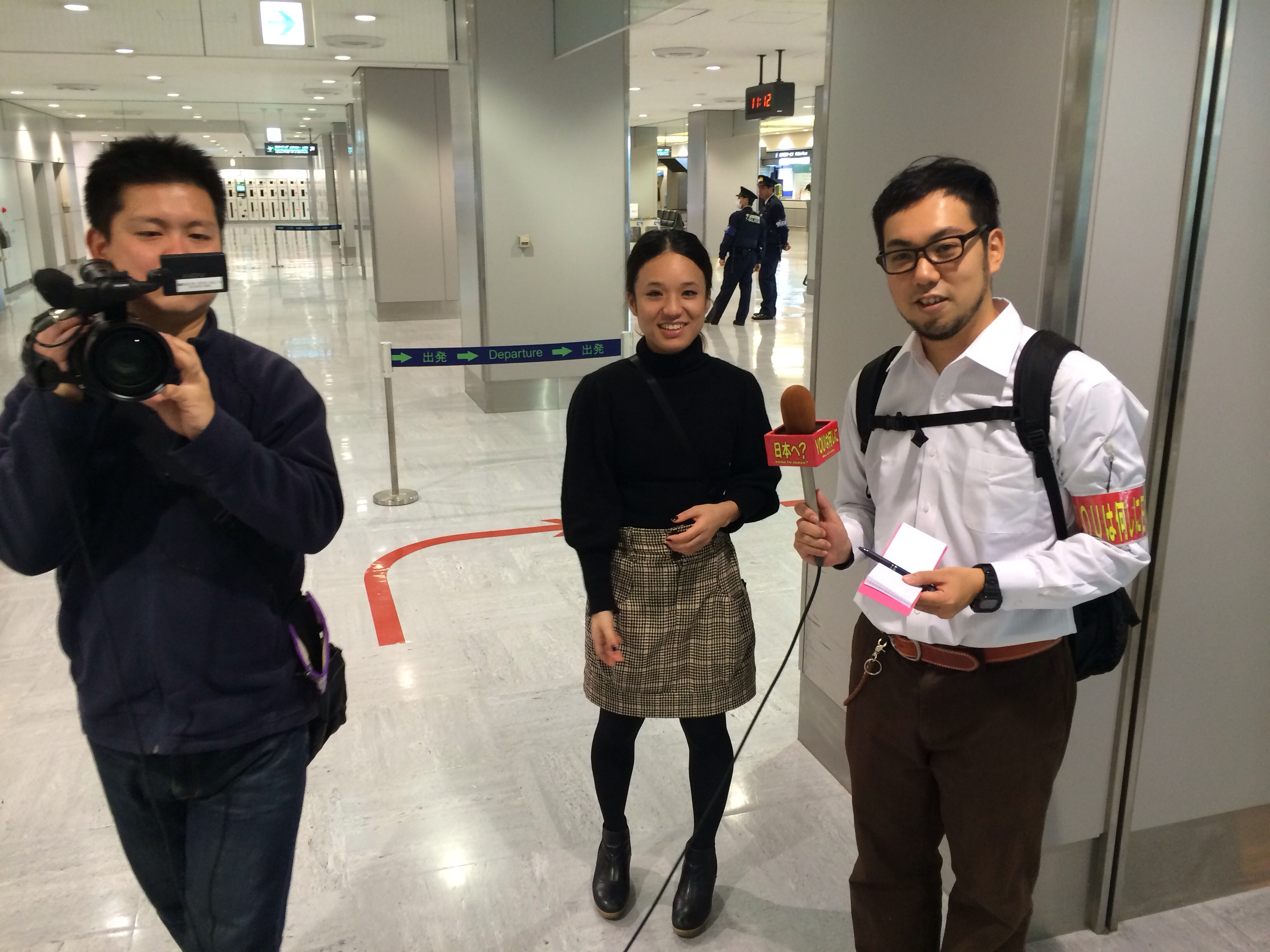
- TV Tokyo interviewers at Narita Airport in December 2013
- Also known as: YOUは何しに日本へ？
- Presented by: Osamu Shitara and Yūki Himura (Bananaman)
- Voices of: Daniel Kahl; Carolyn Kawasaki
- Narrated by: various
- Country of origin: Japan
- Original language: Japanese

Production
- Production company: TV Tokyo

Original release
- Network: TXN (TV Tokyo)
- Release: 30 June 2012 – present

Why Did You Come to Japan? (YOUは何しに日本へ？, Yū wa Nani Shi ni Nippon e?) is a Japanese television program presented by Osamu Shitara and Yūki Himura, a comedy duo known as "Bananaman". It is a regular programme on TV Tokyo on Monday evenings. The show was first broadcast in the form of two pilot shows in June and October 2012 before becoming a recurring series, airing late on Wednesday nights starting 9 January 2013. Due to its popularity, it was moved to the prime time evening slot on Mondays beginning with the episode broadcast on 15 April 2013, where it has been airing (with slight time changes) ever since. In the programme, a team of interviewers go around various airports in Japan, with Narita International Airport as their main reporting hub, and ask non-Japanese arrivals "Why did you come to Japan?". They then attempt to follow the interviewees on their journeys around Japan, in a process called mitchaku shuzai (密着取材; lit. "close-contact reporting"). A question posed for departees is, "What souvenir did you buy?" Besides interviewing people at airports, another skit tries to find non–English teaching foreigners in randomly chosen cities throughout Japan.

The show has used various narrators such as Bobby Ologun, Daniel Kahl and Carolyn Kawasaki among others. A special episode aired on 12 November 2018 had members of girl idol group Nogizaka46, of whom Bananaman are so-called "official brothers", as guest interviewers. The programme has featured coincidental encounters with celebrities at the airport, including British actor Benedict Cumberbatch and American former baseball player Leron Lee.
