= Halfway (Gen Hoshino song) =

Single by Gen Hoshino
- Language: Japanese
- Released: June 19, 2020
- Studio: Home studio
- Length: 3:04
- Label: Speedstar
- Songwriter: Gen Hoshino
- Producer: Gen Hoshino

Gen Hoshino singles chronology
"Idea" (2018)	"Halfway" (2020)	"Fushigi" / "Create" (2021)

Music video
- "Halfway" on YouTube

"Halfway" (Japanese: 折り合い, Hepburn: Oriai; lit. 'Compromise') is a song by Japanese singer-songwriter and musician Gen Hoshino. Written and produced by him, he handled all elements of production and the instrumentation except mixing. While experimenting with keyboards from home during the COVID-19 pandemic, Hoshino wrote "Halfway" as a birthday song to comedian Yūki Himura. He performed it on the Himura's radio show in May 2020, before the song was surprise released by Speedstar Records as a digital single on June 19, 2020. A hip hop-styled track, it is composed of a simplistic beat that loops. The lyrics, which include a rap section, depicts a protagonist who tries to amend the everyday relationship with their partner.

Critics found the track enjoyable for its lyrics and programmed music production. It reached numbers 26 and 27 on the Billboard Japan Hot 100 and Oricon Combined Singles Charts, respectively. Sho Miyake directed the music video, which was uploaded alongside the song's surprise release. It depicts two people (played by Hoshino and actress Shizuka Ishibashi) in self-quarantine during the pandemic. Hoshino performed "Halfway" during his online concert Gratitude, which celebrated the tenth anniversary of his solo career.

== Background and release ==
Since 2010, singer-songwriter and musician Gen Hoshino has written and performed an annual birthday song for the comedian Yūki Himura on the TBS Radio show of his owarai duo Bananaman. Some of these songs were later reworked into parts of Hoshino's discography, such as his singles "Sun" (2015) and "Family Song" (2017), and were described by Real Sound's Natsuna Murakami as a showcase of his and Bananaman's friendship. After the song in 2019, Hoshino decided to take a break from the tradition; later, he laughed that he had grown tired of it. The first ten songs were compiled onto Yellow Disc: Birthday Songs for Yuki Himura — Bananaman and Gen Hoshino 2010–2019, a CD bundled with the fourth issue of Hoshino's annual Yellow Magazine, in early 2020.

In April 2020, during the COVID-19 pandemic, Hoshino posted a one-minute video of an acoustic song titled "Dancing on the Inside" to Instagram and asked users to finish it. The initiative became a viral phenomenon in Japan that attracted responses from various artists and celebrities, including a controversial video from prime minister Shinzo Abe. Since the pandemic left his schedule cleared, Hoshino then allocated time to practice using digital audio workstations (DAWs) and keyboard; previously a composer on guitar, he thought the new instruments would help further develop his sound. Over a phone call, he received a lecture on the workings of DAWs from music producer and drummer Mabanua, who had participated in the "Dancing on the Inside" trend.

Though Hoshino did not initially intend to write a birthday song for Himura in 2020, free time as a result of the pandemic coerced him into doing so. Written, produced, and recorded by Hoshino from home using DAWs, he based the song on a story of Himura secretly eating behind the back of his wife. On May 15, 2020, Hoshino debuted "Halfway" on Bananaman's radio show, even though he initially appeared on the pretense of not delivering a song. He presented it as a follow-up to "Dancing on the Inside"; four days later, he teased that it would be formally released within "the near future". Alongside its music video, "Halfway" was surprise released by Speedstar Records for streaming and download on June 19, 2020. With "Dancing on the Inside" and other miscellaneous songs, it was re-released via In Gratitude, a bonus CD included with Gen Hoshino Singles Box: Gratitude, on October 21, 2020.

== Composition and lyrics ==
"Halfway"
A Japanese hip hop-styled track, "Halfway" features a minimal beat that critics found peaceful and reminiscent to a sense of daily life.

Three minutes and four seconds long, "Halfway" was programmed and arranged by Hoshino, who also plays all of its instruments. The only other credit is for Shojiro Watanabe, who mixed the song. A hip hop-styled track, it is comprised by a minimal beat that loops, a constrasting style to the ensemble sound found on Hoshino's prior works. One section features Hoshino performing rap vocals. Rockin'On Japan's Hirokazu Koike, who found the track to be peaceful, described "Halfway" as a crossover between Caribbean steelpan-like tropical sounds and a modern trap beat. Kazusa Ogiwara, writing for Real Sound, thought that the song was infused with a sense of normalcy and daily life.

A love song, Koike wrote that the lyrics on "Halfway" depict a "casual, everyday human relationship". It presents a protagonist who tries to amend the relationship with their partner: "I got caught for what I tried to hide the other day / So I gotta figure out how to apologize". Hoshino sings: "We're always searching for that point / Where we look like strangers when we're not / We're just trying to meet halfway". Ogiwara thought the track reflected Hoshino's genuine thoughts on the present within the pandemic, and found the theming reminiscent to "Barabara", a track from his debut album Baka no Uta (2010).

== Reception ==
"Halfway" received generally favorable reviews from Japanese critics. Writing for Rockin'On Japan, Hirokazu Koike personally found enjoyment in the lyrics and Hoshino's programming work, but thought that the composition would be generally perceived by most listeners as "simple and airy". In a Real Sound article, Kazusa Ogiwara opined that Hoshino prevented the artificial sounds from making the song sound inorganic; she called it a "warm and soft" track and wrote that it is "personal, but not solitary". Retrospectively, Mikiki's Ryūtarō Amano described "Halfway" and "Dancing on the Inside" as tracks that could only have been written during the COVID-19 pandemic.

Commercially, "Halfway" entered and peaked at number 26 on the Billboard Japan Hot 100 dated June 24, 2020, and at number 27 on the Oricon Combined Singles Chart dated June 29. Downloaded 13,760 times within its first week, it reached number six on Billboard Japan's Download Songs sub-chart.

== Promotion ==
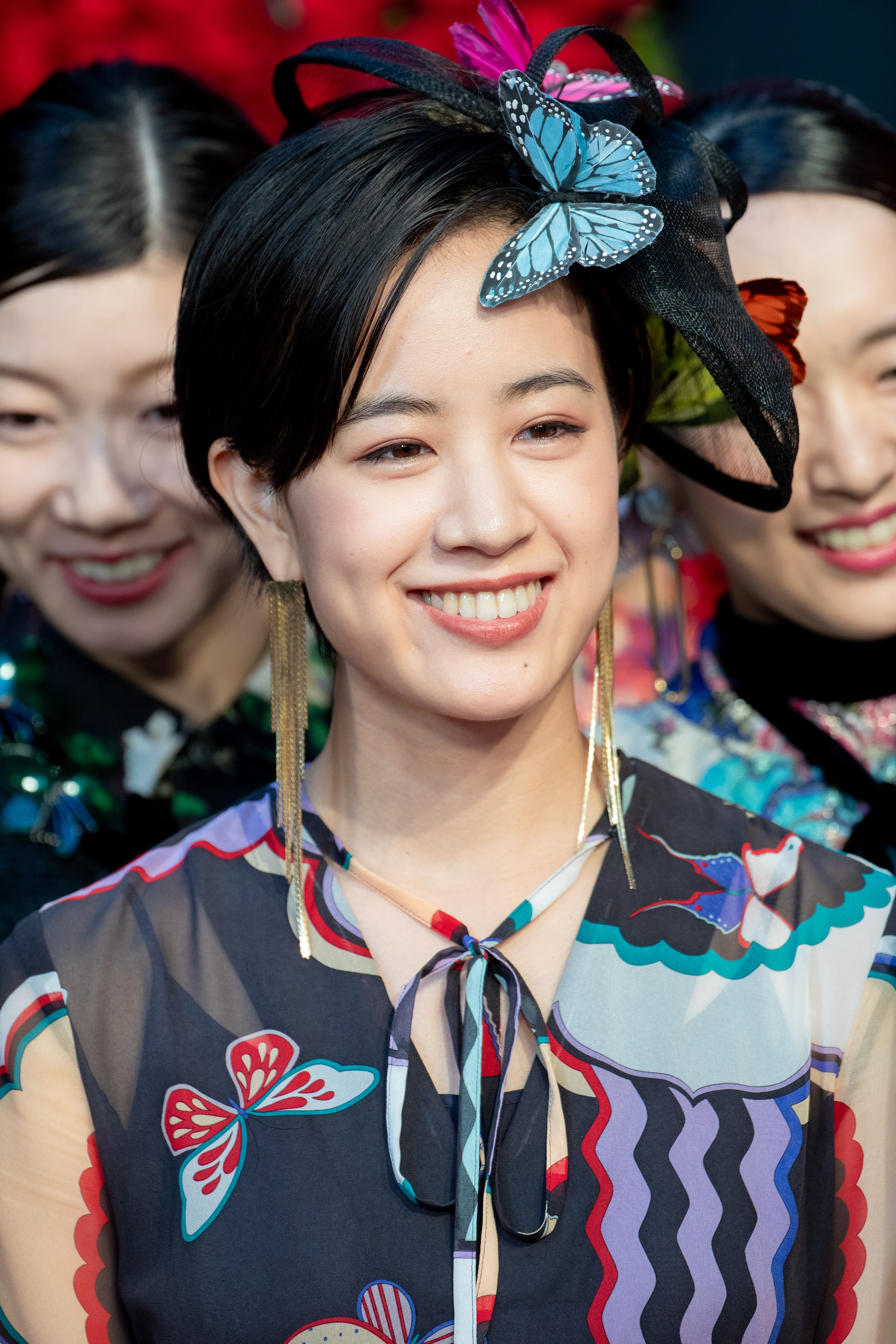
Actress Shizuka Ishibashi (pictured in 2018) co-stars in the "Halfway" music video.

Sho Miyake with the studio TheFool directed the "Halfway" music video, which follows the daily life of two people from their homes, in self-quarantine during the pandemic. Alongside Hoshino, it stars actress Shizuka Ishibashi, who appeared in Miyake's And Your Bird Can Sing (2018). According to Miyake, he was contacted about directing the video in late May, and they scheduled to record it as soon as COVID-19 restrictions were loosened up. Having heard about the song's from-home production, he conceptualized the video to illustrate this process. In an interview with Real Sound, Miyake recalled that filming was completed within two days.

Hoshino gave a debut performance of "Halfway" at the Club Quattro live house for his online concert Gratitude on July 12, 2020, in celebration of his tenth anniversary as a solo artist. The song was arranged in a live ensemble style that added saxophone by Satoru Takeshima and choral vocals by keyboardist Eiko Ishibashi and guitarist Ryosuke Nagaoka. FanplusMusic's Aki Ito thought it was one of the songs from the concert that highlighted Hoshino's vocals.

== Credits and personnel ==
Credits adapted from "Halfway" on Hoshino's official website

Music and production

- Gen Hoshino – lead vocals, background vocals, all instruments, songwriting, arrangement, programming, recording
- Shojiro Watanabe – mix

Music video — Produced with TheFool Inc.

- Sho Miyake – direction
- Hidetoshi Shinomiya – direction of photography
- Masato Nunobe – art direction
- Takurō Iwaya – assistant direction
- Masayoshi Jōnai – production
- Kōrō Tanaka – production management
- Takakusagi Go – hair and make-up for Hoshino
- Rumi Hirose – hair and make-up for Ishibashi
- Teppei – styling for Hoshino
- Ayano Tachibana – styling for Ishibashi
- Gen Hoshino – cast
- Shizuka Ishibashi – cast

== Charts ==
Weekly chart performance for "Halfway" (2020)
Chart (2020)	Peak position
Japan (Billboard Japan Hot 100)	26
Japanese Combined (Oricon)	27
