= Kazuya Kojima =

Japanese comedian and actor (born 1972)

Ooshima Kojima
- 大島 一哉
- Born: 16 July 1972 (age 54); Hachiōji, Tokyo
- Other names: Koji (コジ); Koji no Ran (コジの乱)
- Education: Tokyo Metropolitan Hino High School; School JCA
- Occupations: Comedian; actor
- Years active: 1993–
- Agent: Production Jinrikisha
- Style: Conte (boke); Kire Gei
- Television: Variety; Chō Ponkatsu Summers; Kore tte Aridesu ka?; Shirushirumishiru-san Day; Lincoln; AKB48 Conte "Nani mo soko made..."; Girls TV! feat Super Girls; Kore Kangaeta Hito, Tensai ja ne!? –Ima sugu Yakudatsu Seikatsu no Chie, Atsumemashita– Drama Furītā, Ka o Kau.; Drama; Freeter, Ie wo Kau; Karyū no Utage; Hana no Zubora-Meshi; Kyūmei Byōtō 24-ji Dai 5 Series; Roosevelt Game; Funassyi Tantei
- Height: 177 cm (5 ft 10 in)
- Partner: Ken Watabe

Kazuya Kojima (児嶋 一哉, Kojima Kazuya; born 16 July 1972, in Hachiōji, Tokyo) is a Japanese comedian and actor. He performs boke (he can also perform Kire Gei or tsukkomi) in the comedy duo Unjash with his partner Ken Watabe.

Kojima's most well known gag is the mispronunciation or mistake of his last name "Kojima", as he is frequently called other names on purpose such as "Ooshima" for comedic effects. He would then loudly respond to the mistake with "I'm Kojima!" as a part of the gag.

== Discography ==
=== Singles ===
Year	Title	Notes	Ref.
2016	"Narou yo"	Duet with Misako Uno (AAA)	

== Filmography ==
=== Variety ===
Current appearances

Year	Title	Network	Notes
2014	Chō Ponkatsu Summers	TV Tokyo	Regular

One-off/irregular appearances

Year	Title	Network	Notes
	Ameagari Ketsushitai no Talk bangumi Ame-talk!	TV Asahi	
	London Hearts	TV Asahi	
2007	Uchimura Summers	Tokyo MX	Irregular appearances
2011	Ogi Yahagi Ogi no Natsuhachi Tō! 80's no Aishi-kata	Family Gekijo	
2012	run for money Tōsō-chū	Fuji TV	
2012	battle for money Sentō-chū	Fuji TV	
2016	VS Arashi	Fuji TV	Appeared fourteen times, but Yūki Himura boasted the sequence in his second appearance

Former appearances

Year	Title	Network	Notes	Ref.
2009	The! Sekai Gyōten News	NTV	As Osugi of Osugi to Peeco (Peeco was played by Take 2 Fukasawa)	
2011	Kore tte Aridesu ka?	NTV	Subordinate	
2012	Goddotan	TV Tokyo		
2012	SMAP×SMAP	Fuji TV		
2012	Honoo-no Taiiku-kai TV	TBS		
2012	Nogizakatte, doko?	TV Tokyo		
2012	Quiz! Ichigan	TBS		
2012	Tokyo Hit Girl	NTV		
2012	Sekai itte mitara Honto wa konna Tokodatta!?	Fuji TV		
2012	Non Stop!	Fuji TV	Quasi-regular	
2012	Strike TV	TV Asahi		
2012	Banana Honō	Tokyo MX		
2012	Daisuke Miyagawa to Junichi Kawamoto no suberanai Hanashi	Fuji TV	(Note: Slipping story (Lincoln planning) who also had a leading experience (even with Yūki Himura and Tetsurō Degawa).)	
2012	Shirushirumishiru-san Day	TV Asahi	"Zenkoku Nippon 1 Shisatsu"	
2012	Sunday Japon	TBS		
2012	Numer0n	Fuji TV		
2012	Daisuke Miyagawa to Koyabu Chitoyo no suberanai Hanashi	Fuji TV		
	Lincoln	TBS		
2013	Bakushō sokkuri monomane Kōhaku Uta Gassen Special	Fuji TV	Appeared with Anti-age Tokuizumi as Kojima	
2013	SKE48 no Magical Radio	NTV		
2013	Girls TV! feat Super Girls	NKT	MC	
2014	AKB48 Conte "Nani mo soko made..."	Hikari TV Channel		
2014	Shumi Baka	Sun TV		
2014	Sando no bonyarinu TV	TBC		
2015	Kore Kangaeta Hito, Tensai ja ne!? –Ima sugu Yakudatsu Seikatsu no Chie, Atsumemashita– Drama Furītā, Ka o Kau.	TV Tokyo	MC	
2016	Buckingcam Kyūden	SDT	MC	

=== TV dramas ===
Year	Title	Role	Network	Notes	Ref.
2010	Ryōmaden	Kondō Renpei	NHK	Episode 1	
2010	Midorikawa Keibu Series	Takayuki Hisamoto	TBS		
2010	Freeter, Ie wo Kau	Masahiko Kitayama	Fuji TV		
2011	Akai Yubi "Shinsanmono" Kyoichiro Kaga Futatabi!	Sato	TBS		
2011	Marumo no Okite	Ryoichi Chiba	Fuji TV	Episodes 2, 7, 9	
2011	Umareru.	Tamaki	TBS	Episodes 6 to Final Episode	
2011	Karyū no Utage	Tatsuhiko Mizutani	NHK		
2012	Dirty Mama!	Seiichi Miyake	NTV	Episodes 1 and 2	
2012	Meitantei Conan Drama Special Shinichi Kudo: Kyoto Shinsengumi Satsujin Jiken	Noboru Saginuma	YTV		
2012	Umechan Sensei	Police officer	NHK	Episode 27	
2012	Hana no Zubora-Meshi	Hayai	MBS		
2012	Tōkyō Zenryoku Shōjo	Hotel Front	NTV	Episode 4	
2012	Kuroi Jū-ri no Hitomi Kuroki 2		NHK BS Premium		
2013	Kyūmei Byōtō 24-ji Dai 5 Series	Naotoshi Ando	Fuji TV		
2013	Special Drama: Chibi Maruko-chan	Hiroshi Sakura	Fuji TV		
2014	Roosevelt Game	Taichi Toyoka	TBS		
2014	Tokkō Jimuin Minowa	Sawada	YTV	Episode 1	
2014	Hanasaki Mai ga Damattenai: Dai 2 Series	Kenji Tsujimoto	NTV	Episode 1	
2015	Hatsumori Bemars	Kojima-sensei	TV Tokyo	Episodes 1, 8, 9, 11, 12	
2015	5-Ri no Junko	Kota Fukudome	WOWOW		
2016	Funassyi Tantei	Heisuke Hiratsuka	Fuji TV		
2016	Rinshō Hanzai Gakusha: Hideo Himura no Suiri	Homare Kido	NTV	Episode 3	
2016	Conte Rail: Tsumi to Koi	Nakata	NHK	Episode 6	
2016	Juken no Cinderella	Koichi Usami	NHK BS Premium		
2016	Yassan: Tsukiji-hatsu! Oishī Jiken-bo	Shoku saijin	TV Tokyo	Episode 2	
2016	Sanada Maru	Muroga Kyūdayū	NHK	Episode 49	
2019 - 2020	Kamen Rider Zero-One	Jun Fukuzoe	TV Asahi		
2020	Hanzawa Naoki	Shigeki Kasamatsu	TBS		

=== Films ===
Year	Title	Role	Notes
2008	Tokyo Sonata	Kobayashi-sensei	
2009	Kuhio Taisa	Koichi Takahashi	
2011	Guilty of Romance	Shoji	
2011	Me o Tojite Giragira	Odashima	(Note: Limited release in Human Trust Cinema Shibuya from 22 October to 11 November 2011.)
2013	Eiga: Nazotoki wa Dinner no ato de	Palladium Iswaran	
2014	Bannō Kantei-shi Q: Mona Lisa no Hitomi	Yuzen Kyan	
2015	Tobenai Kotori to Merry Go Round	Masao Haneda	
2015	Hero	Shigeyuki Yaguchi	
2016	Ushijima the Loan Shark Part 3		
2016	Night's Tightrope	Kazuki Ogura	
2017	Before We Vanish	Detective Kurumada	
2022	Akira and Akira		

=== Animated films ===
Year	Title	Role	Notes	Ref.
2016	Storks	Pigeon Toady	Japanese dub	

=== Internet drama ===
Year	Title	Role	Website	Ref.
2011	Me o Tojite Giragira	Odashima	Bee TV	
2012	Re: Dream		Bee TV	

=== Radio ===
Year	Title	Network
2008	Platon	J-Wave
2008	Bananaman no Banana Moon	TBS Radio
2010	Untouchable no Chicago Mango	TBS Radio
2012	Hiroiki Ariyoshi no Sunday Night Dreamer	JFN

=== Internet ===
Year	Title	Website
2012	Unjash Kojima no Konya wa Iji-ranaide!!	Niconico

=== Advertisements ===
Year	Title
2012	Nippon Telegraph and Telephone Flet's Hikari
2013	Toyota Ractis
2013	Recruit Zexy

=== Music videos ===
Year	Title	Role	Notes
2013	Gummy "Shinji teru..."	Takeshi	(Note: Recording work from the album Fate(s).)
2013	Misia "Shiawase o Forever"	Mori	

=== Live ===
Year	Title
2008	Unjash Kazuya Kojima Solo Conte Live Vol. 1 Tampin
