= Himura =

Himura (written: 日村) is a Japanese surname. Notable people with the surname include:

- Yūki Himura (日村 勇紀, born 1972), Japanese comedian

== Fictional characters ==
- Himura Kenshin, a character in the Rurouni Kenshin, and father of Himura Kenji in the story
- Himura Kenji, a character in Rurouni Kenshin, and son of Himura Kenshin in the story
- Himura Izumi, a character in the YA novel Ink and Bone by Rachel Caine
- Rei Himura, a character in My Hero Academia.
- Geten, a character in My Hero Academia.
