= Bananaman (comedy duo) =

Japanese comedy duo

- Bananaman (バナナマン)
- Employer(s): HoriPro com Universal D

Comedy career
- Years active: 1993–present
- Members: Osamu Shitara; Yūki Himura

Notes
- Same year/generation as: London Boots Ichi-gō Ni-gō, Ken Watabe (Unjash) (Shitara); Ninety-nine, Yoiko, Daisuke Miyagawa (Himura)

Bananaman (バナナマン) is a Japanese owarai comedy duo consisting of Osamu Shitara and Yūki Himura.

== Career ==
Shitara and Himura formed as a comedy unit in 1993 and debuted on stage in 1994. Himura had broken up with his previous partner and Shitara was working as the driver of the comedian Masayuki Watanabe, so they formed a duo after a friend introduced them. They concentrated on skit comedy, developing a theatrical style that emphasized verbal repartee.

In 2008, they came in second on the nationally televised annual King of Conte skit comedy contest. Up until then, Bananaman had concentrated on live performances and DVD releases, but afterwards began to appear more on television. Himura appeared on the most shows (19) of any comedian during the 2009 New Year's period, and the duo received their own show, Banana Fire, for the first time in April 2009. After that, they became the hosts of several other television shows, including Nogizaka tte Doko? and its successor Nogizaka Kojichū (with Nogizaka46), Banana-juku, and Why Did You Come to Japan?, in addition to appearing as regulars on other shows like Beat Takeshi's Unbelievable. Shitara and Himura also appear by themselves on various programs, with Shitara, for instance, hosting the live news program Nonstop!.

Bananaman have also appeared in acting roles on film and television (for instance, Shitara in Kakusho ~ Keishicho Sōsa 3 Ka). In the year 2012, Shitara appeared on more television programs than any other Japanese personality, appearing in 611 programs, 163 with Himura (Himura was ranked 12th with 428 television appearances). Shitara also led the rankings for the first half of 2013.

Bananaman are the "official older brothers" (公式お兄ちゃん) of the girl group Nogizaka46 and are said to support them like family. The duo are the hosts of Nogizaka's weekly late night variety show, Nogizaka Kojichū, and will occasionally mention the girls in their radio show, BananaMoon Gold. Many Nogizaka46 members also say they listen to Bananaman's radio show and follow their schedules. The two acts often appear in each other's events and regular shows.

== Members ==
- Osamu Shitara (設楽 統, Shitara Osamu), born April 23, 1973, in Minano, Saitama
- Yūki Himura (日村 勇紀, Himura Yūki), born May 14, 1972, in Hiroshima, and moved to Sagamihara, Kanagawa at the age of 3

== Television ==
Year	Title	Role	Notes	Ref.
1982 - 2014	Waratte Iitomo!	Tuesday Regulars		
2013 - Ongoing	Why Did You Come to Japan? (YOUは何しに日本へ?)	Hosts/MC	Narrated by Bobby Ologun	
2011 - 2015	Nogizakatte, Doko? (乃木坂って、どこ?)	MC	Broadcast every Sunday night at 24:00 JST	
2014 - Ongoing	Kiseki Taiken! Unbelievable (奇跡体験!アンビリバボー）	Regulars	Broadcast on Wednesdays, at 20:00 JST	
2014 - Ongoing	Bananaman No Sekkaku Gourmet!! (バナナマンのせっかくグルメ!!)	MC	Broadcast weekly on Sunday, at 20:00 JST	
2015 - Ongoing	Nogizaka Under Construction (Nogizaka Kōjichū 乃木坂工事中）	MC	Replaced the old Nogizakatte, Doko? time slot, now broadcast every Sunday night at 24:15 JST	
2019 - Ongoing	BananaSand (バナナサンド）	MCs with SandwichMan	Broadcast on Wednesdays, at 23:26 JST	

== Radio ==
Year	Title	Station	Notes	Ref.
2007 - 2010	BananaMoon	TBS Radio	Broadcast on Mondays, from 1am to 3am JST	
2010 - Ongoing	BananaMoon Gold	TBS Radio	Broadcasting on Saturdays, from 1am to 3am JST	
