= Arimura =

Arimura (written: 有村) is a Japanese surname. Notable people with the surname include:

- Akira Arimura (有村 章, 1923–2007), Japanese endocrinologist, physiologist and biochemist
- Haruko Arimura (有村 治子, born 1970), Japanese politician
- Kasumi Arimura (有村 架純, born 1993), Japanese actress
- Koji Arimura (有村 光史, born 1976), Japanese footballer
- Kon Arimura (有村 昆, born 1976), Japanese radio personality, film critic and film commentator
