= Takashi Yuasa =

Japanese lawyer and television personality

Takashi Yuasa (湯浅 卓, Yuasa Takashi, born on November 24, 1955 in Tokyo) is a Japanese lawyer (admitted in Washington D.C., but not in Japan) and television personality. He belongs to the Horipro (Hori Productions) talent agency.

== Profile ==
He attended Shirogane Elementary School and Azabu Junior and Senior High School, in Tokyo, and graduated from the Department of Law at the University of Tokyo in 1979. He claims to have graduated with "the top results ever achieved" in his department. He received an LL.M. from UCLA Law School in 1984.

During the sale of the Rockefeller Center in New York City, he acted as a lawyer for the Rockefeller family (however, he was not the head of the legal team). As a result of his efforts, he says, Mitsubishi Estate paid approximately 1.5 times the amount it planned for the land, and he received a large sum in return (the precise amount was not revealed).

His hobbies include dance and opera, and is often asked to sing. He participates in opera together with the pianist Ayako Uehara, the Art critic Yuki Yamashita (Tokyo Research Institute for Cultural Properties) and the actress Misa Uehara.

== Regular television appearances ==
- Hexagon II Quiz Parade!!|Quiz! Hexagon Konya wa quiz parade Quiz! Hexagon II (Quiz Hexagon! Tonight's a Quiz Parade! Quiz Hexagon II)
- Shimada kentei!! Kokuminteki senzai nōryoku test (The Shimada exam!! The National Potential Quotient Test)
- World records (Japanese TV program)|World records
- Cream Stew no tarirariraan (Cream Stew's Tallylallylaah)
- Do night
- Ichiban! Express (First Express!)
- Tokoro-san no gakko de wa oshiete kurenai sonna tokoro! (Tokoro's That Thing They Don't Teach You in School)

== Other specials and guest appearances ==
- Asa made nama terebi "Gekiron! Honto ni NO to ieru ka!? Nihon" (Live TV Till Morning) - "Fierce Debate! Can Japan really say No!?"
- Nōnai esute IQ sappli (Brain Makeover IQ Supplement)
- Odaiba Akashiya jō (Akashiya Castle, Odaiba)
- Waratte iitomo
- All star kanshasai (All Star Thanksgiving Festival)
- Zen'in seikai atarimae quiz (The Quiz Everyone Ought To Get Right)
- Tamori no Japonica Logos (Tamori's Japonica Logos)
- Sanma no Manma (Sanma and Manma)
- Gokigen yō (How Do You Do)
- Gachinko shichōritsu battle (All-Out Ratings Battle)
- Cocorico million kazoku (Cocorico's Family of a Million)
- Sekai maru mie! Terebi tokusōbu (The World Uncovered! TV's Special Investigators)
- Takeshi/Itsumi no Heisei kyōiku iinkai (Takeshi and Itsumi's Board of Modern Education)

== Books ==
- "Wall gai ban - sekai to nihon no yomikata - kongo jūnenkan naniga okiru ka" (Wall Street edition: Reading Japan and the world - What will happen in ten years' time?) - published by PHP Kenkyūjo
- "America ni ashita wa aru no ka" (Is there a tomorrow for America?) - published by PHP Kenkyūjo
- He has written many essays and commentaries for economics texts from the Nihon Keizai Shimbun and books related to the Nihon Keizai Shimbun.
- Computer Data Base Protection - The Impact of Japanese Legislative Developments on United States and Japanese Copyright Laws (in English)

1. 9 Fordham Int'l L. J. 191 (1985–1986)
