= Motomu =

- Gender: Male

Origin
- Origin: Japanese
- Meaning: Different meanings depending on the kanji used

Motomu (written: 求 or 元夢) is a masculine Japanese given name. Notable people with the name include:

- Motomu Azaki (安崎 求; born 1960), Japanese actor and voice actor
- Motomu Kiyokawa (清川 元夢; 1935–2022), Japanese actor and voice actor
- Motomu Toriyama (鳥山 求), Japanese video game director
