= Waratte Iitomo! =

Japanese variety show (1982-2014)

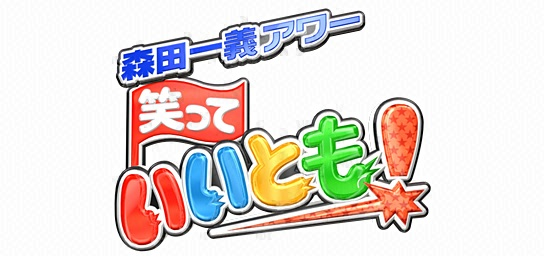
- Presented by: Tamori
- Starring: Yuki Nozawa (Noon Boyz); Yuma Sanada (Noon Boyz); A Series of Regular Members (see below)
- Theme music composer: Ginji Ito
- Opening theme: Uki Uki Watching
- Composers: Shiro Sagisu; Ginji Ito
- Country of origin: Japan

Production
- Producers: Takatoshi Hamano; Go Haruna; Shoichi Kuroki (chief)
- Running time: 58 minutes
- Production company: Fuji Television

Original release
- Network: FNS (Fuji TV)
- Release: October 4, 1982 – March 31, 2014

Morita Kazuyoshi Hour: Waratte Iitomo! (森田一義アワー 笑っていいとも!; Morita Kazuyoshi Hour: It's Okay to Laugh!) was a Japanese variety show aired every weekday on Fuji TV. The show was hosted by Tamori (Kazuyoshi Morita) and ran from 1982 to 2014. The show was produced in the Studio Alta building in Shinjuku, Tokyo. The show featured a series of regular members who only appeared on a particular day of the week. These regular members were changed periodically.

In October 2011, Johnny's Jr. members Yuki Nozawa and Yuma Sanada, known together as the "Noon Boyz", joined as the show's 16th "Iitomo Seinentai" team of assistants and dancers.

The final broadcast of the program took place on March 31, 2014 after over thirty-one years on the air. Guests appearing on the program's daily "Telephone Shocking" interview segment during the final week included Tetsuko Kuroyanagi, Beat Takeshi, and Prime Minister Shinzō Abe.

The show had 8,054 episodes making it the highest episode count in Japan, with 8001 of them hosted by the same presenter, quantity certified by Guinness World Records.

== Cast ==
As well as the long-running presenter (Tamori) and "Noon Boyz", the show featured certain regular members depending on the day of the week. As of August 13, 2013, these regulars were as shown below.

Monday	Tuesday	Wednesday	Thursday	Friday	Holiday regular
Shingo Katori (SMAP); Masakazu Mimura (Summers); Chihara Jr. (Chihara Kyōdai); Naomi Watanabe; Rino Sashihara (HKT48); Sō Takei	Masahiro Nakai (SMAP); Kazuki Ōtake (Summers); Osamu Shitara (Bananaman); Yūki Himura (Bananaman); Rola; Yū Sawabe (Haraichi)	Hikari Ōta (Bakushō Mondai); Toshi (Taka and Toshi); Taka (Taka and Toshi); Kanako Yanagihara; Louis Kurihara; Yūki Hirako (Alcohol and Peace) (Once a month); Kenta Sakai (Alcohol and Peace) (Once a month); Hiroyuki Iguchi (Wasteland) (Once a month); Futoshi Kōmoto (Wasteland) (Once a month); Satoshi Mukai (Panther) (Every other week); Takahiro Ogata (Panther) (Every other week); Ryōtarō Kan (Panther) (Every other week)	Shōfukutei Tsurube; Hironari Yamazaki (Untouchable); Becky; Yūji Ayabe (Peace); Naoki Matayoshi (Peace)	Tsutomu Sekine; Tsuyoshi Kusanagi (SMAP); Yuji Tanaka (Bakushō Mondai); Gekidan Hitori; Yukina Kinoshita; Kōsuke Suzuki (Once a month)	Fuku Suzuki

== Guinness World Record ==
This show received three Guinness World Record. On April 5, 2002, Tamori attended Waratte Iitomo's 5000th show, giving him the record for the longest continued hosting of a live television program. His record was recorded in the 2003 Guinness Book of World Records. On December 26, 2007, SMAP member Shingo Katori beat the previous record (9 s 50 ms) of consuming 500 ml of milkshake in 9 s 8 ms. However, on the show on that day, Toshi from the owarai duo Taka and Toshi beat his time by 0.02 ms. On March 31, 2014, Waratte Iitomo aired its final episode and Tamori renewed his world record for most live variety TV shows hosted by the same presenter at 8054 episodes.
