= Horipro =

Japanese talent agency

Horipro Inc.
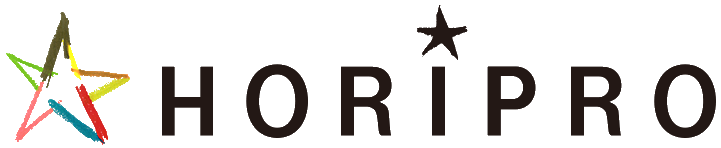
- Native name: 株式会社ホリプロ
- Romanized name: Kabushiki-gaisha Horipuro
- Formerly: Hori Productions (1960-1990)
- Type: Subsidiary
- Industry: Service industry (entertainment)
- Genre: Tarento, actors, actresses, musical artists, comedians, entertainment management, commercial and television production
- Founded: May 1960; 66 years ago
- Founder: Takeo Hori
- Headquarters: Ichome, 2–5, Shimomeguro, Meguro, Tokyo, Japan
- Area served: Japan
- Key people: Yoshitaka Hori (Chairman, CEO)
- Owner: Horipro Group Holdings
- Subsidiaries: Hori Agency; Horiprocom; Horipro Enterprise; Horipro International; Taiyo Ongaku
- Website: www.horipro.co.jp

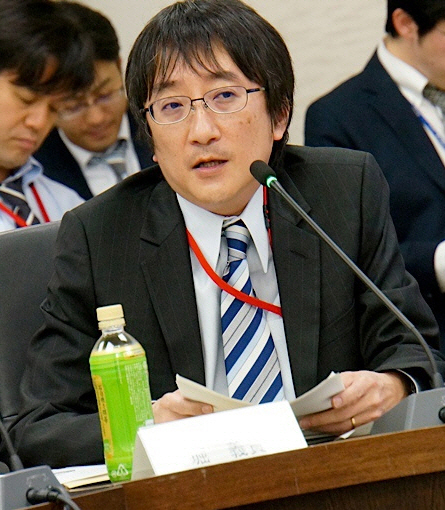
Yoshitaka Hori, the chairman & CEO of Horipro, on April 7, 2013

Horipro (株式会社ホリプロ, Kabushiki-gaisha Horipuro) is a Japanese talent agency that manages actors, entertainers and musicians, as well as commercial and television productions. It has locations in Nashville and Los Angeles in the United States.

== History ==
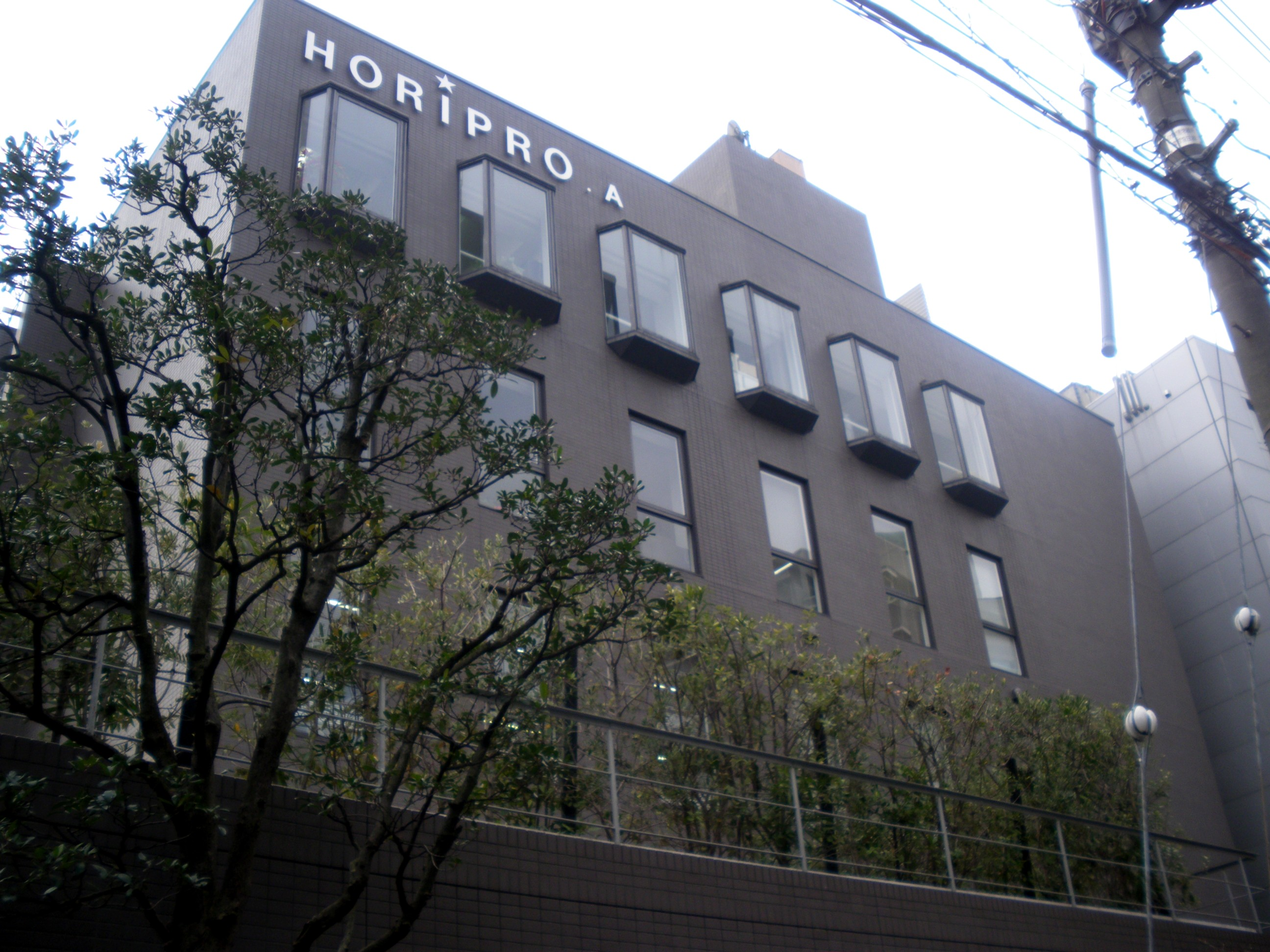
Former headquarters in Meguro.

It was founded in 1960 as Hori Productions (ホリプロダクション Hori Purodakushon) and changed to its present name in 1990.

In the 1970s, Hori Productions managed singer Momoe Yamaguchi.

In 1989, Horipro purchased the publishing assets of rock band Kiss. Next, the company moved on to invest in more catalogs. A year later, HoriPro Entertainment Group opened their first U.S. location in Nashville, Tennessee. Over the years, Horipro's songwriters would go on to write hits for country musicians.

In the late 1990s, Horipro planned to create a "virtual idol", an electronic rendition using motion capture methods of Kyoko Date. The virtual idol based on Date charted in Tokyo in 1996, and provided inspiration for the character of Idoru in William Gibson's eponymous novel.

In 2006, Horipro's first Los Angeles location opened. The company's catalog has expanded to include over 13,000 songs in each major genre. HEG's Los Angeles location is in partnership with Horipro Music Academy, a music enrichment school for children. Additionally, HEG Los Angeles began MusicTaste, a boutique artist development label that is placed within the publishing company. MusicTaste's artists include Matt Palmer and Dori Caymmi.

Horipro contracted with MediaHorse, an American music licensing and marketing firm, in 2015 for synchronization licensing in the United States. Horipro sold HoriPro Entertainment Group to Mojo Music & Media in 2019.

== Notable talents ==
=== Female talents ===
- Rika Adachi
- Kazu Ando
- Kei Aran
- Ineko Arima
- Haruka Ayase
- Minori Chihara
- Kyoko Date
- Kyoko Fukada
- Shoko Haida
- Minami Hinase
- Aya Hirayama
- Miyuki Imori
- Anna Ishibashi
- Haruka Ishida (former AKB48)
- Satomi Ishihara
- Tomomi Itano (former AKB48)
- Kazue Itoh
- Nagisa Katahira
- Tomomi Kasai (former AKB48)
- Yuu Kashii
- Ibuki Kido
- Haruka Kinami
- Erika Mabuchi
- Akira Matsu
- Akane Matsunaga
- Yurie Midori
- Ayame Misaki
- Karen Miyama
- Miho Miyazaki (former AKB48)
- Sae Miyazawa (former AKB48 -> SNH48 -> SKE48)
- Seira Nagashima (former Nogizaka46)
- Aoi Nakabeppu
- Mami Nakamura
- Chiharu Niiyama
- Yui Ninomiya
- Ayaka Ōhashi
- Ito Ohno
- Rin Okabe (former AKB48)
- Itsumi Osawa
- Mai Oshima (former AKB48)
- Ayana Sakai
- Ikue Sakakibara
- Hinako Sano
- Hitomi Sato
- Sheila
- Azusa Tadokoro
- Hitomi Takahashi
- Mitsuki Takahata
- Naho Toda
- Akiko Wada
- Suzuran Yamauchi (former AKB48 -> SKE48)
- Erii Yamazaki
- Yoon Son-ha
- Yuka
- Mio Yūki
- Nagisa Sekimizu
- Rin Aira
- Yuko Natori
- Yoshiko Nakada
- Yoko Kurita
- Yoshiko Tokoshima
- Mitsuko Oka
- Mayumi Oka
- Tomoko Fujita
- Hiyori Hamagishi (former Hinatazaka46)
- Aki Takajō (former AKB48 and JKT48)

=== Male talents ===
- Tsuyoshi Abe
- Motomu Azaki
- Bandō Minosuke II
- Chen Bolin
- Tatsuya Fujiwara
- Eiichiro Funakoshi
- Masachika Ichimura
- Sosuke Ikematsu
- Yuma Ishigaki
- Takeshi Kaga
- Ryo Kimura
- Kin'ya Kitaōji
- Gōki Maeda
- Tsuyoshi Matsubara
- Kenichi Matsuyama
- Akiyoshi Nakao
- Shunya Shiraishi
- Kenta Suga
- Kazuma Suzuki
- Ryohei Suzuki
- Shinji Takeda
- Ryoma Takeuchi
- Yoshitaka Tamba
- Satoshi Tsumabuki
- Shingo Tsurumi
- Yasutaka Tsutsui
- Asahi Uchida
- Jundai Yamada
- Kotaro Yoshida
- Hiroshi Katsuno
- Shinya Owada
- Toshinori Omi
- Satoshi Hashimoto

=== Comedians ===
==== Solo ====
- Hori
- Hikaru Ijūin
- Masanori Ishii
- Kick☆
- Ijiri Okada

==== Duo ====
- Bananaman (Osamu Shitara and Yuki Himura)
- Summers (Masakazu Mimura and Kazuki Ōtake)
- Speed Wagon (Jun Itoda and Kazuhiro Ozawa

=== Musical artists ===
- Aidan James
- Ami Wajima
- Atlantic Starr
- Ayumi Shigemori
- BEST FRIENDS!
- Fake? (through Music Taste)
- Fujioka Fujimaki
- Liyuu
- May'n
- Nano
- Shino
- Takumi Mitani

=== Athletes ===
- Sho Aranami (baseball player)
- Yukiya Arashiro (road bicycle racer)
- Yuichi Fukunaga (jockey)
- Shinjiro Hiyama (former baseball player)
- Junichi Inamoto (football player)
- Naoya Inoue (professional boxer)
- Takuma Inoue (professional boxer)
- Takeomi Ito (rugby player)
- Shinji Kazama (motorcyclist)
- Yusei Kikuchi (baseball player)
- Manabu Kitabeppu (former baseball player)
- Hirotoshi Kitagawa (former baseball player)
- Yu Koshikawa (volleyball player)
- Tomoaki Makino (football player)
- Karina Maruyama (former football player)
- Kenta Matsudaira (table tennis player)
- Kazutomo Miyamoto (former baseball player)
- Junichi Miyashita (swimmer)
- Takeshi Mizuuchi (former football player)
- Toshinori Muto (professional golfer)
- Motoko Obayashi (former volleyball player)
- Katsuya Kakunaka (baseball player)
- Kairi Sane (professional wrestler)
- So Taguchi (former baseball player)
- Hisanori Takahashi (former baseball player)
- Nobuhiro Takeda (former football player)
- Dai Takeuchi (football player)
- Yoshinori Tateyama (former baseball player)
- Yuichi Fukunaga (former jockey)

=== Others ===
- Kon Arimura (Film critic)
- Tatsuya Egawa (Manga artist)
- Péter Frankl (Mathematician, street performer)
- Fumi Hirano (Voice actress, essayist)
- Shimako Iwai (Writer, adult video director)
- Shoji Kokami (Playwright)
- Shinichiro Kurimoto (Economist)
- Ayako Nishikawa (Doctor)
- Takayuki Ohira (Engineer)
- Girolamo Panzetta (Essayist)
- Kosuke Takahashi (Journalist)
- Takashi Yuasa (Lawyer)
- Akiko Iwata (Journalist)
- Fusaho Izumi (Lawyer)

== Former Horipro artists ==
- Ryuji Sainei (left 31 December 2014)
- Kiwa Ishii (Announcer, left 31 July 2017)
- Misaki Momose (left 31 May 2018)
- Takurō Ōno (left 31 July 2019)
- Mariko Seyama (Announcer, left 31 January 2020)
- Suzuka Morita (former Idoling!!!, left 30 June 2020)
- Sei Ashina (died 14 September 2020)
- Daisuke Kikuta (left 30 September 2020)
- Sawa Suzuki (left 30 September 2021)
- Ryota Ozawa (left 30 November 2021)
- Yuka Ogino (former NGT48, left 31 May 2022)
- Miki Sato (retired 30 September 2022)
- Machico (left 30 November 2022)
- Ruriko Kojima (left 28 February 2023)
- Karen Iwata (former AKB48, left 30 June 2023)
- Shigeru Izumiya (left 31 August 2023)
- Yu Abiru (left 31 December 2023)
- Yuki Furukawa (left 6 April 2024)
