= Mayo Kawasaki =

Japanese actor and singer

- 川﨑 麻世
- Born: March 1, 1963 (age 63); Kita-ku, Kyoto, Japan
- Occupations: Actor, singer
- Years active: 1976 - present
- Agent(s): Office no Iri (until 2020); Platinum Production (2020-)
- Spouse(s): Carolyn Kawasaki (m. 1990; div. 2023) Kanon (m. 2024)
- Children: 2

Mayo Kawasaki (川﨑麻世, Kawasaki Mayo; born 1 March 1963, in Kita-ku, Kyoto, Japan) is a Japanese actor and singer. He grew up in Hirakata, Osaka. His father is former actor Jo Azumi. His wife is Carolyn Kawasaki.

== Filmography ==
=== Films ===
Year	Title	Role	Notes	Ref.
2023	Zom 100: Bucket List of the Dead			
2023	Hitch Hike	George		
2023	Fly Me to the Saitama: From Biwa Lake with Love	Mayor of Kyoto City		
2025	Shinpei	Tsubouchi Shōyō		
2027	Lita			

=== Television ===
Year	Title	Role	Notes	Ref.
2001	Hōjō Tokimune	Hōjō Nagatoki	Taiga drama	
