= Osamu Shitara =

Japanese comedian

- 設楽 統
- Born: 23 April 1973 (age 53); Minano, Saitama, Japan
- Other names: Kaiser (カイザー, Kaizā); Tensai Shitara-san (天才設楽さん); Osamu-chan (統ちゃん); Titara (ティタラ); Gobō-san (ゴボウさん)
- Education: Saitama Chichibu Agriculture and Technology High School
- Occupations: Comedian; actor; voice actor; television presenter
- Years active: 1993–
- Agent: Horipro Com
- Known for: Bananaman
- Style: Conte (boke)
- Television: Non Stop!; Crazy Journey; Asian Ace; –Sekai ni hitotsu– Miracle Recipe!; De kita de kita de kita
- Spouse: Unknown (m. 1999)
- Children: 2
- Awards: 2nd, 14th, 20th Ippon Grand Prix; 1st Language Yu-Gi-Oh The TV

Notes
- Same year/generation as: London Boots Ichi-gō Ni-gō; Ken Watabe (Unjash); Hitori Gekidan; Kazutoyo Koyabu; Hiroiki Ariyoshi

Osamu Shitara (設楽 統, Shitara Osamu; born 23 April 1973) is a Japanese comedian, actor, voice actor and television presenter. He performs boke (he does not entirely do boke he is known for doing tsukkomi) and tells stories in the comedy duo Bananaman. His partner is Yūki Himura. He is also a former Seibu Railway employee.

== Life and career ==
Osamu Shitara (設樂統) was born April 23, 1973, in Minano, Saitama as the youngest sibling of a brother and sister who are 6 and 3 years older respectively. He attended the Minano-chō Tachi Minano Middle School and was the president of the student council and the captain of the school baseball team. Shitara graduated high school in March, 1992 and found a job with Seibu Railway at the connection of his father who is a manager at Seibu Nagatoro Hotel, an establishment of the company. He worked at the Kotesashi Station on the Seibu Ikebukuro Line for 6 months before switching to other various part-time jobs and then finally becoming a comedian as a student of Masayuki Watanabe, whom he worked as a driver for.

In October, 1993, Shitara met up with three other rookie comedians in Shinjuku and formed a comedy group, Yūki Himura is one of them. However, after a few practice sessions, Shitara believed that a four man group would be limiting to their potential, and left with Himura to form what a comedy duo named Bananaman.

Shitara met his girlfriend when he was 19 at a part-time job and married her in 1999. They have 2 daughters as of 2019.

In the year 2012, Shitara appeared on more television programs than any other Japanese personality, appearing in 611 programs, 163 with Himura (Himura was ranked 12th with 428 television appearances). Shitara also led the rankings for the first half of 2013.

== Filmography ==
=== TV programmes ===
Informational–Variety shows
Year	Title	Network	Notes
2012	Non Stop!	Fuji TV	Presenter
2015	Crazy Journey	TBS	Presenter
Former
2007	Mucha-buri!	TBS	Voice
2008	Utsukushiki Aoki Do Now	TV Asahi	"Geinō-kai Ecology Chōsa"
2009	Nan demo Arita'!	goomo	
2009	Cine-tsū!	TV Tokyo	
2010	De kita de kita de kita	NHK-E	Voice (as Pace)
2010	Sakiccho	TV Asahi	
2011	Golentan	Fuji TV	
2011	Asian Ace	TBS	Presenter
2012	Choice	Fuji TV	
2013	–Sekai ni hitotsu– Miracle Recipe!	TV Asahi	Presenter
Television drama
Year	Title	Network	Role
1997	Joi wa Mite ita!	TV Asahi	
1998	Joi Mioko Hanabashi no Jiken Chart	TV Asahi	Takao's friend
1998	Kyoto o Miai Tour Satsujin Jiken 2	TV Asahi	Hiroyuki Yamaguchi
1998	Mayu no Misshitsu: Renzoku Satsujin Jiken	TV Asahi	Hiromichi Maejima
2005	Run Away Girl Nagareru Onna	BS Fuji	Erika's older brother
2006	Lion-Maru G	TV Tokyo	Ranmaru
2007	Tokkyū Tanaka 3-gō	TBS	Tomomi's father
2008	Rose:Time:Life	Fuji TV	Masakazu Ogino
2008	Yū Aoi×4Tsu no Uso: Camouflage	WOWOW	Tacchan
2008	Ryūsei no Kizuna	TBS	Shinji Hagimura
2009	Mr. Brain	TBS	Junichi Kanda
2009	Tsure ga Utsu ni Narimashite	NHK-G	Nojima
2009	The Waste Land	Fuji TV	Detective
2010	Hagane no Onna	TV Asahi	Toru Hasezaki
2011	Hagane no Onna Season 2	TV Asahi	Toru Hasezaki
2012	Saiko no Jinsei	TBS	Eiji Nagata
2012	Irodori Himura	TBS	Cafe Master
2013	Kakushō – Keishichō Sōsa 3-ka	TBS	Sugai Investigation 1st Department lieutenant
2015	Yōgi-sha wa 8-ri no Ninki Geinin	Fuji TV	Himself
Television animation
Year	Title	Network	Role
2015	Star Wars Rebels	Disney XD	Morad Smar

=== Films ===
Year	Title	Role	Notes	Ref.
2005	Hold Up Down	Police officer 3		
2008	Hitorimake	Father	Special appearance	
2010	Your Honor! How About a Little Leniency?	Tamotsu Nanba	First leading role	
2018	Okko's Inn	Kōsui Kanda (voice)		
2023	My Brother, the Alien	(voice)		

=== Japanese dub ===
Year	Title	Role	Notes	Ref.
2010	Space Buddies	Spudnick		
2011	Mars Needs Moms	Mylo's father		
2011	Happy Feet Two	Will the krill		
2015	Minions	Walter Nelson		
2016	The Secret Life of Pets	Max		

=== Stage ===
Year	Title	Ref.
2008	Jersey Man	

=== Advertisements ===
Year	Title	Notes	Ref.
1995	Taisho Pharmaceutical Co. Taisho Oriental gastrointestinal drug		
1996	Earth Chemical Bapona	Co-starring with Yoshimi Ashikawa	
1997	Aderans		
2000	Autobacs Seven Autobacs Cash Back Sale		
2009	Meiji Seika (now Meiji) Xylish		
2016	Zensho Holdings Sukiya		

=== Video games ===
Title	Role	Ref.
Doctor Lautrec and the Forgotten Knights	Jean Legrand	

=== Music videos, others ===
Year	Title	Notes	Ref.
2014	Noriyuki Makihara "Life Goes On –like nonstop music–"	Jacket photo	
