= Jun Itoda =

Japanese comedian (born 1972)

- 井戸田 潤
- Born: 13 December 1972 (age 53); Komaki, Aichi Prefecture, Japan
- Other names: Jun (じゅん); Itori (イトリ)
- Education: Aichi Prefecture Komaki Industrial High School
- Occupation: Comedian
- Years active: 1995–present
- Agent: Horipro Com
- Style: Tsukkomi
- Television: Current; Tokyo Ramen Komachi; Dodesuka!; Non Stop!; Kaiketsu! NiNi Answer; Onegai! Ranking; Hirunandesu!; Former; Arabikidan; Bakushō Red Carpet; Presat!; Emi Kamisama wa Totsuzen ni...; Shinobu Sakagami no Seichō Man!!; Arita no Yarashī...
- Height: 165 cm (5 ft 5 in)
- Spouses: Yumi Adachi (m. 2005; div. 2009); Ami Hachiya (m. 2022)
- Partners: Hiroki Sugino (Magnitude); Kazuhiro Ozawa (Speed Wagon)
- Father: Tomitaka Itoda (politician)

Jun Itoda (井戸田 潤, Itoda Jun; born 13 December 1972, in Komaki, Aichi Prefecture) is a Japanese comedian who performs tsukkomi in the comedy duo Speed Wagon. His partner is Kazuhiro Ozawa. Itoda is represented with Horipro Com.

== Life ==
Itoda's father is former City Council Vice Chairman from Komaki, Aichi Prefecture, Tomitaka Itoda. Itoda graduated from Aichi Prefecture Komaki Industrial High School. He shares a daughter (b. 2006) with actress and singer Yumi Adachi. The two got married in September 2005 and divorced in 2009.

== Filmography ==
=== Entertainment shows ===
Current regular programmes

Year	Title	Network
2012	Dodesuka!	NBN
2012	Non Stop!	Fuji TV
2013	Kaiketsu! NiNi Answer	NTV
2015	Idoleam! TV	CBC

Former regular programmes

Year	Title	Network
2011	Tokyo Ramen Komachi	KBS
2014	Nanairo Dream TV	CBC

Former quasi-regular programmes

Year	Title	Network
	Presat!	THK
2013	Emi Kamisama wa Totsuzen ni...	NTV

Other appearances

Year	Title	Network
2009	Arabikidan	TBS
	Bakushō Red Carpet	Fuji TV
2012	Quiz Miracle Farm	TV Asahi
2012	Jagaimon	Tele-Asa Channel
2013	Banana Juku	THK
2013	Style Plus	THK
2014	Shinobu Sakagami no Seichō Man!!	TV Asahi
2014	Arita no Yarashī...	TBS
2015	Hiroiki Ariyoshi no Daretoku!?	Fuji TV
2015	Onegai! Ranking	TV Asahi

=== One-off, specials ===
Year	Title	Network
2006	Tsukkomi Nihon Daihyō	TV Tokyo
2011	Yanyan Jump	TV Tokyo
2011	Shiawase no Kiiroi Koinu	CTV
2014	Ultraman Dash!!	NTV

=== Dramas ===
Year	Title	Role	Network
2006	Dermen's Walker	Kenji	TV Asahi
2007	Pinboke		Miranca
2007	Miru Papa: Shiawase no Zakka-ten		Miranca
2011	<See Eggs> Guts Pose! <Do! Shinya> "Cream Miyōshitsu"	National Taxation Bureau investigator (Marusa)	Fuji TV
2012	Meitantei Conan Drama Special: Shinichi Kudo: Kyoto Shinsengumi Satsujin Jiken	Ryuji Iwasaki	YTV
2013	Kakushō: Keishichō Sōsa 3-ka	Taiji Yanagida	TBS
2015	Replay & Destroy	"Mr. Daitai no koto wa Dekiru" Gaku Kazama	TBS
2018	Segodon	Katsura Hisatake	NHK

=== Internet dramas ===
Year	Title	Role	Website
2011	Zoku Kotodama no Onna-tachi.	Kenji	Lismo Channel

=== Films ===
Year	Title	Role
2007	JoJo's Bizarre Adventure: Phantom Blood	Wang Chan
2008	Hitorimake	Issei Jomori
2008	Kurenaino Sakazuki	
2013	Fumō Kaigi	Shoi Tsunayoshi

=== Stage ===
Year	Title	Role
2010	Akiko Wada Monogatari	Wada's initial manager
2012	Fuyū suru fit Shinai-sha-tachi	Dead Shinigami
2013	The Winds Of God –Ikiru Yyūki o Tsutaetai–	Kinta Fukuro / Lt. Fukumoto Takashi

=== Direct-to-video ===
Year	Title	Role	Ref.
2014	Space Sheriffs: Next Generation	Gamagon (voice)	

=== Television advertisements ===
Year	Title
2015	Nissin Chilled Foods Nissin no Futomen-shō Soba Hamburg Shishō

=== Music videos ===
Year	Title
2009	Otonamode "Sayonara wa sayonara"
2011	Shido "Itsuka"
2011	Waya! Uchuu Ichi no Osekkai Daisakusen

One-man live
Year	Title
2010	Ore wa Honō no Itoda Man! –Musha Shugyō no Maki–
2010	Ore wa Honō no Itoda Man! –Kikaku Live no Maki–
2011	Itoda Kikaku vol.1
2011	Itoda Kikaku vol.2
2011	Itoda Kikaku vol.3
2011	Itoda Kikaku vol.4
2011	Itoda Kikaku vol.5
2011	Itoda Kikaku vol.6
2011	Itoda Kikaku vol.7
2011	Itoda Kikaku vol.8
