= Yamagata dialect =

Japanese dialect spoken in Yamagata Prefecture, Japan

- Murayama dialect
- Native to: Japan
- Region: Yamagata
- Language family: Japonic: Japanese; Eastern Japanese; Tōhoku; Southern; Yamagata dialect

Language codes
- ISO 639-3: –
- Glottolog: yama1262
- IETF: ja-u-sd-jp06

The Yamagata dialect (山形弁, Yamagata-ben) is the local dialect spoken in Yamagata Prefecture, Japan. It is a form of Tōhoku-ben, and can be broken down into sub-regional branches that vary from area to area within Yamagata. Dialects in Yamagata Prefecture are roughly divided into two types: Inland and Shonai (coastal).

Yamagata-ben was used for comic effect in the Japanese film Swing Girls, 2004, to suggest that the film was set in a rural, 'backward' location. However, some Yamagata residents feel that the film used the dialect in an unnatural and patronising way. The dialect has also had Japan-wide exposure through Daniel Kahl, an American who has made a TV career as the gaijin talent who can speak fluent Yamagata-ben.
