= A Bolt from the Blue (film) =

- Poster
- Directed by: Gekidan Hitori
- Screenplay by: Atsuko Hashibe; Gekidan Hitori
- Produced by: Masaya Shibusawa
- Starring: Yo Oizumi; Kō Shibasaki; Hitori Gekidan
- Cinematography: Kosuke Yamada
- Edited by: Junnosuke Hogaki
- Music by: Naoki Satō
- Distributed by: Toho
- Release date: May 24, 2014 (Japan)
- Running time: 96 minutes
- Country: Japan
- Language: Japanese
- Box office: ¥1.18 billion (US$10.6 million)

A Bolt from the Blue (Japanese: 青天の霹靂, Hepburn: Seiten no Hekireki) is a 2014 Japanese comedy-drama film directed by Gekidan Hitori.

== Cast ==
- Yo Oizumi
- Kō Shibasaki
- Hitori Gekidan
- Takashi Sasano
- Morio Kazama

== Reception ==
The film was number-two on its opening weekend, behind Frozen, with ¥180 million. It earned a total of ¥1.18 billion (US$10.6 million) at the Japanese box office.
