= Kick (comedian) =

Japanese comedian and writer

- キック
- Born: Hisasi Kikuta; November 13, 1979 (age 46); Tokyo, Japan
- Occupations: Comedian, writer
- Years active: 2005 -
- Agent: Horipro
- Height: 1.78 m (5 ft 10 in)

Hisashi Kikuta (菊田 悠, Kikuta Hisashi; born November 13, 1979), better known as Kick (キック, Kikku; originally as KICK☆), is a Japanese comedian and writer who is represented by the talent agency, Horipro. He was born in Tokyo, and graduated from Toho Junior and Senior High School and Japan University of the Arts Faculty Department of Photography.

== Filmography ==
Year	Title	Network	Notes
	Onbato+	NHK G	
	Oha Suta	TV Tokyo	
	Disney Time	TV Tokyo	
	SRS	Fuji TV	
2008	Gold Rush 2008: Kotoshikoso wa Break Shitai Geinin ga Hiraku Atarashiki Iromonea no Yoake!!	TBS	
	Show Pan	Fuji TV	
	Shin Tokyo Hito no Sentaku	NHK G	
	Owarai Zukan Hamanuki	TVK	
2009	Ariken	TV Tokyo	
2011	Momo Kuro Chan: Momoiro Clover Z Channel		
2011	Dai! Tensai TV-kun	NHK E	
2011	Yari-sugi Cozy	TV Tokyo	
2012	Jagaimon	TV Asahi	
2012	Hideki Yamanaka no Asobi ni Majime	BS Fuji	
2013	Uchimura Summers	Miranca, E!TV Uchisama.com	
2013	Nichiyō Golden de Nani Yattenda TV	TBS	
2013	Zakkuri High Touch	TV Tokyo	
2014	Akko ni Omakase!	TBS	
2014	Chō mū no Sekai	TVN Next	
2014	King's Brunch	TBS	
2014	Sweet Den of Premiere	Fuji TV	
2014	Takeyama Rock n Roll		
	Special research police JUMPolice	TV Tokyo	
2015	Gogotama	TV Saitama	

=== Drama ===
Title	Network	Notes
Kiyoshiro Imawano Transistor Radio	NHK BS Premium	

=== Radio series ===
Title	Network	Notes
Kick no Occult Jinsei Sōdan-shitsu	FM Nack 5	

=== Internet series ===
Year	Title	Network	Notes
	Kick no 3-bu Kicking	Got it! - Garitto	
	Kick no Yase Thai Diet	Geinin1 Shūkan	
2009	Yuichi Utsu no Uchū Ichi Radio	OAS	Guest
2011	Moeyan no Arigatō go Jaimasu	Atsu! To Odoroku Hōsōkyoku	
	Kick no Psychic Channel	Nico Jockey	
