= Unbelievable (TV series) =

Japanese television series

Unbelievable (奇跡体験!アンビリバボー, Kiseki Taiken! Anbiribabō) is a Japanese variety/documentary TV show produced by Fuji TV, which began broadcasting on October 25, 1997. Currently, the program hosted by comedian duo Bananaman. It was previously hosted by Takeshi Kitano since its inception until March 2024.
