= Yumi Adachi =

Japanese actress and singer

- 安達 祐実
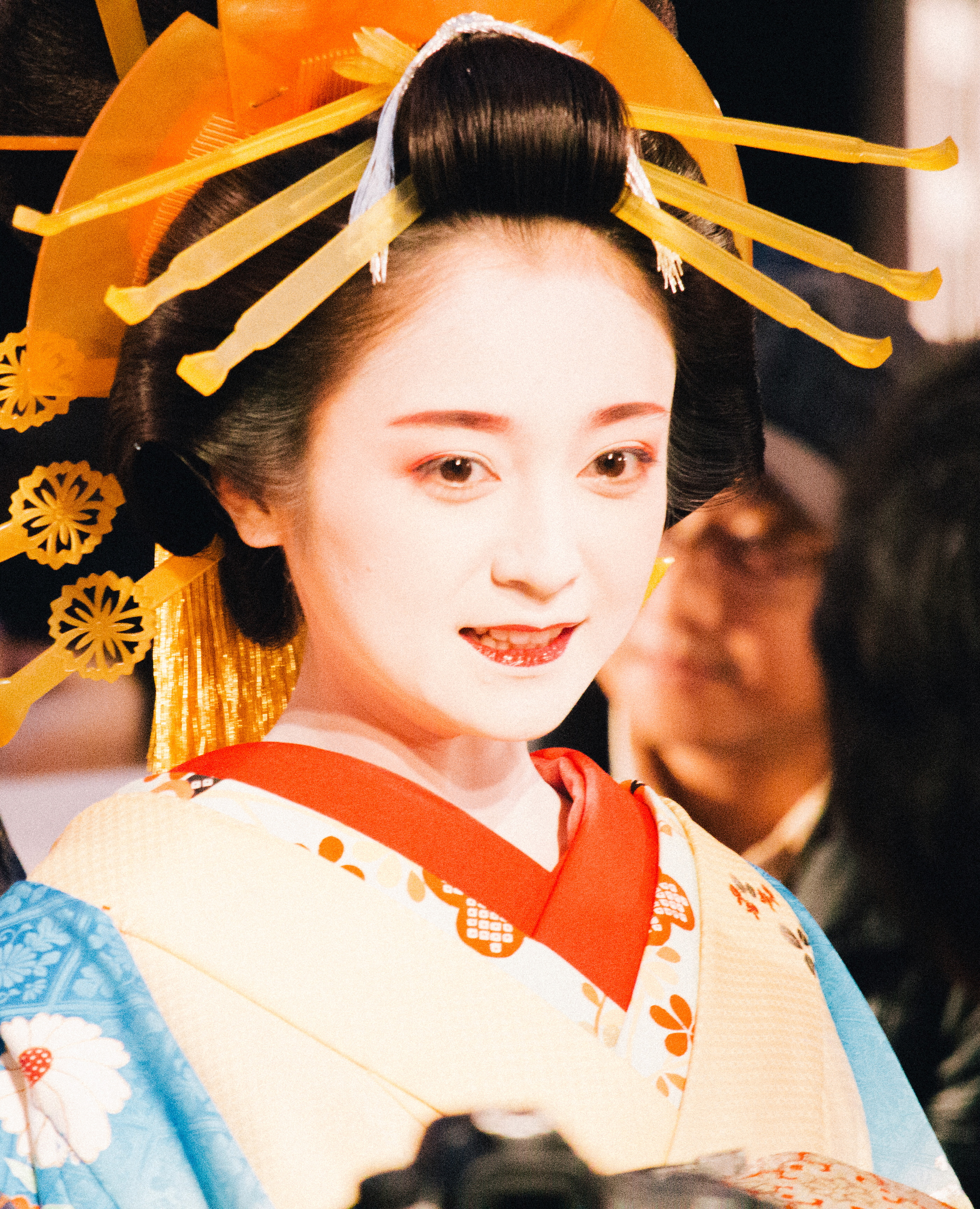
- Adachi at the 27th Tokyo International Film Festival in October 2014
- Born: 14 September 1981 (age 45); Taitō, Tokyo, Japan
- Education: Horikoshi High School
- Occupations: Actress; singer
- Years active: 1992–present
- Agent: Imilimi
- Spouses: Jun Itoda (m. 2005; div. 2009); Tomoki Kuwajima (m. 2014; div. 2023)
- Children: 2
- Musical career
- Genre: J-pop
- Instrument: Vocals
- Label: Victor
- Website: yumiadachi.com

Yumi Adachi (安達 祐実, Adachi Yumi; born September 14, 1981 in Taito, Tokyo) is a Japanese actress and singer.

== Biography ==
Adachi married comedian Jun Itoda of the comedy duo "Speed Wagon" in September 2005, they later welcomed their first child, a daughter, in May of the following year. The two announced their divorce in 2009.

In November 13, 2014, Adachi married photographer Tomoki Kuwajima. In February 2016, she announced her second pregnancy and Kuwajima's first child, and she later gave birth on 29 July of the same year. On December 28, 2023, Adachi announced on her official social media account that she had divorced her husband of 10 years.

== Filmography ==
=== Film ===
- Rex: A Dinosaur's Story (1993)
- Hero Interview (1994)
- Homeless Child (1994)
- Lupin III: Farewell to Nostradamus (1995)
- Kikansha Sensei (1997)
- Star Kid (1997)
- Ohaka ga Nai! (1998)
- Wakkanai Hatsu Manabiza (1999)
- The Boy Who Saw the Wind (2000)
- Tracing Jake (2004)
- Loft (2005)
- Go! Anpanman: Dolly of the Star of Life (2006), Dolly (voice)
- Mameshiba (2009)
- A Courtesan With Flowered Skin (2013)
- Seven Weeks (2014), Ayano Yamanaka
- Zenigata (2018)
- Usuke Boys (2018)
- #HandballStrive (2020), Ichikawa
- Suicide Forest Village (2021)
- The Way of the Househusband (2022), Shiraishi-sensei
- Downfall (2023), Karin Makiura
- Ice Cream Fever (2023), Ai Takashima
- Picture of Spring (2023), Fujimura
- #Mito (2023)
- My (K)night (2023)
- Schoolyard Sparkles (2023)
- The Crescent Moon with Cats (2024), Akari
- My Mom, My Angel: A Journey of Love and Acceptance (2024)
- Sai: Disaster (2026), Michiko
- The High School Family (2027), Hanae Yumiki

=== Television ===
- Gakkō ga Abunai (1992)
- Under the Same Roof (1993)
- Homeless Child (1994)
- Seiryū Densetsu (1996)
- Nurse no Oshigoto (1996)
- Glass Mask (1997)
- Genroku Ryōran (1999)
- Cinderella Doesn't Sleep (2000)
- Good Combination (2001)
- Ōoku (2003), Princess Kazu
- Dollhouse (2003)
- Yoi Ko no Mikata (2004)
- Tsumiki Kuzushi: Shinsō (2005)
- Shōfu to Shukujo (2010)
- Mother Game – Kanojo tachi no Kaikyuu (2015)
- Hajimete Koi wo Shita Hi ni Yomu Hanashi (2019), Miwa Matsuoka
- Suteteyo, Adachi-san (2020), herself
- Come Come Everybody (2022), Sumire Misaki
- A Day-Off of Ryunosuke Kamiki (2022), herself
- Ōoku: The Inner Chambers (2023), Matsudaira Sadanobu
- Oshi no Ko (2024), Yoriko Kichijōji
- Sai: Disaster (2026), Michiko
- Unbound (2025), Ritsu
- Plastic Beauty (2026)

=== Japanese dub ===
- Snow White: The Fairest of Them All (2002 re-release) (voice-over for Kristin Kreuk)
- Zombieland: Double Tap (2019) (voice-over for Zoey Deutch)

== Discography ==
=== Albums ===
- Love Peace (1994)
- Big (1995)
- Viva! America (1996)
- I Have a Dream (1997)
- Golden Best - Yumi Adachi - (2010)

=== Singles ===
- "Genki Dashite Boys & Girls" (1993)
- "Kaze no Naka no Dance" (1995)
- "Nigetai Toki wa" (1995)
- "Bokutte Manmaru" (1997)
- "Namida-kun Sayonara" (1999)

== Awards and nominations ==
Year	Award	Category	Nominated work	Result	Ref.
1994	17th Japan Academy Film Prize	Newcomer of the Year	Rex: A Dinosaur's Story	Won	
1995	4th TV Life Annual Drama Awards	Best Actress	Homeless Child	Won	
2024	78th Mainichi Film Awards	Best Supporting Actress	Picture of Spring	Nominated	
