= Kiwa Ishii =

Japanese free announcer (born 1977)

- 石井 希和
- Born: 26 December 1977 (age 48); Meguro, Tokyo, Japan
- Other names: Kiwa Shimada (real name)
- Education: Ferris University
- Occupation: Announcer
- Years active: 2000–
- Known for: TV Asahi announcer (2000–12); free announcer (2012– )
- Style: News; informational
- Television: ANN News; Yajiuma Plus; Kaiteki! Zubari; Chikyū marugoto TV; Tokyo MX News
- Spouse: Toru Shimada (m. 2007–2016)
- Relatives: Reiko Ishii (older sister); Kan Ishii (grandfather
- Website: Profile

Kiwa Ishii (石井 希和, Ishii Kiwa; real name Kiwa Shimada (島田 希和, Shimada Kiwa; née Ishii (石井)), born 26 December 1977) is a Japanese free announcer. She was an announcer for TV Asahi. She is currently freelance, having previously represented with Horipro.

== Filmography ==
=== TV Asahi career ===
Year	Title
2004	Kaiteki! Zubari
2006	Yajiuma Plus
	ANN News
News Access
Ohiru no News Access
Kiseki no Tobira! TV no Chikara
Adores na! Garage
Tonkomori
2009	Chikyū marugoto TV
2010	Eiga 'Doraemon: Nobita's Great Battle of the Mermaid King' Tettei Research Special
	Satappachi: Furutachi no Nihonjōriku
MomoClo Shiki Kengaku Guide: Momo Mi!!

=== After TV Asahi ===
Year	Title	Network
2015	Tokyo MX News	Tokyo MX

== Synchronised announcers at TV Asahi ==
- Chie Saburi
- Kensuke Sakurai
