= Kon Arimura =

Japanese radio host and film critic

- 有村 昆
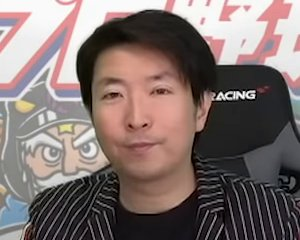
- From Tomoya Satozaki YouTube channel
- Born: Kon Fujimura; July 2, 1976 (age 49); Kuala Lumpur, Malaysia
- Other name: Arikon
- Occupations: Radio personality, film critic, film commentator
- Agent: Horipro
- Height: 1.70 m (5 ft 7 in)

Kon Fujimura (藤村 昆, Fujimura Kon; born July 2, 1976, in Kuala Lumpur, Malaysia), known for his stage name Kon Arimura (有村 昆, Arimura Kon) is a Japanese radio personality, film critic, and film commentator who is represented by the talent agency Horipro. He is nicknamed Arikon (アリコン). From 2012 to 2021, his wife was television caster Izumi Maruoka.

== Early life ==
Arimura was born in Kuala Lumpur, Malaysia in 1976. His father is the Vice President of Choice Hotels and served as a tourist journalist for Fujimura Nobe Sakana, and his mother was chanson singer Mariko Murasakikura.

Arimura got a degree Tamagawa University Faculty of Arts Theater Department, and graduated from the Tokyo Announcement Seminars.

== Career ==
He is mainly a radio personality, and is also a film commentator in magazines and television programs. Arimura was part of Bakademi Kyōkai which they are critics for B-movies. In recent years he is named Sid Arimura.

Arimura also appeared in many variety shows.

== Filmography ==
=== TV series ===
==== Current ====
Title	Network	Notes
King's Brunch	TBS	
Onegai! Ranking	TV Asahi	
Gems TV	Sky PerfecTV!	MC
Ariehen Sekai	TV Tokyo	Film commentator
Kaminuma Takada no Kugizuke!	Yomiuri TV	Panelist
J Tele Style	J:Com	Moderator

==== Past ====
Year	Title	Network	Notes
	Gekitō! Ore Gohan	Tōkai TV	Narrator
	Zeppin! Kodawari no 1-pin Ryōri no Meiten	Tabi Channel	Narrator
	Zatsugaku King	TV Asahi	Film commentator
	Yari-sugi Cozy	TV Tokyo	
	Check Time	Tokyo MX	Friday commentator
2013	Cream Quiz Miracle 9	TV Asahi	
	Movie@home: Tana o Irodoru Eiga-tachi	BS Fuji	Patron
2014	Ii Nikui Koto o Hakkiri iu TV	TV Asahi	
2014	High Noon TV Viking	Fuji TV	Thursday regular
	Gogotama	Saitama, Metropolitan Triangle	Film corner, then Thursday personality

=== Drama ===
Year	Title	Role	Network	Notes
2008	The Monster X Strikes Back/Attack the G8 Summit	Announcer		
2013	Chōzetsu Zekkyō Land	Yuni Egami	CBC	

=== Radio ===
==== Current ====
Title	Network	Notes
The Bay Line	Bay FM	Tuesday DJ
Yon Pachi 48 Hours: Weekend Meister	Tokyo FM	
Adult College	Nippon Cultural Broadcasting	

==== Current ====
Year	Title	Network	Notes
1999	Asa no Commuter Zone	Musashino FM	
2001	Sakigake! Eiga Juku	USEN	
2004	Pop Up Sunday	FM-Fuji	
	IR3 Japan		
	Menke-station	Aomori Broadcasting	
	J-Wave Cinema Sommelier	J-Wave	
2007	Bay Line 7300	Bay FM	Tuesday DJ
2008	Magical Snowland	Nack5	
	Bay Line Go!Go!	Bay FM	
