= Daniel Kahl =

American television personality

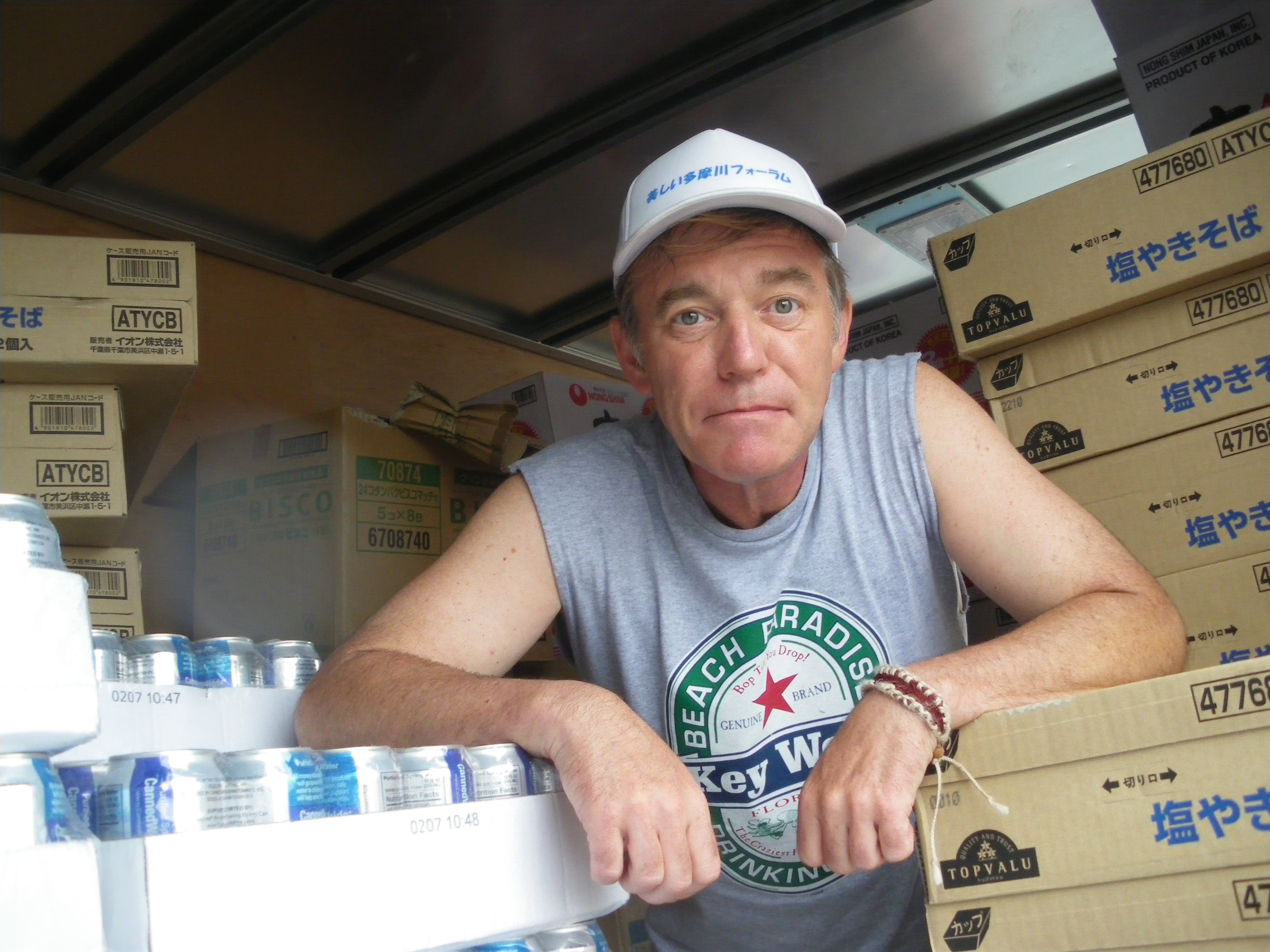
- Born: 30 March 1960 (age 66); Monrovia, California, United States
- Education: University of the Pacific
- Occupations: TV Personality; Tarento; Entrepreneur
- Political party: Republican
- Website: http://gree.jp/daniel_kahl/

Daniel Kahl (born March 30, 1960, in Monrovia, California) is an American foreign television personality (gaijin tarento) and entrepreneur in Japan. He is famous for speaking fluent Yamagata-ben, the dialect of Yamagata Prefecture, a predominantly rural area. He mainly works as a television reporter for human interest stories in Japan, such as travel and gourmet programs.

Following the 2011 Tohoku earthquake and tsunami in eastern Japan on 11 March 2011, Kahl was active in relief efforts in the affected areas, hauling food, supplies and equipment for fishermen. He also helped in combating the spread of false information regarding the spread of radiation in Fukushima after the nuclear accident there.
