= Gekidan Hitori =

Japanese comedian and actor

- 劇団ひとり
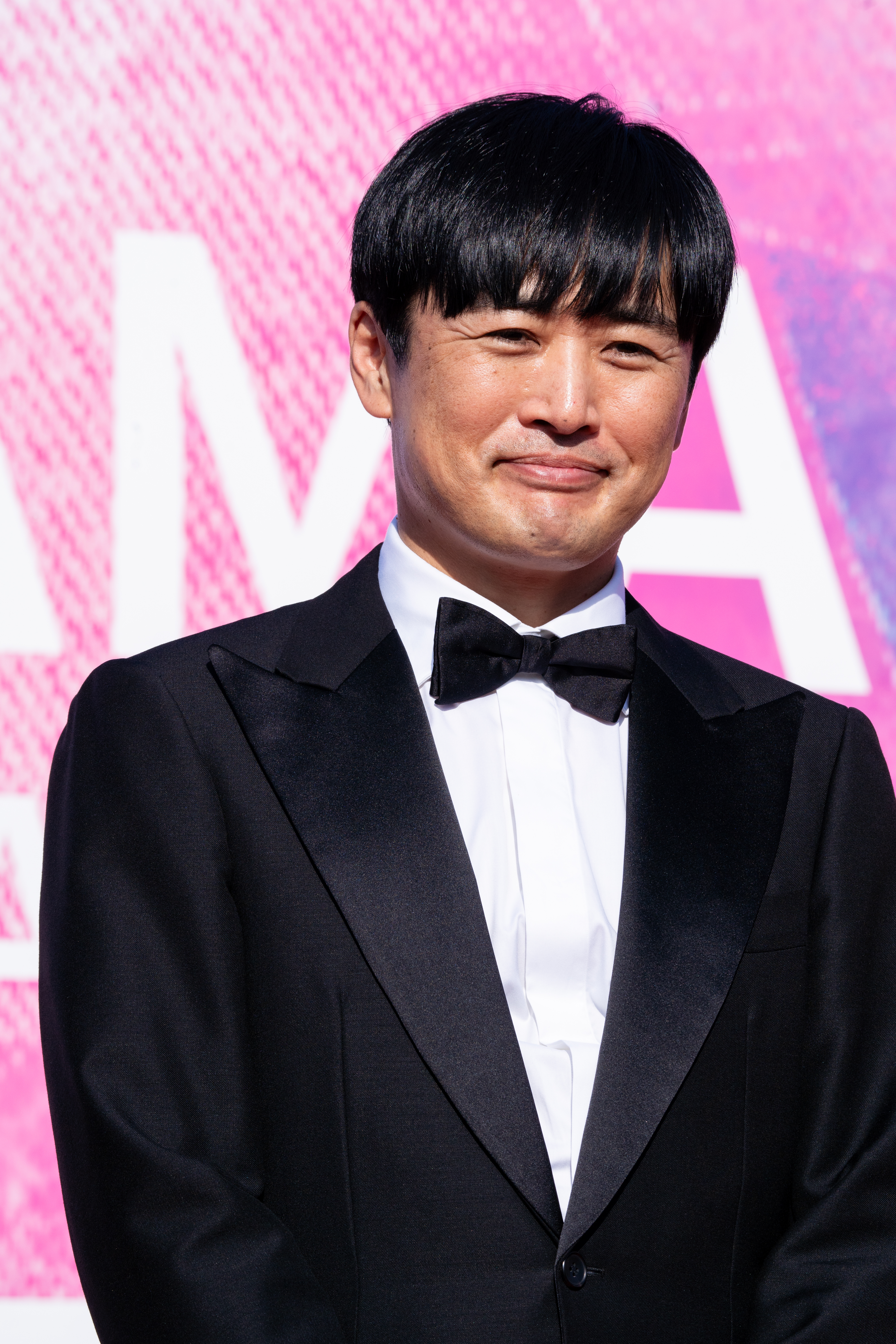
- Born: Shōgo Kawashima; 2 February 1977 (age 48); Chiba, Chiba
- Occupations: Comedian; lyricist; actor; novelist; film director
- Years active: 1994–present
- Agent: Ohta Production
- Notable work: Kagehinata ni Saku; A Bolt from the Blue
- Style: Conte
- Television: Current; Goddotan; Masahiro Nakai no Mi ni naru Toshokan; Shiawase! Bomber Girl; Former; Waratte Iitomo!; Richard Hall; Fake Off; Nekketsu! Heisei Kyōiku Gakuin; How to Monkey Baby!
- Spouse: Akane Osawa (m. 2009)
- Partner: Kazuhiko Akiyoshi (Soup Rix)
- Children: 3
- Relatives: Yuzo Kawashima (uncle, author); Keiji Osawa (righteous grandfather)
- Awards: Fountain Pen Best Coordinated Award (2006); Golden Arrow Award Broadcast Award – Variety; Elan d'or Awards Newcomer of the Year (2007)
- Website: Gekidan Hitori profile

Shōgo Kawashima (川島 省吾, Kawashima Shōgo; born 2 February 1977, in Hanamigawa-ku, Chiba, Chiba), known by the stage name Gekidan Hitori (劇団ひとり; 'one-person troupe') is a Japanese comedian, lyricist, actor, novelist, and film director.

Gekidan is mainly known his improvisational ability and for his style of physical comedy. He is represented with Ohta Production.

== Early life and career ==
Kawashima's parents were employed by Japan Airlines (his father was a pilot; his mother was a flight attendant). Due to the nature of their occupation, Kawashima lived in Anchorage, Alaska, for three years as a child, from second to fifth grade.

In 1992, while in his first year of high school, Kawashima appeared on the variety program Tensai Takeshi no Genki ga Deru Terebi!! and garnered the attention of Ohta Production to sign him as a comedy talent. He began activities in a kombi called "Suplex", but were relatively unsuccessful. Kawashima transferred and dropped out of high schools multiple times before graduating from Chiba Ritsufunabashi High School at the age of 20. He then went on to enroll in Tōhō Gakuen in Tokyo and specialized in broadcasting arts, graduating in 1999.

Kawashima's unit, "Suplex", disbanded in 2000 and Kawashima continued activities as a solo comedian with the name "Gekidan Hitori", which translates to "one-person troupe". After going solo, Gekidan became vastly more popular and successful in the industry, with numerous appearances in various television and variety programs. He continued to flourish in the following years, even becoming active as an actor in TV dramas and movies.

== Private life ==
His wife is tarento Akane Osawa, the two married in 17 February 2009 . They have three children, their first daughter was born in September 2010 and their first son was born in July 2016. They announced the birth of their third child, a daughter, born March 2019.

== Character ==
=== Name ===
When "Suplex" disbanded, Kawashima needed a new name to continue activities as a solo comedian. Initially, he set up an Internet voting poll with the top two names with the votes being "Katsu Curry" (カツカレー) and "Namiuchi Giwa Tachio" (波打際立夫), which translates to "The Shoreline People". Both were rejected by Kawashima's manager, stating that he "sees no future" for these names in the industry to succeed. During a chat with fellow comedian and script writer Kazuhiro Yasuda, when Kawashima asked Yasuda who is his favorite actor, Yasuda responded with Robert De Niro, but with bad pronunciation, which to Kawashima sounded like "Rohata de Nirō", which literally translates to "Niro from the Furnace", and sparked him to suggest the use of the name. This was, however, also rejected by his manager. Kawashima chose the name "Gekidan Hitori" in the end.

Gekidan Hitori is commonly referred to as Hitori or Kawashima by most others in the industry. Tamori, on the other hand, calls him Gekidan. His wife Akane Ozawa refers to him as "Shingo-tan".

=== Interests and Hobbies ===
- He is proficient with Rubik's Cubes, as he is able to solve a standard 3×3 cube in 42 seconds. On 30 July 2006, Kawashima entered the 2006 Tokyo Rubik's Cube Grand Prix and placed 68th out of 133 contestants.
- His favorite food is pizza. When asked what he last late on a TV program appearance, Kawashima said Domino's Pizza. Afterwards, he appeared as the face of a series of Domino's commercials in 2007 with their invitation.
- He is good friends with Going Under Ground, a Japanese alternative rock band. He also appeared in their music video for the single "Issho ni Kaerō" (いっしょに帰ろう) in 2009.
- He has publicly stated that he is a big fan of Christel Takigawa.
- As a student, Kawashima was a fan of Downtown, and purposefully imitated Hitoshi Matsumoto's hairstyle.

== Bibliography ==
Year	Title	Book code	Ref.
2006	Kagehinata ni Saku	ISBN 4344011023, ISBN 978-4344011021	
2008	Sono Knob wa Kokoro no Tobira	ISBN 4163696709, ISBN 978-4163696706	
2010	Seiten no Hekireki	ISBN 4344018753, ISBN 978-4344018754	
2010	Gekidan Hitori: Cappuccino o Nominagara	ISBN 978-4778312237	

== Filmography ==
=== Variety ===
==== Current appearances ====
Year	Title	Network
2005	Goddotan	TV Tokyo
2013	Shiawase! Bomber Girl	NTV
2013	Nakai Masahiro no Mi ni Naru Toshokan	TV Asahi
2016	Kyūkyoku no Maru Batsu Quiz Show!! Chō Toi! Shinjitsu ka? Uso ka?	NTV

==== Semi-regular (irregular appearances) ====
Title	Network
Ameagari Ketsushitai no Talk Bangumi Ame-Talk!	TV Asahi

==== Specials, one-offs ====
Year	Title	Network	Ref.
2012	Ariyoshi Hitori Tsuchida@Ryūheikai Presents! Chō Chō! Bureikōna Utage SP	NTV	
2013	Hiroiki Ariyoshi & Gekidan Hitori & Bibiru Ōki no Tensai Little	Fuji TV	
2013	Sekai ni Hokoru 50-ri no Nihonjin: Seikō no Iden-shi	NTV	
2014	Quiz Seikai wa Ichi-nen-go	TBS	
2015	BS Sk-Per! Tte Shittemasu ka!?	BS Sk-Per!	
2016	Geinin Cannonball	TBS	

==== Former, semi-regular ====
Year	Title	Network
	Satoko ime gusan	NTV
	Otona no Consommé	TV Tokyo
	Richard Hall	Fuji TV
	Heisei Kyōiku 2005 Yobikō	Fuji TV
	Honnō no High Kick!	Fuji TV
	Fake Off: Kanzen naru Sōkan-zu	Fuji TV
	Yancha Mokushiroku	TV Tokyo
	You-Yū-Kibun: Doyōda! Pyon	NBS
	The M	NTV
	Gekidan Hitori 5 Minutes Performance	BS Fuji
	Kaitai-Shin Show	NHK-G
	Manaberu!! News Show!	TV Asahi
	Kanbai Gekijō	TV Asahi
	Gekidan Hitori no Shin Bangumi o Kangaeru Kaigi	TV Asahi
2004	Yaguchi Hitori	TV Asahi
2006	Nekketsu! Heisei Kyōiku Gakuin	Fuji TV
2006	Waratte Iitomo!	Fuji TV
2006	Waratte Iitomo! Zōkan-gō	Fuji TV
2007	Ima sugu Tsukaeru Mame Chishiki: Quiz Zatsugaku-ō	TV Asahi
2009	Moraeru TV!	TV Asahi
2009	Chikyū-gō Shokudō: Eco meshi Sengen	TV Asahi
	How to Monkey Baby!	Tokyo MX
2010	Sōdatta no ka! Akira Ikegami no Manaberu News	TV Asahi
2011	Star Draft Kaigi	NTV
2011	Uretrho Mi Kakunin Shōjo	TV Asahi
2011	Yume! Dōbutsu Daizukan	TBS
2011	5 Men Tabi	NTV
2011	Yoppara Future Game Battle	TBS
2011	Masahiro Nakai no Ayashī Uwasa no Atsumaru Toshokan	TV Asahi
2011	Nan demo World Ranking Nep & Imoto no Sekai Banzuke	NTV
2012	Gekidan Hitori & Bibiru Ōki no "Doko Iku!?"	Fuji TV One Two Next
2012	Gyōkai Top News	TV Asahi
2012	Gachigase	NTV
2012	Yoruben	TBS
2012	Urethro Mikansei Shōjo	TV Tokyo
2012	Kai Nō! Maji karu Hatena	NTV
2012	Gekiron! Doxchi Mania	TV Asahi
2013	Acchi Mania	TV Asahi
2014	Urethro Mi Taiken Shōjo	TV Tokyo
2014	OV Kantoku	Fuji TV
2014	Omokuri Kantoku: O-Creator's TV show	Fuji TV
2015	Kasetsu Collector Z	NHK BS Premium
2016	Urero Bugendai Shōjo	TV Tokyo

==== Other appearances ====
Year	Title	Network
	Ucchan Nanchan no Honō no Challenger korega dekitara 100 Man-en! !	TV Asahi
	Cosmo Angel	THK, BS Fuji
	Future Girls	THK
	Warai no Kin Medal	ABC
	Enta no Kamisama	NTV
	Bakushō on Air Battle	NHK
	Lincoln	TBS
2007	Gekidan Hitori no Takumi Tanbō-ki	Fuji TV 721
2011	Hisai-chi ni Ikiru! Kodomo-tachi no Tatakai 193-nichi Kiroku	Fuji TV
2015	The Hakugaku	TV Asahi
2016	Darake! Okane o Haratte demo Mitai Quiz	BS Sk-Per!

=== TV dramas ===
Year	Title	Role	Network	Ref.
2003	Tokyo Love Cinema		Fuji TV	
2003	Stand Up!!	Hiromi Tachibana	TBS	
2004	X'smap: Tora to Lion to Go-ri no Otoko	Middle-aged Santa	Fuji TV	
2005	Mahora no Hoshi	Takeshi Kita	YTV	
2005	Densha Otoko	Yusaku Matsunaga	Fuji TV	
2005	Densha Otoko: Mōhitotsu no Saishūkai Special	Yusaku Matsunaga	Fuji TV	
2006	Junjō kirari	Naoto Saito	NHK-G	
2006	Dare Yorimo Mama o Ai su	Yamashita	TBS	
2006	Densha Otoko DX: Saigo no Seisen	Yusaku Matsunaga	Fuji TV	
2006	Kazoku: Tsuma no Fuzai-Otto no Sonzai	Hitoshi Tsuno	ABC, TV Asahi	
2007	First Kiss	Shido First Priest	Fuji TV	
2007	Kyonen Renoir de	Yankee Huband	TV Tokyo	
2007	Suwan no Baka! Kozukai 3 Man-en no Koi	Kenji Kamo	KTV	
2008	Avelegi	Atsushi Abe	Fuji TV	
2008	K-tai Investigator 7	Yoshiki Kashiwagi	TV Tokyo	
2008	81diver	Jiro Mojiyama	Fuji TV	
2008	Maō	Nori Serizawa	TBS	
2008	Avelegi 2		Fuji TV	
2008	Ware wa Gogh ni naru! Ai o Hotta Otoko-Munakata Shikō to sono Tsuma	Shikō Munakata	Fuji TV	
2008	"Hahakoihi no Ki": Junichirō Tanizaki "Shōshōshigemoto no Haha" yori	Shigeru Fujiwara	NHK	
2009	Chance! Kanojo ga Seikō shita Riyū	Mikio Inoue	Fuji TV	
2009	Sayayoi Zakura	Hirofumi Izumi	Fuji TV	
2009	Kochira Katsushika-ku Kameari Kōen-mae Hashutsujo	Torajiro Kanda	TBS	
2010	Hebi no hito		WOWOW	
2010	10-Nen-saki mo Kimi ni Koishite	Hidaka	NHK	
2010	Sayonara, Alma: Akagami o moratta Inu		NHK	
2013	Nagasawa-kun	Nagasawa-kun	TBS	
2015	Hana Moyu	Itō Hirobumi	NHK	
2015	Kekkon ni Ichiban Chikakute Tōi Onna	Okasaki Shop owner	NTV	
2016	Montage: San Oku-en Jiken Kitan	Yasunari Suzuki	Fuji TV	
2016	The Sniffer	Hideo Numata	NHK-G	
2018	Segodon	John Manjirō	NHK	
2024	Hanasaki Mai Speaks Out 2024	Naoki Hanzawa	NTV	

=== Anime television ===
Title	Network
Bean World	Fuji TV 721

=== Films ===
Director

Year	Title	Notes	Ref.
2014	A Bolt from the Blue	Also writer	
2021	Asakusa Kid	Also writer	

Writer

Year	Title	Notes	Ref.
2016	Crayon Shin-chan: The Movie – Fast Asleep! The Great Assault on the Dreaming World		

Actor

Year	Title	Role	Notes	Ref.
2004	The Neighbor No. Thirteen			
2006	Memories of Matsuko	Takeshi Okano		
2006	7 Tsuki 24-nichi-dōri no Christmas			
2007	Dororo			
2007	Bubble Fiction: Boom or Bust			
2008	Paco and the Magical Book			
2008	Ikigami: The Ultimate Limit			
2010	Golden Slumber	Kazuo "Kaz" Ono		
2011	Rebirth	Takashi Kishida		
2011	Share House			
2012	The Wings of the Kirin	Akira Itsukawa		
2012	Fuse Teppō Musume no Torimonochō	Sekiro Seki (voice)		
2013	Goddotan: Kiss Gaman Senshuken – The Movie	Shogo Kawashima		
2014	A Bolt from the Blue	Shotaro Toru		
2014	Goddotan: Kiss Gaman Senshuken – The Movie 2: Psychic Love	Shogo Kawashima		
2014	Miracle: Debikuro-kun no Koi to Mahō	Devil Claus (voice)		
2025	Broken Rage			

=== Animated films ===
Year	Title	Role	Ref.
2006	Doraemon: Nobita's Dinosaur 2006	Uncle, Housewife A, Recycling Contractor, Newscaster, Time Patrol Secretary	
2007	Strings	Erito (Japanese dub)	
2010	Coraline	Black cat (Japanese dub)	
2010	Shrek Forever After	Rumpelstiltskin (Japanese dub)	
2011	Happy Feet Two	Mumble (Japanese dub)	
2015	Chibi Maruko-chan: A Boy from Italy	Shin	

=== Radio programmes ===
Current

Title	Network
Gekidan Samba Carnival	FM Fuji

Former

Title	Network
Jungle Paradise	FM Fuji
All Tegami Nippon	Japan Post internet radio

=== Advertisements ===
Year	Title	Ref.
2005	20th Century Fox Home Entertainment 24 Season III DVD Collectors Box	
	Aderans	
	Life Card "Phishing Sagi ni Kiwotsukete!"	
	Outsourcing	
2006	Meiji Seika "Xylish Show"	
2006	Pioneer Corporation "Cyber Navi"	
2006	Daiwa House "Dee Room"	
2006	NTT DoCoMo Kara Watashi wa DoCoMo desu "Gekidan Hitori – Kara Watashi wa DoCoMo desu"	
2007	Sapporo Brewery "Hanjō-ten"	
2007	PlayStation Portable Monster Hunter Freedom Unite	
2007	Lion Corporation Top Fūai-kan	
2007	Domino’s Pizza "Domino tomaranai"	
2007	Japan Post Holdings "Nenga Campaign"	
2008	Asahi Soft Drinks Citrulline Water "Citrulline Tōjō", "Slider Asa", "Slider Furo"	
2008	Mazda Biante "Contrast", "Nobi nobi", "Shijō Kokuchi"	
2008	Aflac "Ahiru Hoken Sōdan: Hitori-san"	
2008	NTT DoCoMo "Answer House Tōjō", "4Tsu no Heya"	
2009	Otsuka Pharmaceutical CalorieMate	
2009	2009 Tokyo prefectural election	
2009	Kao Corporation Essential	
2015	Sanyō Shokuhin Sapporo Ichiban Curry Ramen	
2015	Sega Phantasy Star Online 2	
2016	U-Can Tsūshin Kōza	
2016	Asahi Soft Drinks Wonda Morning Shot "Tezukuri Seal"	

== Serials ==
Title
Quick Japan
TV Station
Shūkan Bunshun
Yomiuri Shimbun

=== Video games ===
Year	Title	Role
2005	Heavy Metal Thunder	Go Shimokitazawa

=== Stage ===
Year	Title
2005	Atami Satsujin Jiken
2006	Usukawa Ichi-mai
2013	Butai Urethro Mi Kōkai Shōjo
2015	Tokyo 03 Frolic A Holic Love Story "Tori-gaeshi no tsukanai Sugata"

=== DVD ===
Year	Title
2004	Tokai no Napoleon
2006	Tokai no Shakespeare
2008	Gekidan Hitori no Takumi Tanbō-ki
	Gekidan Hitori: Mukūkan 1DK – One Dream Keeper
Kanbai Gekijō Series
Kanbai Chika Gekijō
Tokyo Chōnenten Series

=== Music videos ===
Title
Tokyo Jihen "Koi wa Maboroshi for musician (Haishin Gentei Track)"
Tokyo Jihen "Kabuki (album Adult Shūroku)"
Ketsumeishi "Deai no kakera"
Going Under Ground "Issho ni Kaerou"
