= Shinji Kazama =

Japanese motorcyclist (born 1950)

Shinji Kazama (born 26 September 1950) is a Japanese motorcyclist who rode to the North and South Poles on motorcycles. He is shown in the documentary television series Pole to Pole (1992), presented by Michael Palin, when he and Palin happened to be on the same flight to Patriot Hills Base Camp.

As of 2010, Kazama was the only person to have reached both poles on a motorcycle. He reached the North Pole on 21 April 1987, and the South Pole on 3 January 1992. Kazama's trip to the South Pole set an overland speed record for the journey (24 days) which stood until 2005. He also set records for elevations reached on Mount Everest (5,880 metres (19,290 ft) in 1985, 6,005 metres (19,701 ft) in 1986), Mount Kilimanjaro and Mount Fuji by motorcycle. In 1982, Kazama became the first Japanese national to finish the Dakar Rally. He won the Dakar Rally in the 500cc class in 1984. In 1987 he won the Rallye des Pharaons in the 250cc class.

In 2004, while again participating in the Dakar Rally, Kazama was struck by a big rig, mangling his left leg. He was flown to a hospital in Paris, where the leg was saved, but Kazama was left reliant on a cane to walk. In 2007, Kazama was appointed a goodwill ambassador for the United Nations World Health Organization "Bone and Joint Decade" (2000-2010). In the same year, Kazama undertook The Trans Eurasian Continent Tour, covering 11,250 miles (18,110 km) (from Vladivostok to Cabo da Roca, Portugal) in 52 days. In 2008 and 2009, Kazama drove a Subaru Forester from Alexandria, Egypt, to Cape Town, South Africa, to promote the Bone and Joint Decade. In 2009, he traversed Australia. From May to September 2010, Kazama and three other physically disabled riders journeyed from the South Pole to the North Pole using motorcycles, bicycles, dog sleds and boats, starting off from the southern tip of Chile and finishing in Lund, Sweden.
