= Bobby Ologun =

Japanese mixed martial arts fighter

Bobby Ologun ボビー・オロゴン
- Born: Alaji Karim Ologun; April 8, 1966 (age 60); Ibadan, Nigeria
- Other names: Bobby
- Nationality: Japanese
- Height: 6 ft 1 in (1.85 m)
- Weight: 215 lb (98 kg; 15.4 st)
- Division: Heavyweight
- Style: Kickboxing
- Fighting out of: Saitama, Japan
- Team: Team Ologun; Grabaka

Kickboxing record
- Total: 1
- Wins: 0
- Losses: 1

Mixed martial arts record
- Total: 5
- Wins: 3
- By submission: 1
- By decision: 2
- Losses: 2
- By knockout: 2

Other information
- Notable relatives: Andy Ologun (brother)
- Mixed martial arts record from Sherdog

Bobby Ologun (Japanese: ボビー・オロゴン, Hepburn: Bobī Orogon; born Alaji Karim Ologun on April 8, 1966) is a Nigerian-born Japanese television personality and mixed martial artist. In Japan, he is known simply as Bobby (ボビー). He speaks English, Yoruba and Japanese. He lives in Saitama, Saitama Prefecture. On July 26, 2007, he announced on Mezamashi TV that he had become a naturalized citizen of Japan, taking his wife's surname and registering officially as Bobby Konda (近田 ボビー, Konda Bobī).

== Early life ==
Ologun is the third brother in a family of thirty-one brothers and sisters. After graduating from the University of Nigeria, Nsukka, he came to Japan as an assistant to a trading company which his father manages. In 2001, he worked a part-time job in the kitchen of a cafe in Daikanyama, Shibuya, while also first appearing in Sanma Akashiya's television program Sanma's Super Karakuri-TV on Tokyo Broadcasting System as a non-Tarento interviewee. By the end of the year, he was regular on the popular skits featured on Karakuri-TV, The Funniest Language School, as a student.

== Comedy style ==
Foreigners who have trouble speaking Japanese are often featured in Japanese variety shows, which may explain the immediate success of Ologun. His frequent confusion (or feigned confusion) quickly made him an instant star on the Karakuri-TV show.

Some of his famous mistakes were:

- Called the famous diviner Kazuko Hosoki, Usagi-sensei (Rabbit teacher) instead of Hosoki-sensei on her TV show.
- Confused tensai (genius) with hentai (pervert).
- Rearranged Ayumi Hamasaki's name into Amaguri Kayumi" (Itchy Sweet-chestnut). However, the Amaguri could have been a switchout for Hamaguri which is a type of clam that is symbolic of the vulva in Japanese culture (it is common to switch taboo words for their closest spelled or phonetic equivalent in Japanese entertainment), hence the lasting novelty of the gaffe. He is supposedly a fan of Hamasaki.
- Routinely mistook Kinchō (nervous) with Kanchō (enema).

Ologun also stands out for using politically incorrect, racially-charged humor, often capitalizing on stereotypes of African Americans. He and fighting celebrity Bob Sapp were criticized for the perceived racism on their performances, but they defended it as part of the Japanese's cultural views towards humor. Ologun and Sapp were reportedly hugely popular among African people living in Japan.

He used to work as the narrator for You wa Nani Shi ni Nippon e (YOUは何しに日本へ) until 2020.

== Fighting origins and records ==
One of the running skits on Sanma's Super Karakuri TV featured Ologun attempting a variety of different jobs and skills in which he had no previous experience (he succeeded Tamao Nakamura in these skit performances). Inspired from watching Bob Sapp vs Tarō Akebono on K-1 Dynamite!! on New Year's Eve in 2003, Ologun tried judo on Karakuri-TV. Karakuri-TV's emcee, Sanma Akashiya (who had previously watched a VTR of Ologun struggling in the martial art and half-jokingly said, "Bobby might be able to take part in a combat sport event at the end of the year."), in reference to the New Year's Eve supershows put on by K-1, PRIDE, and Antonio Inoki's now defunct BOM-BA-YE promotion. As a result, he tried various full contact combat sports on the program.

By February 2004, he was initiated into the Pancrase stable, "GRABAKA" and studied under its founder, Sanae Kikuta. In March of that same year, he experienced a sparring match with MMA and Jiu-Jitsu legend Royce Gracie. He lost, but Ologun performed better than expected, as he was able to cut Gracie and make him bleed from his forehead. In a joke turned reality, he faced French kickboxer Cyril Abidi in K-1 Dynamite!! at the Osaka Dome on December 31, 2004. Billed as "The World's Most Dangerous Newcomer", Ologun won by three-round decision, and scored a surprise victory. This match was the only pure MMA rules bout on that night's card, giving Ologun a slight advantage due to his training and the fact that his opponent, while an accomplished kickboxer, wasn't prepared for MMA style fighting. Abidi was a last minute addition to the fight, Ologun's original opponent Mike Bernardo had to withdraw due to an injury. Additionally, there was confusion to the rule system of the bout as the captions showed it to be the general kickboxing rules but ended up as an MMA contest. Abidi was admonished for actions Ologun was doing repeatedly in the fight, such as mounted punches, which led fighting pundits to believe the fight was fixed. Abidi himself hinted the fight was fixed in a post fight interview. The Japanese media, which focused quite a bit of time on fighting events such as K-1 and PRIDE, soon dubbed Ologun Saikyō no Shirōto (The Strongest Amateur).

Ologun's next fight was against former Yokozuna, Akebono at K-1 Dynamite!! on New Year's Eve 2005. Akebono, who had a fighting record of 1-9 entering the fight, fiercely attacked Ologun in the first and second rounds. However, Ologun steadily fought his way to another three-round decision.

His next fight was a kickboxing match in Sapporo at K-1 Revenge on July 30, 2006, where he fought Asian GP champion Yusuke Fujimoto. Ologun earned the ire of the referee with unsportsmanlike conduct as he tripped and pushed over Fujimoto repeatedly, trying to punch at him afterward, and going for sucker punches after gesturing for a break, all of which led to a yellow card. At the end of the 3rd round, he tripped Fujimoto one last time and then stood over him in an unsportsmanlike fashion. Added to the knockdown he suffered in the first round, he lost his first fight and his first under K-1 rules by unanimous decision.

At K-1 Dynamite, New Year's Eve 2006, during the K-1 HERO'S was set face the 7'2", 360 lb. Choi Hong-man. Choi, on the Hero's website, warned Ologun about his in-ring behavior, saying (in Japanese), "Bobby had better grow up.", and, "If he makes me mad, he's going to the hospital.". In the subsequent fight, Ologun immediately tried a flying kick to Choi's head, but missed. This allowed Choi to capitalize and punch Ologun repeatedly in the head, leading to a stoppage of the bout after 16 seconds into the first round.

Ologun's latest fight was on the next year's K-1 Dynamite show against the returning Bob Sapp. Once again, he was defeated easily by his larger and more powerful opponent by Technical Knock Out in the first round.

Ologun made his return to martial arts against Katsuya Kitamura at Rizin 32 on November 20, 2021. He won the bout via rear-naked choke in the second round.

== Arrests & convictions ==
=== R&A promotions assault ===
On January 25, 2006, Ologun allegedly assaulted Katsuyuki Itō, the president of the entertainment agency, R&A Promotions, to which Ologun belongs in Shibuya. Police deliberated whether to send prosecution documents to court in lieu of the charges. According to the investigation, Ologun reportedly seized the president's clothes and acted violently by throwing around furniture because of a dispute over payment. John Muwete Muruaka, who is famous in Japan as the former private secretary of the scandalized Representative Muneo Suzuki and a member of the same agency as Ologun, happened to be there and tried to stop the fight, resulting in a scuffle between the two men.

Ologun later denied that the incident had happened saying, "I didn't hit anybody. On the contrary, I was hit by Muruaka" at a news conference on the same day. The official explanation presented later was that Ologun was being paid per the stipulations of his contract, but he did not fully understand the Japanese legalese in it, so he made a deal which he did not fully understand.

At the same time, it was found that he had lied about his age when the police checked his driver's license in Harajuku police station. He had until then claimed to have been born in 1973, but he was actually born in 1966. Ologun now uses this incident as part of his gimmick by lying about his age on his blog and on television shows as he maintains his fictitious 1973 birth year.

He was banned from appearing on Japanese television for three months and was confined to his quarters from January to April 2006 by the geinokai following the assault incident. He has since returned to television, but his appearances and bookings have been sparse as compared to before the incident. This was believed to be because the talent agency that held his contract, R&A Promotions, was not sending any jobs his way due to the bad publicity surrounding the incident. Ologun was still under contract to R&A until December 2007. For that reason, and even though he was under contract and the legality of his actions were questionable, in May 2006, Ologun announced the start of his own independent talent agency, Alemco Productions. However, on September 8, 2006, an announcement on Ologun's blog by R&A Promotions mentioned that they had come to a reconciliation with Ologun and were representing him once again.

=== Domestic violence conviction ===
On May 16, 2020, police were called to his residence by his wife after reports that he had struck her in the face in front of their three children. He was arrested and released 2 days later on May 18 21:19. In a press conference his wife stated that she had endured "all kinds of domestic violence over a long period." Saitama Police later searched their home in connection with the case. On December 3, 2020, Ologun pleaded guilty and on May 13, 2021, was fined 100,000 yen.

=== Rape arrest ===
On June 14, 2026, Ologun was arrested at Haneda airport over charges of rape that allegedly occurred on April 21, 2026, at his Chiba residence.

On November 13, he admitted to his rape charges.

== Personal life ==
- Ologun's younger brother, Andy Ologun, is a K-1 lightweight mixed martial artist and kickboxer in Japan. Bobby was in his corner for his first ever fight in a losing effort at K-1 MAX 2006.
- Ologun was married to a Japanese woman named Kyoko Konda, whom he divorced in May 2025.
- He has five children.
- On October 9, 2021, Ologun rescued a drowning man from a river in Koshigaya, Saitama. On November 5, 2021 he was presented a letter of appreciation by the Saitama Police Department.

== In popular culture ==
- Ologun is a character voiced by himself in Shin Goketsuji Ichizoku: Bonnou Kaihou, namely as the new boss character. His set of moves does not involve any moves associated with K-1, however, they are more comical, possibly owing to his associations with comedy in Japanese culture. The character itself was later renamed "Bobby Strong", due to licensing reasons.
- Ologun had a cameo appearance in 2005s angling comedy Tsuribaka Nisshi 16, a long running movie series with Japanese actor/comedian Toshiyuki Nishida.

== Mixed martial arts record ==
Professional record breakdown
5 matches	3 wins	2 losses
By knockout	0	2
By submission	1	0
By decision	2	0

Res.	Record	Opponent	Method	Event	Date	Round	Time	Location	Notes
Win	3–2	Katsuya Kitamura	Submission (rear-naked choke)	Rizin 32	November 20, 2021	2	2:34	Okinawa, Japan	
Loss	2–2	Bob Sapp	TKO (punches)	K-1 PREMIUM 2007 Dynamite!!	December 31, 2007	1	4:10	Osaka, Japan	
Loss	2–1	Choi Hong-man	TKO (punches)	K-1 Premium 2006 Dynamite!!	December 31, 2006	1	0:16	Osaka, Japan	
Win	2–0	Akebono	Decision (unanimous)	K-1 Premium 2005 Dynamite	December 31, 2005	3	3:00	Osaka, Japan	
Win	1–0	Cyril Abidi	Decision (unanimous)	K-1 Premium 2004 Dynamite	December 31, 2004	3	3:00	Osaka, Japan	

== Kickboxing record ==
Professional record breakdown
1 match	0 wins	1 loss
By knockout	0	0
By submission	0	0
By decision	0	1

Res.	Record	Opponent	Method	Event	Date	Round	Time	Location	Notes
Loss	0-1	(Japan) Yusuke Fujimoto	Decision (unanimous)	K-1 World Grand Prix 2006 in Sapporo	July 30, 2006	3	3:00	Sapporo, Japan	
