= Goddotan =

- Also known as: The God Tongue
- Genre: Variety
- Directed by: Nobuyuki Sakuma
- Starring: Ogiyahagi (Hiroaki Ogi and Ken Yahagi); Hitori Gekidan; Yūki Matsumaru
- Country of origin: Japan
- Original language: Japanese

Production
- Executive producer: Nobuyuki Sakuma
- Producers: Nobuyuki Sakuma, Hiroko Tsuyuki
- Running time: 30 minutes

Original release
- Network: TV Tokyo
- Release: October 8, 2005 – present

Goddotan (ゴッドタン 〜The God Tongue 神の舌〜, The God Tongue) is a Japanese variety show, broadcast since 2005 on TV Tokyo. In 2013, Toho produced a film based on the show, Goddotan kiss patience Championship - The Movie, directed by Nobuyuki Sakuma. It debuted at number 15 on the Japanese box office chart.
