= Motomu Azaki =

Japanese actor and voice actor

- Born: March 7, 1960 (age 65); Nobeoka, Miyazaki, Japan
- Occupation(s): Actor, voice actor
- Spouse: Honoka Suzuki
- Website: http://www.motomu-azaki.com/

Motomu Azaki (安崎 求, Azaki Motomu; born March 7, 1960) is a Japanese actor and voice actor from Nobeoka, Miyazaki. He is attached to Aoni Production, Nichine Promotion, Soeta Office and Horipro. He is married to actress Honoka Suzuki.

== Roles ==
=== Stage ===
- Barefoot Gen (Father)
- Everyone Says I Love You (Charles Ferry)
- Gentlemen Prefer Blondes (Henry Spofford)
- The Glass Menagerie (Tom Wingfield)
- Gone with the Wind (Charles Hamilton)
- The King and I (Lun Tha)
- Les Misérables (Marius Pontmercy (1987–1988), Thénardier (2007–2009))
- Mary Poppins (Admiral Boom/President)
- Miss Saigon (Chris)
- My Fair Lady (Harry)
- In the Heights (Kevin Rosario)
- Parade (Newt Lee)
- Promises, Promises (J.D. Sheldrake)
- Saturday Night Fever (Frank Junior)
- Sweeney Todd: The Demon Barber of Fleet Street (Judge Turpin)
- Twelfth Night (Sir Toby Belch)
- The Umbrellas of Cherbourg (Monsieur Dubourg)
- Whistle Down the Wind (Ed)

=== Television drama ===
- Hanshichi Torimonochō
- Koi
- Sensei no Okiniiri!

=== Television animation ===
- Yu-Gi-Oh! Duel Monsters (Marik's father)

=== Dubbing roles ===
==== Live-action ====
- Cradle Will Rock (Canada Lee (Chris McKinney))

==== Animation ====
- All Dogs Go to Heaven 2 (Charlie B. Barkin)
- Ice Age (Lenny)
- Frozen (A Troll)
- Moana (Tui)
- Moana 2 (Tui)
- Pocahontas II: Journey to a New World (John Rolfe)
- The Powerpuff Girls (Professor Utonium)
- The Powerpuff Girls Movie (Professor Utonium)
- The Princess and the Frog (Doctor Facilier)

=== Other roles ===
- Cartoon Network commercial spots (Professor Utonium)
