= Ken Watabe =

Japanese comedian and television presenter

- 渡部建
- Born: 23 September 1972 (age 54); Hachiōji, Tokyo
- Education: Kanagawa University–Faculty of Economics School JCA
- Occupations: Comedian; television presenter
- Years active: 1994–present
- Agent: Production Jinrikisha
- Style: Conte (tsukkomi)
- Television: Hirunandesu!; Academy Night Q; Love music; Gyōretsu no dekiru Hōritsusōdansho; FNS uta no Natsu matsuri; FNS Music Festival; FNS uta no Haru matsuri; Moshimo no Nedan; Semason; Geinin Hōdō; Moshimo no Simulation Variety: Otameshika'!; Shinobu Sakagami no Seichō Man!
- Height: 1.75 m (5 ft 9 in)
- Spouse: Nozomi Sasaki (m. 2017)
- Partner: Kazuya Kojima
- Children: 2

Ken Watabe (渡部建, Watabe Ken; born 23 September 1972), is a Japanese comedian and television presenter. He performs tsukkomi in the comedy duo "Unjash" with his partner Kazuya Kojima. Watabe currently serves as a co-MC with Chisato Moritaka in the Fuji TV program Love Music.

== Biography ==
Watabe was born in Hachiōji, Tokyo. He has an older brother and sister. He graduated from Hachiōji Municipal Katakura Stand Elementary School, Hachiōji Tatsunaka Mountain Junior High School, Tokyo Metropolitan Hino High School and Kanagawa University Faculty of Economics.

In 1993, when he was in his second year in university Watabe was invited from his high school classmate Kazuya Kojima to say that he "will not laugh with you" or "have only you". They later formed the comedy duo Unjash. Watabe was told from his partner that he was the fifth member. (According to Arashi no Shukudai-kun, aired on Monday, 14 January 2008)

He graduated from the second year of Jinrikisha Comedy School JCA. Watabe entered a half a year late, and had hardly received classes.

== Personal life ==
On April 11, 2017, Watabe married fashion model and actress Nozomi Sasaki, who is sixteen years younger than him. Sasaki gave birth to their first child, a son, in September 13, 2018.

In June 2020, Shūkan Bunshun published allegations that Watabe had been involved in extramarital affairs throughout their relationship, some of which involved secret meetings at accessible toilet restrooms in Roppongi Hills, and for which he would pay his partner ¥10,000 yen in cash. Watabe admitted to the relationships and apologized for his behavior, cancelling several of his public appearances. Despite this revelation, Sasaki gave birth to a second child, a daughter, which was born on April 27, 2023.

== Filmography ==
=== TV programmes ===
==== Current ====
Year	Title	Network	Notes	Ref.
2011	Hirunandesu!	NTV	Tuesday Regular	
2013	Aiba Manabu	TV Asahi		
2015	Academy Night Q	TBS	MC	
2015	Gyōretsu no dekiru Hōritsusōdansho	NTV	Quasi-regular	
2015	Love music	Fuji TV	MC	
2015	FNS uta no Natsu matsuri	Fuji TV	MC	
2015	FNS Music Festival	Fuji TV	MC	
2016	FNS uta no Haru matsuri	Fuji TV	MC	

==== Former ====
Year	Title	Network	Notes
2011	Onegai!	TV Asahi	"Yūji no buccha ke Heya, Home Watanabe no Sugo i Ranking"
2011	Kyawakore TV	Tokyo MX	MC
2011	Hashigoman	Tokyo MX	MC
2013	10-Biki no Kobuta-chan: Yasegaman shinai TV	Fuji TV	MC
2013	Moshimo no Nedan	Fuji TV	MC
2013	AnoHito-tachi no Tsukurikata: Naze kō natta!? Factory	Fuji TV	MC
2013	Semason	NTV	MC
2014	Kore Kangaeta Hito, Tensai ja ne!? Ima sugu Yakudatsu Seikatsu no Chie, Atsumemashita	TV Tokyo	First MC
2014	News na Bansan-kai	Fuji TV	MC
2015	Suiyō Kayō-sai	Fuji TV	MC
2015	Tokyo Extra	TBS	MC
2015	Academy Night Q	TBS	MC
	Geinin Hōdō	NTV	Quasi-regular
	Shinobu Sakagami no Seichō Man!	TV Asahi	Quasi-regular
	Cream Quiz Miracle 9	TV Asahi	Quasi-regular

=== Radio ===
==== Current ====
Year	Title	Network	Notes
2012	Gold Rush	J-Wave	Navigator

==== Former ====
Year	Title	Network	Notes
2007	Platon	J-Wave	Navigator
2011	Circus Circus	J-Wave	Navigator

=== TV dramas ===
Year	Title	Role	Network	Notes
2007	Hataraki Man	Makoto Chiba	NTV	Episode 9
2012	Saiko no Jinsei	Host	TBS	Episode 3
2016	Funassyi Tantei		Fuji TV	Narration

=== Internet ===
Year	Title	Website	Ref.
2012	Shūkan Otoko Jishin	Bee TV	
2016	Watabe no Arukkata	Hulu	

=== Dubbing ===
Year	Title	Role
2010	Clash of the Titans	Graeae's witch
2016	Storks	Junior

=== Stage ===
Year	Title	Role
2006	Renai Gikyoku	Masaya Mukai

=== Advertisements ===
Year	Title	Ref.
2015	Suntory Precious "Onagokai with Watabe: Hokkaidō-ban", "Onagokai with Watabe: Futatabi Hokkaidō-ban"	

== Bibliography ==
=== Books ===
Year	Title	ISBN	Ref.
2009	Escape!	ISBN 978-4344017085	
2012	Home Watabe no "Homeru Gijutsu" 7	ISBN 978-4833420082	
2014	Geinō-kai no Athend-ō ga Oshieru: Saikyō no Mise 77-ken	ISBN 978-4163901343	
2015	Geinō-kai no Gourmet-ō ga Sekai ni Susumeru! Tokyo Saikyō no 100-sara	ISBN 9784163903477	
2016	Watabe Kōkō Yakyū no Mikatadesu.	ISBN 978-4048955805	
2016	Watabe-ryū: Ī Mise no Mitsuke-kata Oshiemasu. Subete Shinten: Hatsudashi 80-ken	ISBN 978-4163905471	
2018	Unjash Watabe no Otona no Tame no "Ī Mise" Erabi-kata no Gokui	ISBN 978-4797394511	
2022	Chō-ichiryū no Kaiwa-ryoku	ISBN 9784866631868	

=== Serials ===
Title
Men's Non-no "Renai Shinri Naika Watabe Clinic"
Hōchi Kōkō Yakyū "Ken Watabe no Kandō gochisōsama!!"

=== Screenplay ===
Title	Notes	Ref.
Glay "Eternally"	Music video; Co-writer	
