= Doctor Lautrec and the Forgotten Knights =

2011 video game

- Developers: Konami; Winkysoft
- Publisher: Konami
- Designer: Noriaki Okamura
- Artist: Hideyuki Takenami
- Platform: Nintendo 3DS
- Release: JP: July 7, 2011; EU: December 2, 2011; NA: December 6, 2011
- Genre: Adventure
- Mode: Single-player

Doctor Lautrec and the Forgotten Knights (Note: Japanese: ドクターロートレックと忘却の騎士団, Hepburn: Dokutā Rōtorekku to Bōkyaku no Kishidan; lit. Doctor Lautrec and the Knights of Oblivion) is an adventure game for the Nintendo 3DS. It was co-developed by Konami and Winkysoft and designed by Zone of the Enders director Noriaki Okamura. The game is set in late 19th-century Paris, and follows the eponymous protagonist, archaeologist Doctor Lautrec, on his quest for a hidden treasure of the Bourbon dynasty.

== Gameplay ==
Doctor Lautrec and the Forgotten Knights is played on the Nintendo 3DS. The game progresses as the player navigates the environment, puts together clues, and solves puzzles.

== Plot ==
Doctor Lautrec and the Forgotten Knights takes place in Paris at the end of the 19th century, during the Belle Époque. The protagonist of the game, the eccentric and mystery-solving archaeologist Doctor Jean-Pierre Lautrec, is a lecturer at the city's Museum of Natural History. Together with his assistant Sophie Coubertin, a university student, he comes into possession of a map that leads to a hidden treasure of Louis XIV. On their quest through Paris and the catacombs beneath it, Doctor Lautrec and Sophie are pursued by a crime syndicate and the Knights of the Iron Mask, an order of knights with iron masks and claws.

== Development ==
Doctor Lautrec and the Forgotten Knights was designed, written, directed and produced by Zone of the Enders director Noriaki Okamura. It was co-developed by Konami and Winkysoft, and marked Okamura's first experience with the stereoscopic three-dimensional graphics of the Nintendo 3DS handheld console. The game shares many aesthetic, and story similarities to Level-5's Professor Layton series of adventure games, and Okamura said he is inspired by that series.

== Reception ==
The game was met with mixed reception. The UK Official Nintendo Magazine stated that the game had a lot of work put into it, but in general, slowly falls into repetition, with them giving it score of 69%. They also noted its overt similarities to the Professor Layton series, and often referred to the game as a flagrant rip-off of the aforementioned franchise that is clearly intended to "cash-in" on its success.
