= Carolyn Kawasaki =

Japanese celebrity, gaijin tarento

Carolyn Kawasaki (川﨑カイヤ, born Carolyn Jo Higar on 25 May 1962) is an American model, a Japanese television personality, and businessperson from German Valley, Illinois. Before her Japanese television in debut, she traveled to Europe, the US, and Japan as a fashion model for Vogue, Harper's Bazaar, Cosmopolitan and others.

== Early life and modeling career ==
Carolyn Kawasaki, nicknamed Caiya by the Japanese media, was born in German Valley, Illinois, to Patricia Jacobs and Richard Higar. She was scouted by model agent Eileen Ford, while shopping with her mother in Chicago. She went on to live with Ford at her house in New York. Soon after she went on to model for famous brands including Chloe, Salvatore Ferragamo, Giofranco Ferre, Vogue, Harper's Bazaar, Cosmopolitan. She was selected for the "Unitika swimwear campaign" in Japan. As a result, she started working in the Japanese entertainment business and appeared in television shows, commercials, movies, and dramas. She has written lifestyle books on topics including cooking, English, DIY, interior design, fashion, and beauty. She opened a fashion boutique. She has wrestled on "Hustle", a Japanese wrestling show

== Books ==
- In 1999, Caiya released a cooking book, Caiya no Ai Ippai Cooking.
- In 2001, she released an English conversation book, Caiya no Eikaiwa Haato de Tooku.
- In 2002, she released a beauty book, Caiya no Anti-Aging.
- In 2004, she released an interior design book, Home Sweet Home Caiya.
