= Yūki Himura =

Japanese comedian, actor and voice actor (born 1972)

- 日村 勇紀
- Born: 14 May 1972 (age 54); Sagamihara, Kanagawa, Japan
- Other names: Himuken (ヒムケン); Nogizaka Kōshiki o Manjū (乃木坂公式お饅); Hechima (ヘチマ); Takeshi (たけし); Timura (ティムラ); Vibe (バイブ, Baibu); Baka Salmon (バカサーモン, Baka Sāmon); Baramandi (バラマンディ)
- Education: Kanagawa Prefecture Sagami Tanami High School
- Occupations: Comedian; actor; voice actor
- Years active: 1990–present
- Agent: Horipro Com
- Style: Conte (tsukkomi)
- Television: Yasashī Hitonara Tokeru: Quiz yasashī ne; Mannen B-gumi Himuken Sensei; Motemote Ninety Nine; "Sore tte donna hito?" Sōsa Variety: G-Men 99
- Spouse: Aika Kanda (m. 2018)
- Awards: 2006 All Japan Radio & Television Commercial Confederation (ACC) Festival ACC Finalist; 2006 TV Asahi Tora no Mon Seiko Ito Night "King of Speech" second champion; 2010 Omobaka 8 First Round

Notes
- Same year/generation as: Taizo Harada, Ken Horiuchi (Neptune); Ninety-nine; Yoiko

Yūki Himura (日村 勇紀, Himura Yūki; born 14 May 1972) is a Japanese comedian, actor and voice actor. He performs tsukkomi (and occasionally boke) in the comedy duo Bananaman. His partner is Osamu Shitara.

== Personal life ==
Himura was born in Kamo District, Hiroshima (present-day Higashihiroshima City). He has an older brother. His whole family moved to Sagamihara, Kanagawa Prefecture when he was three years old. He took part in many performance and comedy-focused clubs as a high school student, and independently for about a year after graduating.

On October 1993, he was invited by Nishiaki Motoki to "do comedy with four people," and it was at that gathering that he met his current work partner, Osamu Shitara. They separated from the group quickly thereafter and began performing as a duo, Bananaman.

Himura is currently represented with Horipro Com.

Himura has a signature bowl cut hairstyle, and is left-handed.

=== Relationship and marriage ===
In April 2018, Himura announced on his radio program that he had married television announcer Aika Kanda. The two have reportedly been dating since 2015.

== Filmography ==
=== Variety ===
Current appearances

| Year | Title | Network | Notes | Ref. |
|---|---|---|---|---|
| 2015 | Yasashī Hitonara Tokeru: Quiz yasashī ne | Fuji TV | | |
| 2016 | Mannen B-gumi Himuken Sensei | TBS | | |
| 2016 | Anata no Mae de Iwa sete Kudasai: Kore tsukutta no Watashi desu | TV Tokyo | Presenter | |

Occasional appearances

| Year | Title | Network | Notes |
|---|---|---|---|
| 2016 | VS Arashi | Fuji TV | Appeared 14 times, boasted in his 2nd appearance |

Former appearances

| Year | Title | Network | Notes | Ref. |
|---|---|---|---|---|
| | Lincoln | TBS | "Bananaman Himura no suberu Hanashi" (Note: It was strictly not a programme.) | |
| 2009 | Shingata Geinin Auction: Kiriuri –Okane no tamenara koko made yarimasu– | TBS | | |
| 2009 | Save The Future: Ekorezo TV | NHK | | |
| 2009 | Quiz no Tobira | TBS | | |
| 2010 | Minna de Nihon Go! | NHK | Guest | |
| 2010 | Meringue no Kimochi | NTV | Guest | |
| 2010 | Ippon Grand Prix | Fuji TV | | |
| 2011 | Hitoshi Matsumoto no MaruMaru na Hanashi | Fuji TV | | |
| 2011 | Motemote Ninety Nine | TBS | Regular | |
| 2012 | battle for money Sentō-chū | Fuji TV | | |
| 2014 | Gamble the World | TBS | | |
| 2014 | 6-Ri no Murabito! Zenin Shūgō | TBS | | |
| 2014 | "Sore tte donna hito?" Sōsa Variety: G-Men 99 | TBS | Regular | |

=== TV drama ===
| Year | Network | Title | Role | Notes |
|---|---|---|---|---|
| 1993 | TV Asahi | Kodaku-san | | |
| 1997 | TV Asahi | Kyoto o Miai Tour | Shiga Prefectural Police detective | |
| 1998 | TV Asahi | "Mayu no Misshitsu" Renzoku Satsujin Jiken | Katsuhiko Takasa | |
| 2005 | BS Fuji | Run Away Girl Nagareru Onna | Erika's fan | |
| 2006 | TBS | Akihabara@Deep | Dharma | |
| 2006 | ABC | Fugo Keiji | Norio Nomura | Episode 9; Guest |
| 2007 | TV Tokyo | Kyonen Renoir de | Clerk C | |
| 2007 | Fuji TV | Abarenbō Mama | Takuo Kanai | |
| 2009 | TV Tokyo | K-tai Investigator 7 | Kazu | Episode 39; Guest |
| 2009 | TV Asahi | Shūkatsu no Musume | Ryunosuke Shirato | |
| 2009 | TV Asahi | My Girl | Hidemi Kimura | |
| 2010 | NTV | Warau Joyū: Aoi Tori | Junpei Yamada | |
| 2011 | TV Asahi | Hagane no Onna Season 2 | Stall guest | Episode 5; Guest |
| 2011 | Fuji TV | Nazotoki wa Dinner no Ato de | Clerk | Episode 6; Guest |
| 2011 | TV Asahi | Jūichinin mo iru! | Real estate agent | Final Episode; Guest |
| 2012 | TBS | Irodori Himura | Takeo Ozaki, Tetsu Murata, Lars Fonde Himura, Saburo Kobayashi / Shinozaki, Masaru Edo, Takeshita, Mikami, Shuji Taki, Himura Yūki I, Yūki Himura | Lead roles |
| 2013 | TBS | Hōkago Groove | Satoshi Murata | Episode 4; Guest |
| 2014 | TV Tokyo | Garo: Makai no Hana | Sekiya | Episode 1; Guest |
| 2014 | Fuji TV | Sutekina-sen Taxi | Accomplice criminal | Episodes 7 and 8 |
| 2015 | Fuji TV | Yōgi-sha wa 8-ri no Ninki Geinin | Himself | |
| 2020 | NHK | Yell | Kasukabe | Asadora |

=== Films ===
| Year | Title | Role | Notes | Ref. |
|---|---|---|---|---|
| 1993 | Patlabor 2: The Movie | (voice) | | |
| 1994 | Yokohama Bakkure-tai | Kanichi | Appeared in all three films | |
| 1995 | Bad Guy Beach | Kogure | | |
| 2005 | Hold Up Down | Wanderer's man | | |
| 2007 | Captain Tokio | Chairman | | |
| 2007 | Maiko Haaaan!!! | Camera kid | | |
| 2008 | Handsome Suits | Bossaiku man | | |
| 2009 | Eto | Eto (voice) | | |
| 2009 | Shugo Tenshi | Country youth | | |
| 2010 | Saikō de Damena Otoko-Tsukiji-hen: Tsukiji de Ichiban Damena Otoko | | Lead role | |
| 2010 | The Incite Mill | Indian doll (voice) | | |
| 2015 | Shinsengumi of the Dead | Gestaro Kuzuyama | Lead role | |
| 2023 | My Brother, the Alien | Yumeji Sanada | | |

=== Japanese dub ===
| Year | Title | Role | Notes | Ref. |
|---|---|---|---|---|
| 2009 | Monsters vs. Aliens | Bob | | |
| 2010 | Space Buddies | Yuri | | |
| 2011 | Happy Feet Two | Okiami's bill | | |
| 2015 | Minions | Walter Jr. / Fab Lease | | |
| 2016 | The Secret Life of Pets | Duke | | |

=== Advertisements ===
| Year | Title | Notes | Ref. |
|---|---|---|---|
| 1995 | Meiji Chocolate Yawaraka | | |
| 2010 | Universal Music DJ Kaori's Inmix VI | | |
| 2013 | AEON Topvalu Inner | Co-starring with Kayoko Okubo | |
| 2020 | If You Eat Meat, You Can Save Japan | Two versions of the video advertisement, "Conflict" version and "Press Conference" version | |
| 2020 | Triple Barrier | | |

=== Video games ===
| Title | Role | Ref. |
|---|---|---|
| Doctor Lautrec and the Forgotten Knights | Paul Le Petit | |

=== Smartphone Applications ===
| Year | Title | Ref. |
|---|---|---|
| 2013 | Bananaman Himura-san Kikiippatsu | |
