= Takumi Mitani =

Japanese female singer (born 1986)

Takumi Mitani 三谷 たくみ
- Also known as: Takumi-onēsan (たくみおねえさん)
- Born: 8 May 1986 (age 40); Kamakura, Kanagawa Prefecture, Japan
- Genres: Children's song
- Occupations: Singer; tarento
- Years active: 2008-2016

Takumi Mitani (三谷 たくみ, 三谷 卓美, Mitani Takumi; born 8 May 1986) is a Japanese female singer. She is the 20th Uta no Onēsan in the NHK series Okaasan to Issho. She was born in Kamakura, Kanagawa Prefecture.

== Biography, personal life ==
Takumi Mitana is the youngest of three siblings. She learnt to play the piano from the age of three, and started singing vocals at high school.

She graduated from the Senzoku Gakuen College of Music Music Vocal Course in March 2009. While studying at the university, she passed the audition of Okaasan to Issho (NHK Educational TV), and from 20 March 2008 to 31 March 2016 played Uta no Onēsan of the twentieth generation.

== Discography ==
=== Singles ===
- "Donsuka Panpan Ōendan" 18 Mar 2009
- "Yukidaruma no Rou" 7 Jan 2015

=== Albums ===
- Okaasan to Issho: Saishin Best: Manmaru Smile 15 Oct 2008
- Okaasan to Issho: Special 50 Selection 15 Jul 2009
- Okaasan to Issho: Saishin Best: Bokura no Uta 21 Oct 2009
- Okaasan to Issho: Saishin Best: Koronpa' 20 Oct 2010
- Okaasan to Issho: Saishin Best: Sore ga Tomodachi 19 Oct 2011
- Okaasan to Issho: Saishin Best: Pan Papa Pan 17 Oct 2012

=== DVD ===
- NHK Okaasan to Issho Family Concert: Tomodachi Hajimete Hajimemashite! 6 Aug 2008
- NHK Okaasan to Issho Family Concert: Omatsuri Concert o Surikaero! 4 Feb 2009
- Okaasan to Issho Saishin Song Book: Atchikotchi March 15 Apr 2009
- NHK Okaasan to Issho Family Concert: Monoranmonoran Konichiwa! 5 Aug 2009
- NHK Okaasan to Issho Family Concert: Hoshizora no Merry-Go-Round -50 Shūnenkinen Concert- 3 Feb 2010
- Okaasan to Issho Saishin Song Book: Arigatō no Hana 21 Apr 2010
- NHK Okaasan to Issho Special Stage: Aozora Wonderland 2 Jun 2010
- NHK Okaasan to Issho Family Concert: Monoranmonoran to Kumo no Ki 4 Aug 2010
- NHK Okaasan to Issho Family Concert: Mori no Ongaku Restaurant 2 Feb 2011
- Okaasan to Issho Saishin Song Book: Dokonokonokinoko 20 Apr 2011
- NHK Okaasan to Issho Special Stage: Oideyo! Yume no Yuenchi 18 May 2011
- NHK Okaasan to Issho Family Concert: Pote iji ma e yōkoso!! 3 Aug 2011
- Okaasan to Issho Winter Special: Minna de Party! 2 Nov 2011
- NHK Okaasan to Issho Special Stage: Minna Issho ni! Fanfan Smile 21 Nov 2012
- In addition, many appearances on Okaasan to Issho related DVD.

== Okaasan to Issho concerts ==
Year	Title	Cast (except for some)
2008	Tomodachi Hajimete Hajimemashite!	Daisuke Yokoyama, Takumi Mitani, Yoshihisa Kobayashi, Mayu Ito; Spoo, Anem, Zuzu, Jacobee, Gataratto; Yuzo Imai, Shoko Haida
2008	Omatsuri Concert o Surikaero!	Daisuke Yokoyama, Takumi Mitani, Yoshihisa Kobayashi, Mayu Ito; Spoo, Anem, Zuzu, Jacobee, Gataratto; Osamu Hinata, Miki Kamada, Yu Ebata
2009	Monoranmonoran Konichiwa!	Daisuke Yokoyama, Takumi Mitani, Yoshihisa Kobayashi, Mayu Ito; Raigō, Suirin, Puuto
2009	ETV50: Character Dai Shūgō Todoke! Minna no Genki Power: Kagayake! Kodomo Bangumi Genkida! Taishō	Daisuke Yokoyama, Takumi Mitani, Yoshihisa Kobayashi, Mayu Ito; Raigō, Suirin, Puuto; Wanwan, Kotochan, Eric, Jenny, Kebo, Motchi, Wakuwaku-san, Gorori; Koni-chan, Yui, Tsubasa, Rika, Ryotaro; Stretchman, Ayame-chan, Main, Domo-kun; (VTR appearance) Kondon, Minobo, Terebi Senshi, Jumoku-san; (VTR appearance) Akira, Score, Aria, Flat, Sharp; (VTR appearance) Ojarumaru, Sui-chan, Kosshi; Sabo-san
2009	Hoshizora no Merry-Go-Round: 50 Shūnenkinen Concert	Daisuke Yokoyama, Takumi Mitani, Yoshihisa Kobayashi, Mayu Ito; Raigō, Suirin, Puuto; Osamu Hinata, Miki Kamada, Yu Ebata; Spoo, Anem, Zuzu, Jacobee; Yoshiko Mari, Seiji Tanaka; Osamu Sakata, Yuko Kanzaki, Kentaro Hayami, Ayumi Shigemori; Akihiro Sugita, Yuzo Imai, Shoko Haida; Katsuhiro Amano, Hiromichi Sato; Jajamaru, Pikkoro, Borori
2010	Aozora Wonderland	Daisuke Yokoyama, Takumi Mitani, Yoshihisa Kobayashi, Mayu Ito; Raigō, Suirin, Puuto; Osamu Hinata, Miki Kamada, Yu Ebata; Spoo, Anem, Zuzu, Jacobee
2010	Monoranmonoran to Kumo no Ki	Daisuke Yokoyama, Takumi Mitani, Yoshihisa Kobayashi, Mayu Ito; Raigō, Suirin, Puuto
2010	Mori no Ongaku Restaurant	Daisuke Yokoyama, Takumi Mitani, Yoshihisa Kobayashi, Mayu Ito; Raigō, Suirin, Puuto; Kentaro Hayami, Miki Kamada
2011	Oideyo! Yume no Yuenchi	Daisuke Yokoyama, Takumi Mitani, Yoshihisa Kobayashi, Mayu Ito; Raigō, Suirin, Puuto; Wanwan; (VTR appearance) Yu-kun; Osamu Hinata, Miki Kamada; Spoo, Anem, Zuzu, Jacobee
2011	Poteijima e Yōkoso!	Daisuke Yokoyama, Takumi Mitani, Yoshihisa Kobayashi, Mayu Ito; Mutekichi, Meenya, Meycob; Lalapa, Zougame no Chourousama; Aoashikatsuodori no Yuubinyasan
2011	Dō Suru! Dō Naru? Gochisō Matsuri	Daisuke Yokoyama, Takumi Mitani, Yoshihisa Kobayashi, Mayu Ito; Mutekichi, Meenya, Meycob
2012	Poteijima Wakuwaku Marathon!	Daisuke Yokoyama, Takumi Mitani, Yoshihisa Kobayashi, Risa Uehara; Mutekichi, Meenya, Meycob; Lalapa, Zougame no Chourousama; Aoashikatsuodori no Yuubinyasan; Maamotto 3 Kyoudai
2012	Minna Issho ni! Fan Fan Smile	Daisuke Yokoyama, Takumi Mitani, Yoshihisa Kobayashi, Risa Uehara; Mutekichi, Meenya, Meycob; Wanwan, Pakkun, Rin, Koron; Osamu Sakata, Mayu Ito, Jajamaru, Pikkoro, Borori
2012	Uta to Dance no Kurukuru Shoutengai	Daisuke Yokoyama, Takumi Mitani, Yoshihisa Kobayashi, Risa Uehara; Mutekichi, Meenya, Meycob
2013	Fushigi! Fushigi! Omocha no Oisha-san	Daisuke Yokoyama, Takumi Mitani, Yoshihisa Kobayashi, Risa Uehara; Mutekichi, Meenya, Meycob; Isao Taira
2013	Minna Issho ni!: Sora made todoke! Minna no Omoi!	Daisuke Yokoyama, Takumi Mitani, Yoshihisa Kobayashi, Risa Uehara; Mutekichi, Meenya, Meycob; Wanwan, Kotochan, Yu-kun, Koro, Bau; Shusshu, Poppo, Nao-chan; (VTR appearance) Lalapa, Utan, Seiya-kun, Pantan Ekichō
2013	Itazura Tamago no Daibōken!	Daisuke Yokoyama, Takumi Mitani, Yoshihisa Kobayashi, Risa Uehara; Mutekichi, Meenya, Meycob
2014	Mojimoji Yashiki kara no Chōsen-jō	Daisuke Yokoyama, Takumi Mitani, Yoshihisa Kobayashi, Risa Uehara; Mutekichi, Meenya, Meycob
2014	Minna Issho ni!: Genki-ippai Go! Go! Go!	Daisuke Yokoyama, Takumi Mitani, Yoshihisa Kobayashi, Risa Uehara; Mutekichi, Meenya, Meycob, Wanwan; Shusshu, Poppo, Nao-chan Seiya-kun; (VTR appearance) Pantan Ekichō
2014	Shabondamajotonainai Land	Daisuke Yokoyama, Takumi Mitani, Yoshihisa Kobayashi, Risa Uehara; Mutekichi, Meenya, Meycob
2015	Jagaimo-boshi Hito ni Aitai na	Daisuke Yokoyama, Takumi Mitani, Yoshihisa Kobayashi, Risa Uehara; Mutekichi, Meenya, Meycob
2015	Minna Issho ni!: Utatte Asonde Yume no Dai Bōken!	Daisuke Yokoyama, Takumi Mitani, Yoshihisa Kobayashi, Risa Uehara; Mutekichi, Meenya, Meycob; Wanwan, Shusshu, Poppo, Nao-chan, Seiya-kun
2015	Wakuwaku! Yume no Oshigoto Land	Daisuke Yokoyama, Takumi Mitani, Yoshihisa Kobayashi, Risa Uehara; Mutekichi, Meenya, Meycob
2016	Shiritoriji made Dai Bōken	Daisuke Yokoyama, Atsuko Ono, Yoshihisa Kobayashi, Risa Uehara; Cholome, Moomoo, Galapico; Takumi Mitani

Preceded by Shoko Haida	Okaasan to Issho Uta no Onēsan; 20th: 31 March 2008 – 2 April 2016	Succeeded by Atsuko Ono
