= Keizo Nakanishi =

Japanese singer-songwriter and composer (born 1964)

Keizo Nakanishi 中西 圭三
- Born: 11 November 1964 (age 61); Minami-ku, Okayama, Okayama Prefecture, Japan
- Genres: J-pop; soft rock; album-oriented rock; rhythm and blues; soul; jazz fusion
- Occupations: Singer-songwriter; composer
- Instrument: Vocals
- Years active: 1991–present
- Labels: Pioneer LDC (1991–2001); Universal J (2002–03); NBCUniversal Entertainment Japan (2004–06); VAP (2008); Tower Records (2011); AtoNO Records/Music United (2014); Warner Music Japan (2016–)

Keizo Nakanishi (中西 圭三, Nakanishi Keizō; born 11 November 1964, in Nadasaki, Kojima District (now Minami-ku, Okayama), Okayama Prefecture) is a Japanese singer-songwriter and composer. He graduated from Okayama Prefectural Kurashiki Amagi High School and Nihon University College of Economics. (Note: Besides Nakanishi and his senior Satoshi Ikeda joining the same university, other similar musicians went there such as Toshiki Kadomatsu.)

In 2017, Nakanishi participated as a guest artist at the annual touring ice show Fantasy on Ice in Makuhari. He performed in the show opening to the song "Choo Choo Train" amongst others.

== Discography ==
=== Singles ===
	Year	Title
1st	1991	"Tangerine Eyes"
2nd	1991	"Kataomoi no Birthday"
3rd	1992	"Woman"
4th	1992	"Kimi wa Kimi no Hokori"
5th	1992	"Ticket To Paradise"
6th	1992	"Ano Sora o Wasurenai"
7th	1992	"Kimi no iru Hoshi"
8th	1993	"You And I"
9th	1993	"Nemurenu Omoi"
10th	1993	"Tatta hitotsu no Ai o"
11th	1994	"A.C.E."
12th	1994	"Hijō Kaidan (Radio Mix)"
13th	1994	"Hijō Kaidan (Hyper-Radio Mix)"
14th	1994	"Kiss, Merry X'mas"
15th	1995	"Atarashī Boku ni narou"
16th	1995	"So Bad"
17th	1995	"Why Goodbye (Single Mix)"
18th	1996	"Must Be Heaven"
19th	1996	"Happy Ever After"
20th	1996	"Tsugi no Yume"
21st	1997	"Sorezore no Chiheisen"
22nd	1997	"What I Do For Love"
23rd	1997	"Ai wa ima"
24th	1998	"Negai"
25th	1998	"Meikyū no Rakuen (Break Out Mix)"
26th	1998	"Jack-In-The-Box '98"
27th	1999	"Kaze no Tobira"
28th	1999	"Higher Self"
29th	1999	"Touch of your lips"
30th	2000	"bug"
31st	2006	"Lighthouse Of Love –Keizo Nakanishi-Yae-Shinji Harada"

=== Original albums ===
	Year	Title
1st	1991	Keizo –Kanawanai Yume mo atta
2nd	1992	Yell
3rd	1993	Steps
4th	1994	Starting Over
5th	1995	graffiti
6th	1997	Spinning
7th	1998	Stay Gold
8th	1998	Songs
9th	1999	Moonlight Groove
10th	1999	Sunshine Groove
11th	2002	Kesshō
12th	2003	Idenshi
13th	2006	Folklore / L.O.T.U.S. –Satoshi Ikeda, Keizo Nakanishi, Ikuyo Akasaki, New Folklore Group–
14th	2008	I'm home'

=== Best Albums/Compilations ===
	Year	Title
1st	1994	Single
2nd	1999	Selection Blood Type [AB]
3rd	2000	Singles II
4th	2001	Best Selection
5th	2004	Keizo Nakanishi complete Best Selection –Choo Choo Train–
6th	2016	All Time Best –Keizo's 25th Anniversary–

=== Other participation works ===
Year	Artist	Title
1992	the Taps	Ashita gārusa
1997	Various artists	Kyu Sakamoto Tribute Album
2000	Various artists	Hibari Misora Tribute
2004	Junko Ohashi	trinta
2005	Various artists	a day / Green hearten
2006		Angel Heart Vocal Collection Vol. 2
2008		Masashi Sada Tribute: Masashi no uta
	Aichi-ken Aisai-shi Ichi no Uta	Itsu no Hi mo
	Aichi-ken Aisai-shi Ichi no Ondo	Aisei Ondo
	Kanagawa-ken Mitoyo-shi Ichi no Uta	Shippō no kaze
	Okayama-ken Okayama-shi	Okayama Shimin no Hi
	Okayama-ken Okayama-shi	Okayama! Shimin Taisō
	Meibutsu kamado	Kama dono uta
	Mukaiya Club	21st Love Express
	Mukaiya Club	Twilight Stream

=== Videos & laser discs ===
Year	Title
1994	One From The Heart

=== VSD (video single discs) ===
Year	Title
1991	Tangerine Eyes

== Music provisions ==
- 20th Century
- Ayano Ahane
- Namie Amuro with Super Monkey's
- Black Biscuits
- D-51
- Dream5
- Exile
- Hiromi Go
- Gospellers
- Shoko Haida
- Mayuki Hiramatsu
- The Idolmaster (Hibiki Ganaha)
- Satoshi Ikeda
- Ai Kago
- Reiko Kato
- Daisuke Kawakami
- Ruriko Kubo
- Ken Matsudaira
- Alisa Mizuki
- Hiroko Mori
- Mayo Nagata
- Miho Nakayama
- Manami Numakura
- Junko Ohashi
- Okaasan to Issho (Yuzo Imai, Shoko Haida, Daisuke Yokoyama, Takumi Mitani)
- Ryu Si-won
- Sachiko Sakurai
- Kaho Shimada
- Shonentai
- Akihiro Sugita
- Masayuki Suzuki
- Yasuhiro Suzuki
- Toku
- Harumi Tsuyuzaki
- V6
- Misato Watanabe
- Wink
- Toshinori Yonekura
- Takuro Yoshida "Banyan Beach Bar" (included in the album Hawaiian Rhapsody)
- Shinobu Yoshioka
- y'z factory
- Zoo

== Filmography ==
Title	Network
Uptown Square	Nack5
Keizo Nakanishi: Starting Over	JFN

=== NHK Kōhaku Uta Gassen appearances ===
Year/No.	No. of times	Song	Order	Opponent
1992/43rd	1st	"Kimi no iru Hoshi"	15/28	Gao

== Music videos ==
Director	Song
Kentaro Watanabe	"Izayoi no Tsuki"
Unknown	"A.C.E.", "Happy Ever After", "So Bad", "Ticket To Paradise", "Why Goodbye", "Woman", "You And I", "Ano Sora o Wasurenai", "Sorezore no Chiheisen", "Tangerine Eyes", "Ai wa ima", "Negai", "Tsugi no Yume", "What I Do For Love", "Hijō Kaidan"

== Main live performances ==
Year	Title
2008	Live R35 –Mōichido, Tsuma to Utaou.–
2011	Age Free Music
2012	Live! Do You Kyoto?
2012	Zoo Funk TV
2012	Kyo Pop
2013	Keizo Nakanishi×Tsutomu Egashira "Shiwaseno Cilci 2013"
2013	Sweet Heart Yokohama 2013
2013	Shoko Inoue Concert –25-Nen-me no kiseki–
2013	Shoko Haida Family Concert 2013
2013	Live! Do You Kyoto? 2013
2013	Golden Ring: Charity Concert: Egakou! Suriranka no Ashita o!
2014	Live! Do You Kyoto? 2014
2014	Sapporo Music Naked presents Real Music Village 2014
2015	21st Anniversary - 2015 m.c.A.T Matsuri - "Ore Fes"
2015	Shiwaseno Cilci 2015
2015	Live! Do You Kyoto? Vol. 8
2015	Machiko Watanabe Nanajūnana Starlight Symphony Charity Concert
2015	Dai Sakakibara: Seiya no Concert special
2016	Singers 3 Valentine Concert
2016	Shiwaseno Cilci 2016
2016	Around 40 memory concert
2016	Keizo Nakanishi 25th Anniversary's Special Stage
2016	Seaside Summer Fes Umibe no Carnival 2016
2016	Back To The Good Days
2016	Kawasaki Jazz 2016
2016	Masao Urino: Sakushi Katsudō 35 Shūnenkinen Concert
2017	2017 m.c.A.T Matsuri - "Ore Fes"
