= List of Idol × Warrior Miracle Tunes! episodes =

- No. of episodes: 51

Release
- Original network: TV Tokyo
- Original release: April 2, 2017 – March 25, 2018

Season chronology
- Next → Magical × Heroine Magimajo Pures!

Idol × Warrior Miracle Tunes! was originally broadcast from April 2, 2017, to March 25, 2018, on TV Tokyo and BS TV Tokyo. Episodes were also uploaded onto Takara Tomy's YouTube channel one week after its original broadcast date, with each new episode available to the public for up to one week.

Takashi Miike is the general director of the series. Additional staff members included Yoshitaka Yamaguchi, Takeshi Yokoi, Kenichiro Nishiumi, and Ryusuke Kurahashi as episode directors, with Hisako Fujihira, Kana Matsui, and Mao Aoki as the main writers for the show. The dances are choreographed by EXPG Studio.

Television ratings for Idol × Warrior Miracle Tunes! were low, averaging 1% in nationwide viewership and about 5-10% of viewers from the target audience. In addition, the official social media accounts had only 6,000 followers. However, it was considered a critical success and was credited as starting a "new genre" for shows aimed at the female toddler to primary school age demographic. The show was seen as a female counterpart to the Super Sentai series and focused on themes popular with the young female demographic, most notably Japanese idols. Sumiko Kodama from Confidence credits that the show's integration of J-pop elements in collaboration with LDH also made the presentation easy for audiences of all ages to enjoy, as Miracle²'s real-life debut would remind older audiences of Speed. Editors at Real Sound believe the popularity of Idol × Warrior Miracle Tunes! came from the revived interest in live-action tokusatsu shows aimed at a female audience, which had declined in the early 1990s due to competing toy sales with Sailor Moon and growing interest in magical girl anime series.

All theme songs were performed by Miracle², consisting of core cast members Asaka Uchida, Suzuka Adachi, Yuzuha Oda, Rina Usukura, and Mio Nishiyama performing as their characters. They are credited under the name Miracle² from Miracle Tunes (miracle² from ミラクルちゅーんず!, Mirakuru Mirakuru furomu Mirakuru Chūnzu!). The opening theme songs to the show are "Catch Me!" from episodes 1–15; "Catch Me! (Powered Up Version)" from episodes 16–25, an updated version including Usukura and Nishiyama's vocals; and "Ten Made Todoke" (天マデトドケ☆) from episodes 25–51. The ending theme songs are "Heart no Jewel" (ハートのジュエル) from episodes 1–15, "Jump!" from episodes 16–25, "Happy" from episodes 26–40, and "Maware Maware" (まわれ☆まわれ) from episodes 45–51.

A documentary titled Make a Miracle!: Until Miracle Tunes! is Made (メイク ア ミラクル！～ミラクルちゅーんず！ができるまで～) aired on September 1, 2017, as a television special. The documentary contains behind-the-scenes footage on the show, including the main cast's auditions and dance rehearsals.

== Episode list ==
No.	Title	Directed by	Written by	Original release date
1	"The Birth of Idol Warriors, Miracle Tunes!"; Transliteration: "Tanjō! Aidoru Senshi Mirakuru Chūnzu!" (Japanese: 誕生!アイドル戦士 ミラクルちゅーんず!)	Takashi Miike	Hisako Fujihira	April 2, 2017
Unable to gather enough Harmony Energy to fight alone, Mai holds auditions to recruit idols to help. Kanon auditions and meets another contestant, Alice Kagurazaka (Chinami Yoshioka). The Dokudoku-dan turns Alice's mother, Shizuko Kagurazaka (Shin Yazawa), into the Negative Jeweler, Hysteris, and she is outraged when Alice fails the first audition. To rescue her, Kanon is summoned by Poppun and battles alongside Mai, recovering the Violin Jewel.
2	"The New Warrior is a Dance Prodigy"; Transliteration: "Arata na Senshi wa Tensai Dansā" (Japanese: 新たな戦士は天才ダンサー)	Takashi Miike	Hisako Fujihira	April 9, 2017
During the final auditions, Kanon is chosen to be part of Mai's new group, Miracle², along with dance prodigy Fuka. Fuka is not interested in becoming an idol warrior, but she joins when Okada (Kenji Urai), a teacher from her elementary school, is turned into the Negative Jeweler Koegare. After defeating him, Miracle Tunes recovers the Piano Jewel.
3	"How Thrilling! Idol Activities Begin"; Transliteration: "Wakuwaku! Aidoru Katsudō Hajimaru" (Japanese: ワクワク! アイドル活動始まる)	Ryusuke Kurahashi	Hisako Fujihira	April 16, 2017
Kanon and Fuka move into the dormitory, and Kanon begins her first day of school at Angie Private Academy. The crossing guard (Haruna Uechi) is turned into the Negative Jeweler Katakotoyanen, Miracle Tunes defeating her to recover the Samba Jewel. With their Harmony Energy charged, Miracle² records their song, "Catch Me!", to prepare for their debut.
4	"How Exciting! Debut Event"; Transliteration: "Dokidoki! Debyū Ibento" (Japanese: ドキドキ! デビューイベント)	Ryusuke Kurahashi	Kana Matsui	April 23, 2017
Miracle²'s debut event draws near, and Kanon invites her classmates to attend. However, right before the event, the Dokudoku-dan turns a pet groomer (Maki Miyamoto) into the Negative Jeweler Nekojita, hoping to spread the Negative Aura to pet animals, starting with the dog of Rudolph, Kanon's classmate. Miracle Tunes purify Nekojita and recover the Mambo Jewel.
5	"Send Away, My Feelings! To Give a Bouquet to a Special Person"; Transliteration: "Todoke Watashi no Omoi! Taisetsu na Hito ni Hanataba wo" (Japanese: 届け私の思い! 大切な人に花束を)	Kenichiro Nishiumi	Kana Matsui	April 30, 2017
For Mother's Day, the girls decide to give their mother figures a flower bouquet. However, the florist (Ami Tomite) has been turned into the Negative Jeweler Tearegimi, who is spreading her Negative Aura through flowers. Miracle Tunes purify her and recover the Trumpet Jewel.
6	"Mai's Cooking Trouble"; Transliteration: "Mai no Toraburu Kukkingu" (Japanese: マイのトラブルクッキング)	Kenichiro Nishiumi	Kana Matsui	May 7, 2017
Miracle² films their first television appearance with popular child star Ryo on his cooking show, but when one of his fans (Ramu Matsumoto) turns into the Negative Jeweler Kubittake (クビッタケー) and turns the rest of his fans against him before Miracle Tunes rescue him and recover the Flute Jewel.
7	"Kanon, Big Trouble at the Television Feature!"; Transliteration: "Kanon, Micchaku Shuzai de Dai Pinchi!" (Japanese: カノン、密着取材で大ピンチ！)	Kenichiro Nishiumi	Mao Aoki	May 14, 2017
A camera crew follows Kanon for the entire day to get an exclusive interview with her. Kanon becomes careful about her image, until she and her classmate, Yunta, start throwing garbage at each other. Meanwhile, a garbage man (Yu Tokui) becomes the Negative Jeweler Honeorizon, causing him to block Park Road up with garbage. Miracle Tunes defeat him and recovers the Folk Jewel.
8	"Aim to Become a Fashionable Idol!"; Transliteration: "Mezase! Oshare Aidoru" (Japanese: 目指せ!オシャレアイドル)	Kenichiro Nishiumi	Hisako Fujihira	May 21, 2017
Kojiro takes the girls shopping, to Fuka's displeasure. Meanwhile, the Dokudoku-dan turns Kojiro's hairstylist friend (Kazuma Sano) into the Negative Jeweler Neguserin (ネグセリン). Miracle Tunes defeats him and recovers the Hip Hop Jewel.
9	"Tune Up with the Hip Hop Jewel!"; Transliteration: "Hippu Hoppu Jueru de Chūn Appu!" (Japanese: ヒップホップジュエルでチューンアップ！)	Yoshitaka Yamauchi	Kana Matsui	May 28, 2017
Seitaro, Mai's father, returns from overseas and invites Mai to watch him conduct an orchestra. While Mai is at the concert, two birthday party entertainers (Afro Goto and Junichi Takahashi) are turned into the Negative Jewelers Yo One and Yo Two. Mai decides to leave to help Kanon and Fuka, and they use the Hip Hop Jewel to purify the Negative Jewelers. After recovering the Rock Jewel, Mai returns in time for her father's concert and bids him farewell when he leaves the country again.
10	"Save Daddy with the Rock Jewel!"; Transliteration: "Rokku Jueru de Papa wo Sukue!" (Japanese: ロックジュエルでパパを救え！)	Yoshitaka Yamauchi	Kana Matsui	June 4, 2017
While Miracle² is interviewed on radio, Imamoto (Akihiro Kakuta), Kanon's father's old bandmate, is turned into the Negative Jeweler Mimizawari. Miracle Tunes uses the Rock Jewel to purify him and recover the Techno Jewel. However, their excitement is short-lived when they are notified that KariKari, a pop idol duo from the United States consisting of sisters Akari and Hikari Shiratori, will be debuting in Japan.
11	"The Rivals Appear! Seize the Future with the Techno Jewel!"; Transliteration: "Raibaru Tōjō! Tekuno Jueru de Mirai wo Tsukame!" (Japanese: ライバル登場！テクノジュエルで未来を掴め！)	Yoshitaka Yamauchi	Hisako Fujihira	June 11, 2017
Mai and Fuka are concerned about KariKari, whose popularity threatens their ability to gather Harmony Energy, while Kanon's classmates advise her to get her future told by the techno fortune teller, Jupiter Kazuo (Satoshi Judai). Jupiter Kazuo is turned into the Negative Jeweler Senrigan, whose fortunes all lead to a dismal future for each of his clients. Miracle Tunes use the Techno Jewel to defeat him and recover the Reggae Jewel.
12	"A Declaration of Rivalry from KariKari"; Transliteration: "KariKari kara Raibaru Sengen" (Japanese: カリカリからライバル宣言)	Yoshitaka Yamauchi	Mao Aoki	June 18, 2017
Fuka is upset at her parents cancelling their visit home, and while a parent-teacher meeting takes place at their school, Mr. Sakurai is turned into the Negative Jeweler Sunegajiri. Miracle Tunes defeats him by having Mai answer his questions correctly, and they recover the Castanet Jewel. Afterwards, Fuka receives a doll in the mail from her parents and makes amends with Kanon.
13	"A Prelude to a Decisive Match"; Transliteration: "Kessen he no Pureryūdo" (Japanese: 決戦へのプレリュード)	Kenichiro Nishiumi	Mao Aoki	June 25, 2017
Miracle² and KariKari perform on the music competition program, Music Coliseum. Meanwhile, Kojiro becomes a guest on Chris Maeda's (Ken'ya Ōsumi) fitness program. When Chris turns into the Negative Jeweler Taishibo, Miracle Tunes defeat him and recover the Salsa Jewel, with the Shiratori sisters and Komuragaeri discovering their secret.
14	"New Warriors Are Born! Harmony of Miracles"; Transliteration: "Arata na Senshi Tanjō! Kiseki no Hāmonī" (Japanese: 新たな戦士誕生！ 奇跡のハーモニー)	Kenichiro Nishiumi	Hisako Fujihira	July 2, 2017
Now that the Dokudoku-dan know Miracle Tunes' true identities, they force Miracle² into a predicament by transforming a reporter (Wakana Matsumoto) into the Negative Jeweler Kikimimitatecchi when the girls are scheduled to perform. Akari and Hikari volunteer to fight instead, with Alm and Sopra offering their Sound Jewels to them. They defeat the Negative Jeweler to recover the Waltz Jewel. After they return to the filming location, Sawanobori announces that both teams have won the competition, since Akari and Hikari are now part of Miracle².
15	"The Press Conference of the Reborn Miracle Miracle"; Transliteration: "Shinsei Mirakuru Mirakuru no Kishakaiken" (Japanese: 新生・ミラクルミラクルの記者会見)	Kenichiro Nishiumi	Hisako Fujihira	July 9, 2017
With Akari and Hikari as the group's new members, Miracle² holds a press conference. During the press conference, a reporter (Kouichi Oohori) is turned into the Negative Jeweler Tabesugi. Akari uses her Miracle Tambourine to activate a barrier to protect Miracle Tunes, and they defeat him, recovering the Ballad Jewel.
16	"Echo! Hikari's Tambourine"; Transliteration: "Hibike! Hikari no Tanbarin" (Japanese: 響け！ヒカリのタンバリン)	Takeshi Yokoi	Kana Matsui	July 16, 2017
While recording Miracle²'s new song, "Jump!", Mizoochi turns the song producer (Hiroshi Yamamoto) into the Negative Jeweler Anotekonote, who puts Sawanobori under his control and attacks Hikari. Miracle Tunes defeat him with the Techno Jewel to recover the Maracas Jewel.
17	"Big Panic at the New Song's Live Performance!"; Transliteration: "Shin Kyoku Raibu de Dai Panikku!" (Japanese: 新曲ライブで大パニック！)	Kenichiro Nishiumi	Mao Aoki	July 23, 2017
Miracle² holds a performance at Kamome Records to celebrate the release of their newest single, where it is rumored that idols who perform there will experience success. During the performance, the Dokudoku-dan turns the manager (Takeyasu Komiya) into the Negative Jeweler Kowamote. Miracle Tunes defeats him, recovering the Enka Jewel. The Dokudoku-dan steal a bag full of lunches that they mistook for the Sound Jewel Case, believing they were tricked as they formally declare war on Miracle².
18	"Tune Up with the Enka Jewel!"; Transliteration: "Enka Jueru de Chūn Appu!" (Japanese: 演歌ジュエルでチューンアップ！)	Takeshi Yokoi	Mao Aoki	July 30, 2017
Miracle² is performing with Ayame Jindaiji (Nobue Iketani), a famous enka singer, on a music show, with Fuka's grandparents attending the show in support. Ayame is turned into the Negative Jeweler Yanagigoshi. Miracle Tunes uses the Enka Jewel to tune her up, recovering the Horn Jewel. Meanwhile, Mizoochi infiltrates Miracle²'s dorm, only to be accosted by Kojiro.
19	"A Love Premonition at the Firework Festival?!"; Transliteration: "Hanabi Taikai de Koi no Yokan!?" (Japanese: 花火大会で恋の予感！？)	Takeshi Yokoi	Kana Matsui	August 6, 2017
Ryo invites Miracle² to his agency's building to watch the fireworks. Komuragaeri turns the CEO (Yoshiki Arizono) and his wife (Miho Ninagawa) into the Negative Jewelers Wagamonogaozu. Kanon and Ryo are trapped in the elevator as Wagamonogaozu spreads a Negative Aura to the other guests, but once they are able to escape, Miracle Tunes purify and recover the Drum Jewel.
20	"Ghosts at the Thrilling Summer Training Camp"; Transliteration: "Obake de Dokkiri Natsu Gasshuku" (Japanese: お化けでドッキリ夏合宿)	Takeshi Yokoi	Mao Aoki	August 13, 2017
Miracle² trains at a temple in the mountains and share ghost stories at bedtime, but they become frightened navigating the temple at night. With his group taking summer vacation, Komuragaeri decides to sneak into the temple and turns the priest (Yoichi Nukumizu) into the Negative Jeweler Nodobotoke to scare Miracle Tunes. But Komuragaeri mistakes Yuzuhara for a ghost and ends up getting himself lost in the woods while Miracle Tunes recover the Punk Jewel.
21	"Explosive Laughter?! Comedian Audition"; Transliteration: "Bakushō!? Owarai Ōdition" (Japanese: 爆笑！？お笑いオーディション)	Takeshi Yokoi	Hisako Fujihira	August 20, 2017
Miracle² become judges for a comedian audition. Nechigae infiltrates the audition and turns Kojiro into the Negative Jeweler Kuchibiru Pururun to act on his obsession for young men. Though Miracle Tunes purify Kojiro and recover the Harmonica Jewel, the stylist is abducted by the Dokudoku-dan.
22	"Let's Get Kojiro Back!"; Transliteration: "Kojirō-san wo Torimodose!" (Japanese: コジローさんを取り戻せ！)	Takeshi Yokoi	Hisako Fujihira	August 27, 2017
Kanon receives a ransom note during Miracle²'s handshake event demanding the Sound Jewel Case in exchange for Kojiro, though Kojiro escapes on his own. She secretly takes the Sound Jewel Case to the Dokudoku-dan. The Dokudoku-dan turn a construction worker (Kanji Tsuda) into the Negative Jeweler Hofukuzettoka to steal the Sound Jewel Case. But girls come to Kanon's rescue as they take the Sound Jewel Case back and assume Rock Mode to purify Hofukuzettoka while recovering the Metal Jewel.
23	"No Way?! Yuzuhara Tunes Up?"; Transliteration: "Masaka!? Yuzuhara-san ga Chūn Appu?" (Japanese: まさか!?柚原さんがチューンアップ?)	Kenichiro Nishiumi	Kana Matsui	September 3, 2017
Miracle² is set to film a television segment titled Grab the Miracle. During shooting, Nechigae steals the Sound Jewel Case while turning the director (Yoshiko Inoue) into the Negative Jeweler Haradekke. Miracle Tunes pursues Nechigae and takes back the Sound Jewel Case while Yuzuhara distracts Haradekke, attempting to transform using her Idol Jewel. Miracle Tunes rescue Yuzuhara and recover the Marching Jewel, learning Yuzuhara was once an Idol Warrior years ago.
24	"Kanon, Aiming to be an Artist!"; Transliteration: "Kanon, Āto ni Mezameru!" (Japanese: カノン、アートにめざめる！)	Kenichiro Nishiumi	Mao Aoki	September 10, 2017
While Kanon's class is having art class outside, Komuragaeri infiltrates her school and turns the guest art teacher (Toru Tezuka) into the Negative Jeweler Shinbigan, who uses the students under his control to draw clones of him. Miracle Tunes purify him and recover the Ocarina Jewel.
25	"Mommy's Cake is in Big Trouble!"; Transliteration: "Mama no Kēki ga Dai Pinchi!" (Japanese: ママのケーキが大ピンチ！)	Kenichiro Nishiumi	Kana Matsui	September 17, 2017
Miracle² film a Grab the Miracle segment at the Montana sweets cafe where Kanon's mother works at. But Nechigae turns the shop assistants into the Negative Jewelers Mushiba and Sashiba, who sabotage the cakes the girls were to eat. Once Yuzuhara got the camera crew distracted, Miracle Tunes assume Hip-Hop Mode to purify the Negative Jewelers during a rap battle and recover the Opera Jewel. The girls are unaware that Mrs. Ichinose witnessed their fight once she finished a new cakes for them, keeping their secret while asking Kanon to come to her if she ever has troubles.
26	"The Revival of the Crystal Melody Box!"; Transliteration: "Kurisutari Merodi Bokkusu Fukkatsu!" (Japanese: クリスタルメロディボックス復活！)	Kenichiro Nishiumi	Hisako Fujihira	September 24, 2017
Miracle² celebrates Mai's birthday, and she receives her mother's CD in the mail. Together with Mai, Miracle² reminisces the times when they first became Idol Warriors. Meanwhile, the Goddess finally fixed the Crystal Melody Box.
27	"Take Them Back! The 5 Crystal Jewels"; Transliteration: "Torimodose! Itsutsu no Kurisutari Jueru" (Japanese: 取り戻せ！５つのクリスタルジュエル)	Takeshi Yokoi	Hisako Fujihira	October 1, 2017
The Dokudoku-dan invade Miracle²'s dormitory as their final chance to get the Sound Jewels, only to be driven off by Yukie after turning her into the Negative Jeweler Udekikokkun. Miracle Tunes quickly purify Yukie and recover the Tango Jewel. Afterwards, the Goddess of Music gives Mai the Crystal Melody Box, which plays a healing melody once all Sound Jewels have been collected and activates Final Mode once the Crystal Jewels have been found. However, Yuzuhara revealing her team were forced to seal the Crystal Jewels after they have been corrupted, the goddess's mirror is cracked as the result of the aura produced by the Demon King's two new minions as they unsealed the Negative Crystals and scattered them.
28	"Farewell, Dokudoku-dan! A New Enemy Appears"; Transliteration: "Saraba, Dokudoku-dan! Arata na Teki Tōjō" (Japanese: さらば、毒毒団！新たな敵の登場)	Takeshi Yokoi	Hisako Fujihira	October 8, 2017
Finding themselves replaced by Sano and Uno, the dejected Dokudoku-dan disband. Miracle² finds a Negative Aura reading from an underground mall and are led to an old man who transformed into the Super Negative Jeweler Jinzo (Tomio Suga). Jinzo easily overpowers Akari and Hikari, but Mai uses her power to deflect his attack. Miracle Tunes uses the Rock Jewel to defeat him, recovering Mai's Crystal Jewel.
29	"Hikari, Big Trouble as a Mountain Girl!"; Transliteration: "Hikari, Yama Gāru de Dai Pinchi!" (Japanese: ヒカリ、山ガールで大ピンチ！)	Ryusuke Kurahashi	Kana Matsui	October 15, 2017
Hikari becomes restless and determined to find the Crystal Jewels. While Miracle² goes on a hiking trip to Mt. Christa, she tracks down a Negative Aura to find the Super Negative Jeweler Kaizo(Kazuki Namioka). Miracle Tunes use the Hip Hop Jewel to defeat him, with Hikari leading the rap battle, and they recover her Crystal Jewel.
30	"Enka at the Harbor is So Cool!"; Transliteration: "Minato de Enka So cool!" (Japanese: 港で演歌 So cool！)	Takeshi Yokoi	Kana Matsui	October 22, 2017
Miracle² goes to Amerimura village, Akari and Hikari's hometown, to film Grab the Miracle. The Shiratori sisters try to conceal the truth to maintain their image as American popstars, tracing the negative aura afflicting the harbor to the Super Negative Jeweler Suizo (Takahiro Kuroishi). Miracle Tunes purify him with the Enka Jewel and recover Akari's Crystal Jewel, with her and her sister coming clean about being born in Amerimura to their bandmates.
31	"The Last Crystal Jewels"; Transliteration: "Saigo no Kurisutari Jueru" (Japanese: 最後のクリスタルジュエル)	Ryusuke Kurahashi	Mao Aoki	October 29, 2017
With one of the Negative Crystal signatures disappearing, Miracle Tunes head to the Mirai Water Research Laboratory, Miracle Tunes to face the Super Negative Jeweler Hizo (Shinichi Takamatsu). But it turned out to be a trap when the Super Negative Jeweler Shinzo (Akira Shinomiya) appears and injures Mai. The girls regroup and assume Techno Mode while Hizo and Shinzo combine into the Hyper Negative Jeweler W, with the girls falling back so Mai can heal. The girls exploit W's inner-conflict over whom to attack to purify him back into his components, Kanon and Fuka acquiring the last two Crystal Jewels. With all five Crystal Jewels, Miracle Tunes have acquired the ability to assume Final Mode.
32	"The Powers of Five! Crystal Tune Up"; Transliteration: "Mittsu no Chikara! Kurisutaru Chūn Appu" (Japanese: ５つの力！クリスタルチューンアップ)	Ryusuke Kurahashi	Mao Aoki	November 5, 2017
The Demon Lord commands his bodyguards to deal with Miracle Tunes with Uno earning the right to go first, spreading his Negative Aura at the concert hall where Miracle² will hold their first live tour performance. When the primary Miracle² members regroup with the Shiratori sisters, who were inspecting the concert hall with Sawanobori, they find their attacks ineffective against Uno as he attempts to destroy the building. Kanon suggests entering Final Mode to defeat Uno, their Crystal Tune Up attack purifying him into a turtle. While Miracle² learn that Final Mode exhausts all their gathered Harmony Energy, they intend to replenish it in their first tour concert.
33	"Big Trouble! We Can't Transform into Our Final Mode?"; Transliteration: "Dai Pinchi! Fainaru Mōdo ni Henshin Dekinai?" (Japanese: 大ピンチ！ファイナルモードに変身できない？)	Ryusuke Kurahashi	Hisako Fujihira	November 12, 2017
After their first live tour performance, Miracle² are alerted to a large negative aura from a parking lot and encounter Sano when he captures Kanon and Fuka while they and the others split up. Learning the all five of them need to be together to use the Crystal Jewels, Mai and Shiratori sisters are overwhelmed by Sano's speed before Mai has Akari and Hikari deflect her attacks against Sano to free their friends. Miracle Tunes quickly enter Final Mode and purify Sano, turning him into a rabbit with his defeat restoring the Goddess's mirror.
34	"A Big Strategy to Surprise Kanon!"; Transliteration: "Kanon ni Sapuraizu Dai Sakusen!" (Japanese: カノンにサプライズ大作戦！)	Takeshi Yokoi	Hisako Fujihira	November 19, 2017
The girls prepare a surprise birthday party for Kanon as they recount the times they recovered the Hip Hop, Rock, Techno, and Enka Jewels and gained their powered-up forms along with Final Mode.
35	"A Comeback, the Dokudoku-dan Has Returned!"; Transliteration: "Fukkatsu, Kaettekita Dokudoku-dan!" (Japanese: 復活、帰ってきた毒毒団！)	Takeshi Yokoi	Kana Matsui	November 26, 2017
Kanon is set to make her acting debut in the drama Samurai Boy and trains in kendo with Ryo. Meanwhile, the Dokudoku-dan have returned and transform the kendo instructor into the Negative Jeweler Futokoro Gattana. Miracle Tunes defeat him with Final Mode, recovering the Taiko Jewel.
36	"Yukie is a Famous Actress?!"; Transliteration: "Yukie-san wa Dai Joyū!?" (Japanese: 雪江さんは大女優！？)	Takeshi Yokoi	Kana Matsui	December 3, 2017
Shooting for Samurai Boy begins, but Kanon offends veteran actress Ruriko Himenaga (Akiko Hinagata) with her lack of experience and by accidentally mistaking her for Yukie. Mizoochi turns Ruriko into the Negative Jeweler Nakibokuro, who flees into the forest. Miracle Tunes use Final Mode and recover the Classic Jewel. Kanon vows to Ruriko that she will work harder, while unbeknownst to them, Yukie had acted in place for Ruriko while they were gone.
37	"Tune Up at the Dance Battle!"; Transliteration: "Dansu Batoru de Chūn Appu!" (Japanese: ダンスバトルでチューンアップ！)	Kenichiro Nishiumi	Mao Aoki	December 10, 2017
Fuka gets angry with Kanon over making mistakes during their dance lessons. Meanwhile, their dance instructor is turned into the Negative Jeweler Chidoriashi. Fuka defeats her in a dance battle, and Miracle Tunes recovers the Flamenco Jewel. Afterwards, Fuka apologizes to Kanon and they make up.
38	"Save Everyone's Christmas!"; Transliteration: "Mamore! Minna no Kurisumasu" (Japanese: 守れ！みんなのクリスマス)	Kenichiro Nishiumi	Mao Aoki	December 17, 2017
The Dokudoku-dan turn LuckToy CEO (Tetsu Watanabe) into the Negative Jeweler Yokunokawatsupari. Luckily, Miracle²'s Christmas event changes locations to LuckToy and use their performance to they purify him in Final Mode and recover the Handbell Jewel, later returning for an encore performance.
39	"A Crystal Tune Up That Fulfills Our Hearts!"; Transliteration: "Kokoro wo Mitasu Kurisutaru Chūn Appu!" (Japanese: 心を満たすクリスタルチューンアップ！)	Kenichiro Nishiumi	Mao Aoki	December 23, 2017
Miracle² makes vegetable stamps and read fan letters as they recount the times they each found their own Crystal Jewel and used Final Mode. At the same time, they discuss the Demon King's next step. This episode is a clip show.
40	"A Challenge Towards the Idol Warrior Test!"; Transliteration: "Aidoru Senshi Tesuto ni Chōsen!" (Japanese: アイドル戦士テストに挑戦！)	Ryusuke Kurahashi	Mao Aoki	December 24, 2017
Miracle Tunes is summoned to the Music Kingdom, where they are quizzed by the Music Kingdom's fairy Rinrin (Akiko Hinagata) to see if they are worthy of being Idol Warriors. After passing the test, Kanon wakes up to realize it was a dream. This episode is a clip show.
41	"The Demon King Appears! The Greatest Crisis"; Transliteration: "Ma-ō Tōjō! Saidai no Pinchi!" (Japanese: 魔王登場！最大のピンチ！)	Ryusuke Kurahashi	Hisao Fujihira	January 7, 2018
Miracle² celebrates Fuka's birthday. While practicing in the park, the Demon King appears in the real world via Komuragaeri's invention, spreading an intense Negative Aura. Miracle Tunes use Final Mode to defeat him, but he reappears behind them to steal Kanon's Crystal Jewel and shoot her with a ray of Negative Aura.
42	"Decisive Match! Manager VS Manager?!"; Transliteration: "Kessen! Manējā VS Manējā!?" (Japanese: 決戦！マネージャーVSマネージャー！？)	Ryusuke Kurahashi	Mao Aoki	January 14, 2018
Kanon has problems with her voice, while Ryo's manager Shiomi (Tomoya Maeno) hospitalized after fallen ill with the Dokudoku-danm turning him into the Negative Jeweler Doguzettsu. Miracle Tunes use the Hip Hop Jewel, but Kanon is unable to resist his attacks. Yuzuhara intervenes to weaken Doguzettsu, and Miracle Tunes defeat him to recover the Jazz Jewel. However, Kanon has lost her voice from exposure to the Negative Aura after the Demon King had shot her.
43	"Take It Back! The Harmony of Five"; Transliteration: "Torimodose! Go-nin no Hāmonī" (Japanese: 取り戻せ！５人のハーモニー)	Yoshitaka Yamaguchi	Mao Aoki	January 21, 2018
After Kanon loses her voice, rumors of her leaving Miracle² begin to surface. However, when her fans support her during Miracle²'s fan meeting, one of them is turned into the Negative Jeweler Mayutsubamon. Kanon's determination to save her fans earns her voice back, with Miracle Tunes entering Rock Mode to purify the Negative Jeweler and recover the Pop Jewel.
44	"Fuka, Debuting in America as a Dancer?!"; Transliteration: "Fūka, Dansu de Amerika Debyū!?" (Japanese: フウカ、ダンスでアメリカデビュー！？)	Yoshitaka Yamaguchi	Mao Aoki	January 28, 2018
Fuka is given the opportunity to become a dancer in the United States and must decide between pursuing her dream or staying as an Idol Warrior. Meanwhile, Komuragaeri turns a tour guide (Barbie) into the Negative Jeweler Herazuguchi, who spreads a Negative Aura onto the other tourists. Fuka makes the decision to stay in Japan and arrives to help Miracle Tunes, entering Enka Mode to captivate the tourists while purifying Herazuguchi to recover the Bossa Nova Jewel.
45	"Mai's Sweet Valentine"; Transliteration: "Mai no Suīto Barentain" (Japanese: マイのスイートバレンタイン)	Takeshi Yokoi	Kana Matsui	February 4, 2018
Mai wants to recreate a chocolate cake that her mother made for Valentine's Day to give to her father. Meanwhile, Nechigae turns a shop assistant (Nonoka Ono) into the Negative Jeweler Mune Kyunkyun. Miracle Tunes defeat her to recover the Cello Jewel. Afterwards, when Mai gives her father the cake, she discovers that he knows the song of the Crystal Melody Box and learns that the Goddess of Music, who had composed it, is her mother.
46	"Oh, No! The Close Sisters Get into a Big Fight"; Transliteration: "Ō Nō! Nakayoshi Kyōdai no Ōgenka" (Japanese: オーノー！仲良し姉妹の大ゲンカ)	Takeshi Yokoi	Kana Matsui	February 11, 2018
The Shiratori sisters are set to appear in the magazine, Lovely Farm, but Akari rejects the job due to her fear of earthworms. Hikari is disappointed by her lack of professionalism and confides in Komuragaeri, who has gotten into a fight with Nechigae. Realizing how hard Hikari is working, Akari reconsiders the job. However, one of the farmers is turned into the Negative Jeweler Daikon Asshi. Miracle Tunes purify her in Techno Mode and recover the Triangle Jewel.
47	"Aim to Become the Best Idol in the World!"; Transliteration: "Mezase Aidoru Sekai Ichi!" (Japanese: 目指せアイドル世界一！)	Takeshi Yokoi	Hisako Fujihira	February 18, 2018
Miracle² is set to represent Japan on World Idol Battle, where they will be competing with idols around the world. Meanwhile, Nechigae has targeted Kanon's classmates and put them under control with her song. Miracle Tunes rescue them with their own song and dance and fight Nechigae, but she is rescued by Mizoochi and Komuragaeri. The Dokudoku-dan defeat Miracle Tunes and flee, warning them that they will summon the Demon King to Earth soon.
48	"It's Complete! The Dokudoku-dan's Ultimate Weapon"; Transliteration: "Kansei! Dokudoku-dan no Saishūheiki" (Japanese: 完成！毒毒団の最終兵器)	Kenichiro Nishiumi	Kana Matsui	March 4, 2018
The Dokudoku-dan finish building a machine to summon the Demon King to Earth while recounting their failures. The Goddess of Music warns Miracle² that the Demon King may arrive soon. This episode is a clip show.
49	"At Last! The Final Decisive Match at the Idol Battle"; Transliteration: "Iza! Aidoru Batoru de Saishū Kessen" (Japanese: いざ！アイドルバトルで最終決戦)	Yoshitaka Yamaguchi	Hisako Fujihira	March 11, 2018
The World Idol Battle begins and all of Miracle²'s friends and families watch in support. During Miracle²'s performance, the Demon King and the Dokudoku-dan appear at the studio, spreading a Negative Aura around the world. Miracle² is forced to transform in front of the audience, but the Demon King defeats them, petrifying the Rhythms and striking everyone except Kanon with a Negative Aura. Realizing the cameras are still filming the show, Kanon confesses that Miracle² is Miracle Tunes.
50	"Resound! The Harmony of Miracles"; Transliteration: "Hibike! Kiseki no Hāmonī" (Japanese: 響け！奇跡のハーモニー)	Yoshitaka Yamaguchi, Takeshi Yokoi, Kenichiro Nishiumi, Ryusuke Kurahashi	Hisako Fujihira	March 18, 2018
Kanon tells the audience about Miracle Tunes and faces the Demon King, resisting his Negative Aura while inspiring the other girls to break free from his influence and face him with a song. Their friends, families, and the Dokudoku-dan join them in support. The song weakens the Demon King and Kanon's Crystal Jewel returns to her, allowing Miracle Tunes to use Final Mode as they use the completed Song of Blessings to purify the Demon King.
51	"Miracle Tunes! Will Be There Forever"; Transliteration: "Mirakuru Chūnzu! wa Eien ni" (Japanese: ミラクルちゅーんず！は永遠に)	Yoshitaka Yamaguchi	Hisako Fujihira	March 25, 2018
Miracle Tunes celebrates their victory, but the Rhythms and Yukie return to the Music Kingdom. The Dokudoku-dan tells Miracle² that they are debuting as idols as the Wakuwaku-dan, with the reformed Demon King as their leader. At night, the Goddess of Music appears to Miracle², thanking them for their help and telling them they will no longer be Idol Warriors before departing. When Miracle² wakes up, they run to the mirror to thank the Goddess.

== Specials ==
No.	Title	Director	Writer	Original air date
Special	"Make a Miracle!: Until Miracle Tunes! is Made"; Transliteration: "Meiku a Mirakuru! Mirakuru Chūnzu! ga Dekiru Made" (Japanese: メイク ア ミラクル！～ミラクルちゅーんず！ができるまで～)	Unknown	Unknown	September 1, 2017
This is a documentary featuring behind-the-scenes footage of audition videos and rehearsals of the main cast.

== Home media ==
Kadokawa released several region 2 DVDs for rental as the series was airing. After the show's end, the episodes were collected and released at major retailers as region 2 DVD sets, which also contained extras such as behind-the-scenes footage, press conferences, and events.

=== Rental ===
Title	Episodes	DVD release date	Product code	JAN
Idol × Warrior Miracle Tunes! Rental vol.1	1-3	October 4, 2017	ZMBZ-11501R	4935228166923
Idol × Warrior Miracle Tunes! Rental vol.2	4-7	November 8, 2017	ZMBZ-11502R	4935228166930
Idol × Warrior Miracle Tunes! Rental vol.3	8-11	December 6, 2017	ZMBZ-11503R	4935228166947
Idol × Warrior Miracle Tunes! Rental vol.4	12-15	January 10, 2018	ZMBZ-11504R	4935228166954
Idol × Warrior Miracle Tunes! Rental vol.5	16-19	February 7, 2018	ZMBZ-11505R	4935228166961
Idol × Warrior Miracle Tunes! Rental vol.6	20-23	March 2, 2018	ZMBZ-11506R	4935228166978
Idol × Warrior Miracle Tunes! Rental vol.7	24-27	April 4, 2018	ZMBZ-11507R	4935228166985
Idol × Warrior Miracle Tunes! Rental vol.8	28-31	May 2, 2018	ZMBZ-12018R	4935228174058
Idol × Warrior Miracle Tunes! Rental vol.9	32-35	May 2, 2018	ZMBZ-12019R	4935228174065
Idol × Warrior Miracle Tunes! Rental vol.10	36-39	June 6, 2018	ZMBZ-12020R	4935228174072
Idol × Warrior Miracle Tunes! Rental vol.11	40-43	July 4, 2018	ZMBZ-12021R	4935228174089
Idol × Warrior Miracle Tunes! Rental vol.12	44-47	July 4, 2018	ZMBZ-12022R	4935228174096
Idol × Warrior Miracle Tunes! Rental vol.13	48-51	August 3, 2018	ZMBZ-12023R	4935228174102

=== Box sets ===
Title	Episodes	DVD release date	Product code	Peak chart positions	Sales
Title	Episodes	DVD release date	Product code	JPN	Sales
Idol × Warrior Miracle Tunes! DVD Box vol.1	1-15	January 24, 2018	ZMSZ-11861	19	1,444+
Idol × Warrior Miracle Tunes! DVD Box vol.2	16-35	May 25, 2018	ZMSZ-12152	15	—
Idol × Warrior Miracle Tunes! DVD Box vol.3	36-51	August 24, 2018	ZMSZ-12393	13	1,291+
