= Tesshō Genda =

Japanese actor (born 1948)

- 玄田 哲章
- Born: Mitsuo Yokoi; May 20, 1948 (age 78); Okayama Prefecture, Japan
- Occupations: Actor; voice actor; narrator
- Years active: 1970–present
- Agent: 81 Produce

Tesshō Genda (玄田 哲章, Genda Tesshō; born May 20, 1948) (sometimes credited as Tessyou Genda, Tetsuaki Genda, or Tetsusyo Genda) is a Japanese actor, voice actor and narrator. He is employed by the talent management firm 81 Produce. When he debuted, he used his real name, Mitsuo Yokoi (横居 光雄, Yokoi Mitsuo) as artist name. Because he had experience with ballet, he was known by the nickname "Pirouette Genda." Genda is one of Japan's most prolific voice actors, with 234 roles credited to his name as of September 25, 2007.

Genda has performed the roles of Masami Iwaki (Dokaben), Suppaman (Dr. Slump), Gō Reietsu (High School! Kimengumi), Optimus Prime (A.K.A. Convoy) (The Transformers), Umibouzu (City Hunter), Ichimi Araiwa (Cooking Papa), and Action Kamen (Crayon Shin-chan) and is the current Japanese voice of Tigger in Winnie the Pooh media. He is also known for voicing Kurama in Naruto, and Kaido in One Piece.

Like his Canadian counterpart Peter Cullen, Genda reprised the role of Optimus Prime (Convoy) in the Japanese dub of the 2007 Transformers movie. He is best known as the Japanese voice of Batman in numerous animated television series and animated films. Like his American counterpart Kevin Conroy, Genda reprised the role of Batman in the Japanese dub of Batman: Gotham Knight. He voices Kratos in the Japanese versions of the God of War video game series.

In February 2010, Genda received a Merit Award from the 4th Seiyu Awards.

He is the official dub-over artist of Arnold Schwarzenegger and has met with Schwarzenegger several times. He is a standard choice for Japanese dubbing of the voices of such English-speaking actors as Samuel L. Jackson, John Goodman, Dan Aykroyd, Laurence Fishburne, and Gérard Depardieu. He was the first dubbing actor for Sylvester Stallone and Steven Seagal in their early days.

== Filmography ==
The roles below are listed in chronological order, with the show title in italics followed by the dates of the series and the characters' names in parentheses.

=== Animation ===
==== Television ====
1970s

- Science Ninja Team the Gatchaman (1972–1974, too many minor Galactor characters to list)
- Brave Raideen (1975–1976, God Raideen, Danny Amagai)
- Dokaben (1976–1979, Masami Iwaki)
- Chōdenji Machine Voltes V (1977–1978, Daijirou Gou)
- Cyborg 009 (1979–2001, Mack, Man in Black, Thunder)
- King Arthur (1979, Lancelot)
- Mobile Suit Gundam (1979–1980, Slegger Law, Reed)

1980s

- The Wonderful Adventures of Nils (1980–1981, Golgo)
- Uchū Taitei God Sigma (1980, Kensaku Yoshinaga)
- Dogtanian and the Three Muskehounds (1981, Porthos)
- Around the World with Willy Fog (1981, Mr. Sullivan)
- Hyakujūō Golion (1981–1982, Tsuyoshi Seidō) (Hunk -Voltron)
- Dr. Slump: Arale-chan (1981–1986, Suppaman)
- Urusei Yatsura (1981–1986, Rei)
- Mirai Keisatsu Urashiman (1983, Stinger Wolf)
- Miyuki (1983–1984, Torao Nakata)
- Transformers (1984–1987, Convoy/Optimus Prime, Omega Supreme)
- High School! Kimengumi (1985–1987, Reietsu Gō)
- The Transformers (1985, Convoy)
- Mobile Suit Gundam ZZ (1986–1987, Gemon Bajakku, Desert Rommel)
- Dragon Ball (1986–1989, Shu, General White)
- Saint Seiya (1986–1989, Taurus Aldebaran)
- City Hunter (1987–1991, Umibouzu: Hayato Ishūin, Falcon)
- Kamen no Ninja Akakage (1987 -1988, Shirokage)
- Mashin Hero Wataru (1988, Ryūjinmaru, Ryūōmaru)
- Meimon! Daisan Yakyūbu (1988, Takeshi Kaidō)
- The Adventures of Peter Pan (1989, Alf)
- Parasol Henbē (1989–1991, Gorita)

1990s

- Mashin Hero Wataru 2 (1990, New Ryūjinmaru, Ryūseimaru, Banharu)
- Moomin (1990, Hobgoblin)
- 21 Emon (1991, Scanray)
- Saban's Adventures of the Little Mermaid (1991, Duhdlee)
- Honō no Tōkyūji: Dodge Danpei (1991–1992, Tamajūrō Ichigeki)
- Nangoku Shōnen Papuwa-kun (1992–1993, Itō)
- Cooking Papa (1992–1995, Ichimi Araiwa)
- YuYu Hakusho (1993–1994, Younger Toguro (Ototo))
- Crayon Shin-chan (1992–current, Action Kamen)
- Magic Knight Rayearth (1994–1995, Selece)
- City Hunter: The Secret Service (1996, Umibōzu)
- Midori no Makibaō (1996, Cascade)
- The Vision of Escaflowne (1996, Balgus)
- Dragon Ball GT (1996–1997, Shū)
- City Hunter: Goodbye My Sweetheart (1997, Umibōzu)
- Chōmashin Eiyūden Wataru (1997–1998, Ryūjinmaru)
- Dr. Slump: Arale-chan (1997–1999, Suppaman)
- AWOL: Absent Without Leave (1998, Jim Hyatt)
- Cowboy Bebop (1998–1999, Domino Walker)
- City Hunter: Death of the Vicious Criminal Ryo Saeba (1999, Umibōzu)
- Kakyūsei (Elf edition) (1999, Sadaoka)
- The Big O (1999–2000, Dan Dastun)
- Cybersix (1999–2000, Lucas)

2000s

- Baby Felix (2001, Bull)
- Haré+Guu (2001, Boar)
- Mahoromatic (2001–2003, Yūichirō Konoe)
- Rave Master (2001–2002, Gale Leagrove)
- Z.O.E. Dolores, I (2001, James Lynx)
- Naruto (2002–2021, Kurama)
- The Big O (2003, Dan Dastun)
- Wolf's Rain (2003, Sea Walrus)
- Zatch Bell! (2003–2006, Professor D'Artagnan)
- Agatha Christie's Great Detectives Poirot and Marple (2004–2005, Kelvin)
- Transformers Super Link (2004–2005, Primus)
- Yakitate!! Japan (2004–2006, Tsuyoshi Mokoyama)
- Tōhai Densetsu Akagi (2005–2006, Yasuoka)
- Angel Heart (2005–2006, Umibozu/Falcon)
- Transformers Galaxy Force (2005–2006, Primus)
- My Bride Is a Mermaid (2007, Luna's Father)
- Kenichi: The Mightiest Disciple (2007, Sogetsu Ma)
- Shin Mazinger (2009, Narrator, Cross)
- Sengoku Basara: Samurai Kings (2009, Shingen Takeda)

2010s

- Heroman (2010, Brian Carter Jones)
- Panty & Stocking with Garterbelt (2010, Cocktimus Prime(Japanese:Ostimus Surprise))
- Sengoku Basara: Samurai Kings II (2010, Shingen Takeda)
- Stitch! ~Best Friends Forever~ (2011, Ace (ep. 29, 30))
- Smile PreCure! (2012–2013, Emperor Pierrot)
- Kingdom (2012–2014, Lü Buwei/Ryo Fui)
- JoJo's Bizarre Adventure: Stardust Crusaders (2014, Captain Tennille's impersonator)
- Fate/kaleid liner Prisma Illya (2014, Auguste)
- Black Bullet (2014, Nagamasa Gadō)
- Sengoku Basara: Judge End (2014, Shingen Takeda)
- Tokyo ESP (2014, Hotokeda)
- Gonna be the Twin-Tail!! (2014, Lizadgildy)
- Sword Art Online II (2014, Thor)
- Sabagebu! (2014, narrator, store manager)
- Death Parade (2015, Oculus)
- My Love Story!! (2015, Yutaka Gouda)
- Ninja Slayer From Animation (2015, Clone Yakuza)
- Rin-ne (2015, Narrator)
- Saint Seiya: Soul of Gold (2015, Taurus Aldebaran)
- Fairy Tail (2015, Warrod Sequen)
- The Testament of Sister New Devil BURST (2015, Ramsus)
- Dragon Ball Super (2015–2018, Shū)
- One-Punch Man (2015–2019, Metal Knight)
- One Piece (2016–current, Kaido)
- The Heroic Legend of Arslan: Dust Storm Dance (2016, Toqtomish)
- Taboo Tattoo (2016, Colonel Sanders)
- March Comes in like a Lion (2016, Takanori Jingūji)
- Yōjo Senki: Saga of Tanya the Evil (2017, Kurt von Rudersdorf)
- Boruto: Naruto Next Generations (2017–2021, Kurama)
- The Laughing Salesman NEW (2017, Fukuzō Moguro)
- Princess Principal (2017, Beatrice (imitating voice, others by Fukushi Ochiai and Motomu Kiyokawa), "Jake") (ep. 4))
- Pop Team Epic (2018, Popuko (ep. 4-B))
- Mitsuboshi Colors (2018, Daigorou "Oyaji" Kujiraoka (eps. 1 – 6, 9 – ))
- Mr. Tonegawa: Middle Management Blues (2018, Shinanogawa (ep 23))
- Afterlost (2019, Kaibara)
- I'm From Japan (2019, Masurao Kikuchi)
- Isekai Quartet (2019, Ludeldorf)
- How Heavy Are the Dumbbells You Lift? (2019, Barnold Shortisnator, Narrator)
- Kochoki: Wakaki Nobunaga (2019, Saitō Dōsan)

2020s

- Seton Academy: Join the Pack! (2020, Gigasu Terano-sensei, Narrator)
- Oda Cinnamon Nobunaga (2020, Takeda Lucky Shingen)
- Auto Boy - Carl from Mobile Land (2020, Pops)
- Dragon Goes House-Hunting (2021, Letty's father)
- Summer Time Rendering (2022, Alan Kofune)
- Dragon Quest: The Adventure of Dai (2022, Maximum)
- Ayakashi Triangle (2023, Shirogane)
- Sasaki and Peeps (2024, Sebastian)
- 'Tis Time for "Torture," Princess (2024, Hell-Lord)
- Kaiju No. 8 (2024, Isao Shinomiya)
- 365 Days to the Wedding (2024, Kōichi Ōhara)
- Beastars Final Season (2024, Sagwan)
- Night of the Living Cat (2025, Cat Language Translating Machine)
- Yōjo Senki: Saga of Tanya the Evil II (TBA, Kurt von Rudersdorf)

Unknown date

- Ippatsu Kikijō (Narrator)
- Shōwa Aho Sōshi Akanuke Ichiban! (Hikarikin)
- T.P. Pon (Geira)
- Tentō Mushi no Uta (Jeff)
- Uchū Senshi Baldios (Raita Hokuto)
- Yoroshiku Megadoc (Kiyoshi Noro)
- Yuki no Jōō (Viromu)

==== OVA/ONA ====
- Dallos (1983, Doc McCoy)
- Dragon Century (1985, Sgt. Sagara)
- Prefectural Earth Defense Force (1986, Takei Sukekubo)
- Violence Jack: Harlem Bomber (1986, Violence Jack)
- Space Family Carlvinson (1988, Father)
- Legend of the Galactic Heroes (1988–1997, Karl Gustav Kemp)
- Shin Mashin Eiyūden Wataru: Mashinyama-hen (1989, Ryūjinmaru)
- Little Nemo: Adventures in Slumberland (1989, Nemo's father)
- Gosenzo-sama Banbanzai! (1989–1990, Fumiaki Muroto)
- Mashin Eiyūden Wataru: Owarinaki Toki Monogatari (1993, Ryūjinmaru)
- Record of Lodoss War (1990, Captain Jebra)
- Sol Bianca (1990–1992, Melanion)
- Blazing Transfer Student (1991, Saburō Ibuki)
- RG Veda (1991, Komoku-ten)
- Sohryuden (1991–1993, Saburō Shinkai)
- Mobile Suit Gundam 0083: Stardust Memory (1991–1992, Kelly Layzner)
- Bastard!! Destructive God of Darkness (1992, Gara)
- Konpeki no Kantai (1993–2003, Kurara Ōishi)
- Dōkyūsei (1994–1995, Master)
- Ys: Castle in the Heavens (1995, Dogi)
- Ultraman: Super Fighter Legend (1996, Father of Ultra)
- Mobile Suit Gundam: The 08th MS Team (1996–1999, Terry Sanders Jr.)
- Kyokujitsu Kantai (1997, Kurara Ōishi)
- Golgo 13: Queen Bee (1998, Golgo 13)
- Zaion: I Wish You Were Here (2001, Hajime Kudō)
- Halo Legends (2010, Master Chief (The Package))
- Avengers Confidential: Black Widow & Punisher (2014, Punisher)
- Re:Zero – Starting Life in Another World: Hyōketsu no Kizuna (2019, Melakuera)
- Cute Executive Officer (2021, Tanryūsai Suda)
- The Heike Story (2021, Taira no Kiyomori)
- Hanma Baki - Son of Ogre (2021, Saman)

==== Theater ====
- 11 Nin Iru! (1986, Ganigus Gagtos)
- Akira (1988, Ryūsaku)
- Dragon Ball: Makafushigi Daiboken (1988, Shū)
- City Hunter: .357 Magnum (1989, Umibōzu)
- City Hunter: Bay City Wars (1990, Umibōzu)
- City Hunter: Million Dollar Conspiracy (1990, Umibōzu)
- Dragon Ball Z: Ginga Giri Giri!! Bucchigiri no Sugoi Yatsu (1993, Bojack)
- Bonobono (1993, Higuma no Taisho)
- Crayon Shin-chan: Action Kamen vs Leotard Devil (1993, Action Kamen/Taro Kyogo)
- Dragon Ball Z: Fukkatsu no Fusion!! Gokū to Vegeta (1995), Janemba, Psyche Ogre
- Crayon Shin-chan: Unkokusai's Ambition (1995), Friedkin Tamashiro
- Ghost in the Shell (1995), Chief Nakamura
- Crayon Shin-chan: Adventure in Henderland (1996), Action Kamen
- Crayon Shin-chan: Blitzkrieg! Pig's Hoof's Secret Mission (1998), Kinniku
- Pokémon: The First Movie (1998), Kamex, scientist
- Crayon Shin-chan: Explosion! The Hot Spring's Feel Good Final Battle (1999, Ground Self-Defense Forces Tank Corps Commanding Officer)
- Crayon Shin-chan: The Storm Called The Jungle (2000, Action Kamen/Taro Kyogo)
- Crayon Shin-chan: The Storm Called: The Battle of the Warring States (2002, Sakai Hayatonosuke Akitada)
- Crayon Shin-chan: The Storm Called: The Kasukabe Boys of the Evening Sun (2004, Security Commanding Officer)
- Crayon Shin-chan: The Storm Called: The Singing Buttocks Bomb (2007, Ketsudake Commanding Officer)
- Crayon Shin-chan: The Storm Called: The Hero of Kinpoko (2008, Action Kamen)
- Sengoku Basara: The Last Party (2011, Shingen Takeda)
- Asura (2012, Jitō)
- Dragon Ball Z: Kami to Kami (2013, Shū)
- Bayonetta: Bloody Fate (2013, Rodin)
- Appleseed Alpha (2014, Two Horns)
- Dragon Ball Z: Resurrection 'F' (2015, Shū)
- City Hunter The Movie: Shinjuku Private Eyes (2019, Umibōzu)
- Saga of Tanya the Evil: The Movie (2019, Kurt von Rudersdorf)
- Crayon Shin-chan: Crash! Rakuga Kingdom and Almost Four Heroes (2020)
- The Deer King (2021)
- Kukuriraige: Sanxingdui Fantasy (Cancelled)
- City Hunter The Movie: Angel Dust (2023, Umibōzu)

Unknown date

- Densetsu Kyojin Ideon: Hatsudō Hen (Soldier)
- Densetsu Kyojin Ideon: Sesshoku Hen (Professor Yūki)
- Doraemon: Nobita no Makai Daibōken (Kanbu Akuma #A)
- Doraemon: Nobita no Uchū Hyōryūki (Goro Goro)
- Future War 198X (Akita)
- Gekijōban Duel Masters: Yami no Shiro no Maryūkō (Calls of the Death Phoenix) (Agamemunon)
- Gekijōban Tottoko Hamtarō: Ham Ham Paradise! Hamtarō to Fushigi no Oni no Ehontō (Oni-Ham King)
- Hare Tokidoki Buta (Father)
- High School! Kimengumi (Reietsu Gō)
- Kidō Senshi Gundam 0083: Zion no Zankō (Kelly Layzner)
- Kindaichi Shōnen no Jikenbo 2: Satsuriku no Deep Blue (Saitō)
- MAROKO (Bunmei Miroto / Inumaro Yomota)
- Mobile Suit Gundam: The 08th MS Team Miller's Report (Terry Sanders Junior)
- Mobile Suit Gundam: Encounters in Space (Dozle Zabi)
- Kappa no Coo to Natsuyatsumi (Director)
- One Piece: Nejimaki Shima no Bōken (Bear King)
- Saint Seiya: Kamigami no Atsuki Tatakai (Fighter God Rung)
- Soreike! Anpanman: Niji no Pyramid (Amefurioni, Sunao)
- Soreike! Anpanman: Yōsei Lin Lin Himitsu (Sunao)
- Suite Precure♪ The Movie: Take it back! The Miraculous Melody that Connects Hearts (Howling)
- Toire no Hanako-san (Iwao Iwayama)
- Touch 3: Kimi ga Tōrisugita Atoni (Principal)
- Uchū Senshi Baldios (Raita Hokuto)

=== Video games ===
Year	Title	Role	Platform	Source
1993	Yumimi Mix	Narration	Sega CD	
1997	Mega Man Legends	Teisel Bonne	PlayStation, Nintendo 64, Windows, PlayStation Portable	
1997	Tales of Destiny	Mighty Kongman, Tiberius Tōkei	PlayStation, PlayStation 2	
1998	Thousand Arms	Bolt	PlayStation	
2000	Mega Man Legends 2	Teisel Bonne	PlayStation, Windows, PlayStation Portable	
2002	Kingdom Hearts	Tigger	PlayStation 2	
2003	DreamMix TV World Fighters	Convoy/Optimus Prime	GameCube, PlayStation 2	
2005	Namco × Capcom	Unknown Soldier 2P, Mike Haggar	PlayStation 2	
2005	Tales of the Abyss	Largo the Black Lion	PlayStation 2, Nintendo 3DS	
2005	Kingdom Hearts II	Tigger	PlayStation 2	
2006	Dirge of Cerberus: Final Fantasy VII	Azul	PlayStation 2	
2007	Final Fantasy IV	Yang	Nintendo DS, iOS, Android, Windows	
2009	Bayonetta	Rodin	PlayStation 3, Xbox 360, Wii U, Windows, Nintendo Switch	
2010	Kingdom Hearts Birth by Sleep	Tigger	PlayStation Portable	
2010	Xenoblade Chronicles	Xord	Wii, New Nintendo 3DS	
2014	Bayonetta 2	Rodin	Wii U, Nintendo Switch	
2015	Xenoblade Chronicles X	Vandham	Wii U	
2016	Dragon Quest Heroes II	King Orenka	PlayStation 4, PlayStation 3, PlayStation Vita, Windows, Nintendo Switch	
2017	Nioh	Honda Tadakatsu	PlayStation 4, Windows	
2017	Xenoblade Chronicles 2	Vandham	Nintendo Switch	
2017	Fire Emblem Heroes	Surtr, Múspell	Android, iOS	
2018	Super Smash Bros. Ultimate	Rodin	Nintendo Switch	
2019	Kingdom Hearts III	Tigger	PlayStation 4, Xbox One	
2019	Jump Force	Toguro (Younger Brother)	Windows, PlayStation 4, Xbox One	
2020	Nioh 2	Honda Tadakatsu	PlayStation 4, Windows	
2020	One Piece: Pirate Warriors 4	Kaido	PlayStation 4	
2020	Predator: Hunting Grounds	Dutch (Japanese dub)	PlayStation 4, Windows	
2022	Eve: Ghost Enemies	Kiichi Yamagasa	PlayStation 4, Nintendo Switch	
2022	Xenoblade Chronicles 3	Guernica Vandham	Nintendo Switch	
2022	Bayonetta 3	Rodin	Nintendo Switch	
2022	Fitness Boxing: Fist of the North Star	Raoh	Nintendo Switch	
2025	Zenless Zone Zero	Seed Sr.	Windows, iOS, Android, PlayStation 5, Xbox Series X/S	

Unknown dates

- Ajito 3 (Astro Bomber)
- Ar tonelico III (Gengai)
- Capcom Fighting Jam (Zangief)
- Capcom vs. SNK series (Zangief)
- Cobra II: Densetsu no Otoko (Crystal Boy)
- Cobra the Arcade (Gypsy Dog)
- Crayon Shin-chan series (Action Kamen)
- Cyberbots (Gawaine Murdock, Ken Saotome)
- Cyber City Oedo 808: Kemono no Zokusei (Gogol)
- Dragon Ball: Tenkaichi Daibōken (General White, Shū)
- Dragon Ball Z: Infinite World (Janemba)
- Dragon Ball Z: Budokai Tenkaichi (Bojack, Janemba)
- Dragon Ball Z: Budokai Tenkaichi 2 (Bojack, Janemba, Shū)
- Dragon Ball Z: Budokai Tenkaichi 3 (Bojack, Janemba, Shū)
- Dragon Ball Z: Super Butōden 2 (Bojack)
- Everybody's Golf 5 (Kratos)
- Evil Zone (Gally 'Vanish' Gregman)
- Gekitō Pro Yakyū: Shinji Mizushima All-Stars vs. Pro Yakyū (Masami Iwaki)
- Growlanser (Wallace)
- Gundam Battle Chronicle (Dozle Zabi)
- Gundam Battle Royale (Dozle Zabi)
- Harry Potter and the Philosopher's Stone (Rubeus Hagrid) (Japanese dub)
- J-Stars Victory VS (Raoh, Younger Toguro)
- Kaizō Chōjin Shubibinman 3: Ikai no Princess (Bacchi)
- Kessen (Ieyasu Tokugawa)
- Kessen II (Zhang Fei)
- Konjiki no Gash Bell!! Unare! Yūjō no Gekeru 2 (Professor D'Artagnan)
- Konoyo no Ha Tede Koi wo Uta u Shōjo Yu-No (Bask)
- Kūsō Kagaku Sekai Gulliver Boy (Danshaku Mangetsu)
- Last Bronx (Saburo Zaimoku)
- Lego Dimensions (Batman, Bad Cop, Buford "Mad Dog" Tannen) (Japanese dub)
- Mashin Eiyūden Wataru: Another Step (Ryūjinmaru, Tenshō Ryūjinmaru)
- Mobile Suit Gundam: Gihren no Yabō (Slegger Law, Rommel, Kelly Layzner)
- No More Heroes: Heroes' Paradise (Dark Star) (Japanese voice)
- Onimusha 3 (Tadakatsu Heihachirō Honda)
- Phantom Kingdom (The Top of Jashin Valvalga, Mickey)
- PlayStation All-Stars Battle Royale (Kratos) (Japanese dub)
- Quake III Arena (Arena Master Vadrigar) (Japanese dub)
- Mega Man Legends series (Teisel Bonne)
- Mega Man X7 (Soldier Stonekong, Hellride Inobuski)
- Ray Tracers (Raymondo Blody)
- SD Gundam G Generation series (Kelly Layzner, Gemon Bajack, Rommel, Terry Sanders Junior, Dennis Napalm, Breib Cod)
- Sengoku Basara series (Shingen Takeda)
- Shin Super Robot Wars (Jirō Gōdai)
- Soulcalibur: Broken Destiny (Kratos) (Japanese voice)
- SpikeOut Final Edition (White)
- Spyro the Dragon (Dragon) (Japanese dub)
- Star Wars: Galactic Battlegrounds (Mace Windu) (Japanese dub)
- Street Fighter EX series (Guile)
- Super Robot Wars Alpha (Jirō Gōdai, Kelly Layzner)
- Super Robot Wars Alpha Gaiden (Jirō Gōdai)
- Super Robot Wars F (Hannibal Gen, Semūju Shatto)
- Super Robot Wars F: Kanketsu Hen (Slegger Law, Hannibal Gen, Semūju Shatto, Kelly Layzner)
- Super Robot Wars UX (Deus Ex Machina)
- Super Smash Bros. (Kamex/Blastoise)
- Super Smash Bros. Melee (Kamex/Blastoise)
- Tales of Phantasia (Mars, Pegasus, Harrison)
- Tales of the World: Narikiri Dungeon 2 (Mighty Kongman)
- Tales of the World: Narikiri Dungeon 3 (Mighty Kongman)
- Tales of the World: Radiant Mythology 2 (Mighty Kongman)
- Tales of VS. (Mighty Kongman)
- Tengai Makyō III: Namida (Taojirius)
- Tom Clancy's Splinter Cell (Sam Fisher) (Japanese dub)
- Tom Clancy's Splinter Cell: Blacklist (Sam Fisher) (Japanese dub)
- Tom Clancy's Splinter Cell: Chaos Theory (Sam Fisher) (Japanese dub)
- Tom Clancy's Splinter Cell: Conviction (Sam Fisher) (Japanese dub)
- Tom Clancy's Splinter Cell: Pandora Tomorrow (Sam Fisher) (Japanese dub)
- The Misadventures of Tron Bonne (Teisel Bonne)
- Valis IV (Asfar)
- Ys IV - The Dawn of Ys (Gadis)

=== Dubbing roles ===
==== Voice-double ====
- Arnold Schwarzenegger
  - Conan the Barbarian (1989 TV Asahi edition) (Conan)
  - Conan the Destroyer (1989 TV Asahi edition) (Conan)
  - The Terminator (1998 DVD and 2003 TV Tokyo editions) (T-800)
  - Commando (1989 TV Asahi and Collector's Box edition) (John Matrix)
  - Raw Deal (1991 TV Asahi edition) (Mark Kaminsky)
  - Predator (1993 TV Asahi edition) (Major Alan "Dutch" Schaefer)
  - The Running Man (1990 TV Asahi, DVD and VOD editions) (Ben Richards)
  - Red Heat (Ivan Danko)
  - Twins (1991 TV Asahi edition) (Julius Benedict)
  - Kindergarten Cop (1995 TV Asahi edition) (John Kimble)
  - Total Recall (1992 TV Asahi edition) (Douglas Quaid/Hauser)
  - Terminator 2: Judgment Day (1993 Fuji TV and "Extreme" editions) (T-800)
  - Dave (1997 TV Asahi edition) (Arnold Schwarzenegger)
  - Last Action Hero (DVD/VHS and TV Asahi editions) (Jack Slater, Arnold Schwarzenegger)
  - Junior (Doctor Alex Hesse)
  - True Lies (1996 Fuji TV edition) (Harry Tasker)
  - Eraser (1999 NTV edition) (John "Eraser" Kruger)
  - Jingle All the Way (2000 Fuji TV edition) (Howard Langston)
  - Batman & Robin (2000 TV Asahi edition) (Mr. Freeze)
  - End of Days (Jericho Cane)
  - The 6th Day (Adam Gibson)
  - Collateral Damage (Gordon Brewer)
  - The Rundown (2008 TV Tokyo edition) (Arnold Schwarzenegger)
  - Terminator 3: Rise of the Machines (T-850)
  - Around the World in 80 Days (Prince Hapi)
  - The Expendables (Trench)
  - The Expendables 2 (Trench)
  - Escape Plan (Emil Rottmayer/Victor Mannheim)
  - The Last Stand (Sheriff Ray Owens)
  - The Expendables 3 (Trench)
  - Sabotage (John "Breacher" Wharton)
  - Maggie (Wade Vogel)
  - Terminator Genisys (The Terminator/T-800 Model 101)
  - Aftermath (Roman Melnyk)
  - Killing Gunther (Gunther)
  - Terminator: Dark Fate (T-800 "Model 101" / Carl)
  - Viy 2: Journey to China (James Hook)
- Sylvester Stallone
  - Kojak (Det. Rick Daly)
  - Death Race 2000 (Joe "Machine Gun" Viterbo)
  - Paradise Alley (1983 TV Asahi edition) (Cosmo Carboni)
  - First Blood (1999 NTV edition) (John Rambo)
  - Rocky III (2001 NTV edition) (Rocky Balboa)
  - Rambo: First Blood Part II (1987 NTV edition) (John Rambo)
  - Over the Top (1989 Fuji TV edition) (Lincoln Hawk)
  - Rambo III (1989 NTV edition) (John Rambo)
  - Lock Up (Frank Leone)
  - Tango & Cash (Ray Tango)
  - Stop! Or My Mom Will Shoot (1996 Fuji TV edition) (Sergeant Joseph Andrew "Joe" Bomowski)
  - Cliffhanger (Gabe Walker)
  - Demolition Man (Sergeant John Spartan)
  - The Specialist (Ray Quick)
  - Assassins (Robert Rath)
  - Judge Dredd (Judge Dredd)
  - Daylight (Kit Latura)
  - An Alan Smithee Film: Burn Hollywood Burn (Sylvester Stallone)
  - Cop Land (Sheriff Freddy Heflin)
  - Antz (Weaver)
  - Get Carter (Jack Carter)
  - Driven (Joe Tanto)
  - Taxi 3 (Sylvester Stallone)
  - Backtrace (Detective Sykes)
  - The Suicide Squad (King Shark)
  - Samaritan (Joe Smith)
- Dan Aykroyd
  - All You Need Is Cash (Brian Thigh)
  - Ghostbusters (1984) (Doctor Raymond Stantz)
  - My Stepmother Is an Alien (Steven Mills)
  - Ghostbusters II (Doctor Raymond Stantz)
  - My Girl (1994 TV Asahi edition) (Harry Sultenfuss)
  - Sneakers (1998 NTV edition) (Darryl "Mother" Roskow)
  - Chaplin (Mack Sennett)
  - My Girl 2 (TV Asahi edition) (Harry Sultenfuss)
  - Celtic Pride (Jimmy Flaherty)
  - Getting Away with Murder (Jack Lambert)
  - Sgt. Bilko (Col. John T. Hall)
  - Grosse Pointe Blank (Grocer)
  - Blues Brothers 2000 (Elwood Blues)
  - Loser (Dad)
  - Evolution (Governor Lewis)
  - Get on Up (Ben Bart)
  - Pixels (1982 Championship M.C.)
  - Ghostbusters (2016) (Cabbie)
  - Ghostbusters: Afterlife (Raymond Stantz)
  - Ghostbusters: Frozen Empire (Raymond Stantz)
- Laurence Fishburne
  - Othello (Othello)
  - Hoodlum (Bumpy Johnson)
  - The Matrix (Morpheus)
  - The Matrix Reloaded (Morpheus)
  - The Matrix Revolutions (Morpheus)
  - Assault on Precinct 13 (2008 TV Asahi edition) (Marion Bishop)
  - Mission: Impossible III (2010 Fuji TV edition) (Theodore Brassel)
  - Predators (Noland)
  - Contagion (Dr. Ellis Cheever)
  - Hannibal (Jack Crawford)
  - The Signal (Dr. Wallace Damon)
  - Passengers (Chief Gus Mancuso)
  - John Wick: Chapter 2 (The Bowery King)
  - The Mule (2024 BS TV Tokyo edition) (Warren Lewis)
  - John Wick: Chapter 3 – Parabellum (The Bowery King)
  - The Ice Road (Jim Goldenrod)
  - All the Old Knives (Vick Wallinger)
  - John Wick: Chapter 4 (The Bowery King)
  - Transformers One (Alpha Trion)
  - The Amateur (Henderson)
- Samuel L. Jackson
  - Star Wars: Episode I – The Phantom Menace (Mace Windu)
  - Star Wars: Episode II – Attack of the Clones (Mace Windu)
  - XXX (Augustus Gibbons)
  - S.W.A.T. (2006 NTV edition) (Sergeant Second Grade Dan "Hondo" Harrelson)
  - Star Wars: Episode III – Revenge of the Sith (Mace Windu)
  - XXX: State of the Union (Augustus Gibbons)
  - Freedomland (Detective Lorenzo Council)
  - 1408 (Gerald Olin)
  - Jumper (Roland Cox)
  - The Spirit (The Octopus)
  - Iron Man 2 (2012 TV Asahi edition) (Nick Fury)
  - Turbo (Whiplash)
  - RoboCop (Patrick "Pat" Novak)
  - Kingsman: The Secret Service (Richmond Valentine)
  - Miss Peregrine's Home for Peculiar Children (Mr. Barron)
  - XXX: Return of Xander Cage (Augustus Gibbons)
  - Argylle (Alfie)
- John Goodman
  - Sea of Love (2001 TV Tokyo edition) (Detective Sherman Touhey)
  - Always (Al Yackey)
  - Arachnophobia (1996 Fuji TV edition) (Delbert McClintock)
  - Barton Fink (VHS edition) (Charlie Meadows)
  - Born Yesterday (Harry Brock)
  - The Flintstones (Fred Flintstone)
  - The Big Lebowski (Walter Sobchak)
  - Bringing Out the Dead (Larry)
  - Coyote Ugly (Billene Sanford)
  - Evan Almighty (Chuck Long)
  - Confessions of a Shopaholic (Graham Bloomwood)
  - The Princess and the Frog ("Big Daddy" La Bouff)
- Nick Nolte
  - 48 Hrs. (1994 TV Asahi edition) (Jack Cates)
  - Under Fire (Russell Price)
  - Three Fugitives (Lucas)
  - Another 48 Hrs. (1994 Fuji TV and 2001 TV Asahi editions) (Jack Cates)
  - Blue Chips (Coach Pete Bell)
  - Mulholland Falls (Max Hoover)
  - Hulk (David Banner)
  - Paris, je t'aime (Vincent)
  - The Spiderwick Chronicles (Mulgarath)
  - Cats & Dogs: The Revenge of Kitty Galore (Butch)
  - Noah (Samyaza)
- Gérard Depardieu
  - Bogus (Bogus)
  - 102 Dalmatians (Jean Pierre Le Pelt)
  - The Closet (Félix Santini)
  - Vidocq (Vidocq)
  - City of Ghosts (Emile)
  - How Much Do You Love Me? (Charly)
  - Paris, je t'aime (Le Patron)
  - La Vie en rose (Louis Leplée)
  - Diamant 13 (Mat)
  - Potiche (Maurice Babin)
- Steven Seagal
  - Marked for Death (1994 Fuji TV edition) (John Hatcher)
  - Under Siege (Casey Ryback)
  - On Deadly Ground (Forrest Taft)
  - Under Siege 2: Dark Territory (Casey Ryback)
  - Executive Decision (Lieutenant Colonel Austin Travis)
  - The Glimmer Man (Jack Cole)
  - Fire Down Below (Jack Taggart)
  - Exit Wounds (Orin Boyd)
  - Out of Reach (William Lancing)
- Peter Cullen
  - The Transformers: The Movie (Optimus Prime)
  - Transformers The Rebirth (Optimus Prime)
  - Transformers (Optimus Prime)
  - Transformers: Revenge of the Fallen (Optimus Prime)
  - Transformers: Dark of the Moon (Optimus Prime)
  - Transformers: Age of Extinction (Optimus Prime)
  - Transformers: The Last Knight (Optimus Prime)
  - Bumblebee (Optimus Prime)
  - Transformers: Rise of the Beasts (Optimus Prime)
- John Candy
  - The Silent Partner (Simonson)
  - Uncle Buck (Buck Russell)
  - The Rescuers Down Under (Wilbur the Albatross)
  - Home Alone (Gus Polinski)
  - Nothing but Trouble (Dennis Valkenheiser)
  - Only the Lonely (Danny Muldoon)
  - Cool Runnings (1998 NTV edition) (Irving "Irv" Blitzer)
  - Rookie of the Year (Cliff Murdoch)

==== Live-action ====
- 3 Idiots (Viru Sahastrabuddhe (Boman Irani))
- 48 Hrs. (1985 NTV Friday Road Show edition) (Billy Bear (Sonny Landham))
- The Addams Family (Gomez Addams (Raul Julia))
- The Adventures of Elmo in Grouchland (Telly)
- Alien 3 (Golden Yōga Theater edition) (Robert Morse (Danny Webb))
- Alien vs. Predator (Maxwell Stafford (Colin Salmon))
- Aliens (Sergeant Apone (Al Matthews))
- Back to the Future (1989 TV Asahi edition) (Biff Tannen (Thomas F. Wilson))
- Back to the Future Part II (1992 TV Asahi edition) (Biff Tannen, Griff Tannen (Thomas F. Wilson))
- Back to the Future Part III (1993 TV Asahi edition) (Buford "Mad Dog" Tannen, Biff Tannen (Thomas F. Wilson))
- Bad Boys (1999 Fuji TV edition) (Fouchet (Tchéky Karyo))
- Bandits (Darren Smith)
- Beethoven (George Newton (Charles Grodin))
- Beethoven's 2nd (George Newton (Charles Grodin))
- Ben-Hur (1990 NTV edition) (Ben-Hur (Charlton Heston))
- Black Panther (Zuri (Forest Whitaker))
- Blue Steel (1993 Fuji TV edition) (Eugene Hunt (Ron Silver))
- Breakdown (Warren "Red" Barr (J. T. Walsh))
- Bullitt (1977 TV Asahi edition) (Dr. Willard (Georg Stanford Brown))
- The Burning (1985 Fuji TV edition) (Glazer (Larry Joshua))
- Candyman (Candyman (Tony Todd))
- Casualties of War (Private First Class Herbert Hatcher (John C. Reilly))
- Charlie Wilson's War (Gust Avrakotos (Philip Seymour Hoffman))
- Chicago Hope (Doctor Dennis Hancock (Vondie Curtis-Hall))
- Christopher Robin (Tigger)
- Creepshow 2 (Deke (Paul Satterfield))
- Crimson Tide (Chief of the Boat Walters (George Dzundza))
- Cube (Quentin McNeil (Maurice Dean Wint))
- Dante's Peak (Television edition) (Doctor Paul Dreyfus (Charles Hallahan))
- Daredevil (Wilson Fisk / Kingpin (Vincent D'Onofrio))
- Daredevil: Born Again (Wilson Fisk / Kingpin (Vincent D'Onofrio))
- Dawn of the Dead (Sergeant Kenneth Hall (Ving Rhames))
- Death Wish (1980 TV Asahi edition) (Freak #1 (Jeff Goldblum))
- Dick (Richard Nixon (Dan Hedaya))
- Dick Tracy (Dick Tracy (Warren Beatty))
- Die Hard (1990 TV Asahi edition) (Karl Vreski (Alexander Godunov))
- Doctor Who (Opening narration, The Fourth Doctor (Tom Baker))
- El Camino Christmas (Carl Hooker (Vincent D'Onofrio))
- The Enforcer (Bobby Maxwell (DeVeren Bookwalter))
- ER (Dr. Ellis West (Clancy Brown))
- Fatal Attraction (1990 Fuji TV edition) (Jimmy (Stuart Pankin))
- Femme Fatale (2005 TV Asahi edition) (Black Tie (Eriq Ebouaney))
- The Fifth Element (President Lindberg (Tom Lister Jr.))
- Fight Club (Robert "Bob" Paulson (Meat Loaf))
- Flight of the Intruder (LT Jake "Cool Hand" Grafton (Brad Johnson))
- Frankenstein (The Creation (Robert De Niro))
- From Hell (2005 TV Tokyo edition) (Sergeant Peter Godley (Robbie Coltrane))
- Full House (Sandman (Ernie Hudson))
- Furiosa: A Mad Max Saga (The People Eater (John Howard))
- Godzilla: Final Wars (Captain Douglas Gordon (Don Frye))
- Gangs of New York (William "Bill the Butcher" Cutting (Daniel Day-Lewis))
- Get Smart (2011 TV Asahi edition) (Hymie (Patrick Warburton))
- Ghostbusters (1989 TV Asahi edition) (Winston Zeddemore (Ernie Hudson))
- Gone in 60 Seconds (2004 NTV edition) (Detective Roland Castlebeck (Delroy Lindo))
- Gremlins 2: The New Batch (Martin)
- Guess Who (Percy Jones (Bernie Mac))
- Hand of Death (Yun Fei (Tan Tao-liang))
- Hannibal (Barney Matthews (Frankie Faison))
- Hellraiser: Inferno (Pinhead (Doug Bradley))
- High School Musical (Principal Matsui (Joey Miyashima))
- The Hobbit: The Battle of the Five Armies (Dwalin (Graham McTavish))
- Home Alone 2: Lost in New York (1996 TV Asahi edition) (Hector the Consierge (Tim Curry))
- Hot Shots! (LCDR James Block (Kevin Dunn))
- I Now Pronounce You Chuck and Larry (Lawrence Arthur "Larry" Valentine (Kevin James))
- Identity (2007 TV Tokyo edition) (Malcolm Rivers (Pruitt Taylor Vince))
- Indiana Jones and the Last Crusade (1993 Fuji TV edition) (Indiana Jones (Harrison Ford))
- Interview with the Vampire (Armand (Antonio Banderas))
- Johnny Handsome (Doctor Steven Fisher (Forest Whitaker))
- Jurassic World (2017 NTV edition) (Vic Hoskins (Vincent D'Onofrio))
- Labyrinth (Ludo the Yeti (Ron Mueck))
- The Last Boy Scout (1995 Fuji TV edition) (James Alexander "Jimmy" Dix (Damon Wayans))
- The Legend of 1900 (Max Tooney (Pruitt Taylor Vince))
- Life with Mikey (Ed Chapman (Nathan Lane))
- Little Shop of Horrors (Doctor Orin Scrivello (Steve Martin))
- Live and Let Die (1988 TBS edition) (Quarrel Junior (Roy Stewart))
- The Living Daylights (1998 TV Asahi edition) (Brad Whitaker (Joe Don Baker))
- The Machinist (Ivan (John Sharian))
- Major League II (Pedro Cerrano (Dennis Haysbert))
- Martin (2018 Blu-ray edition) (Tateh Cuda (Lincoln Maazel))
- Masters of the Universe (1990 TV Tokyo edition) (He-Man (Dolph Lundgren))
- Maverick (1997 NTV edition) (Angel (Alfred Molina))
- Men in Black (2001 NTV edition) (Edgar the Bug (Vincent D'Onofrio)
- Men in Black (DVD/VHS edition) (Frank the Pug)
- Men in Black II (Frank the Pug)
- Men in Black: International (Frank the Pug)
- The Messenger: The Story of Joan of Arc (2002 NTV edition) (La Hire (Richard Ridings))
- Midnight Run (Jonathan "The Duke" Mardukas (Charles Grodin))
- Mimic (Leonard (Charles S. Dutton))
- Mrs. Doubtfire (1998 Fuji TV edition) (Uncle Frank (Harvey Fierstein))
- The Mummy Returns (2005 TV Asahi edition) (Imhotep (Arnold Vosloo))
- Nick of Time (2003 NTV edition) (Huey (Charles S. Dutton))
- Nicky Larson and Cupid's Perfume (Mammouth (Kamel Guenfoud))
- Night at the Museum (Moai (Brad Garrett))
- Night at the Museum: Battle of the Smithsonian (Moai (Brad Garrett), George Foreman)
- Night at the Museum: Secret of the Tomb (Moai (Brad Garrett))
- Nikita (Bob (Tchéky Karyo))
- Out of Sight (2002 NTV edition) (Richard Ripley (Albert Brooks))
- Pacific Rim (Stacker Pentecost (Idris Elba))
- Patriot Games (Kevin O'Donnell (Patrick Bergin))
- Percy Jackson & the Olympians: The Lightning Thief (Zeus (Sean Bean))
- Pink Cadillac (Alex (Michael Des Barres))
- Police Academy (Cadet Eugene Tackleberry (David Graf))
- Political Animals (Donald "Bud" Hammond (Ciarán Hinds))
- Potiche (Maurice Babin (Gérard Depardieu))
- The Protector (Danny Garoni (Danny Aiello))
- Pulp Fiction (Marcellus Wallace (Ving Rhames))
- Quick Change (Loomis (Randy Quaid))
- Quincy, M.E. (Sam Fujiyama (first voice) (Robert Ito))
- Red Cliff (Liu Bei (You Yong))
- Red Dwarf (Queeg 500 (Charles Augins))
- Regarding Henry (Bradley (Bill Nunn))
- The Reincarnation of Peter Proud (Dr. Frederick Spear (Norman Burton))
- Resident Evil (2004 Fuji TV edition) (One (Colin Salmon))
- Return to the 36th Chamber (Huang Kao-feng (Wang Lung-wei))
- Richie Rich (Laurence Van Dough (John Larroquette))
- Riptide (Cody Allen (Perry King))
- Robin Hood: Prince of Thieves (Little John (Nick Brimble))
- Rumble in the Bronx (1996 Fuji TV edition) (Tony (Marc Akerstream))
- Safe House (2018 BS Japan edition) (David Barlow (Brendan Gleeson))
- Scarface (1989 TV Asahi edition) (Ernie (Arnaldo Santana))
- Screamers (2000 Fuji TV edition) (Lieutenant Commander Chuck Elbarak (Ron White))
- Seinfeld (George Costanza (Jason Alexander))
- Sesame Street (NHK Season 1–35 edition) (Telly Monster)
- Shaolin Soccer ("Golden Leg" Fung (Ng Man-tat))
- Small Soldiers (VHS and TV editions) (Chip Hazard (Tommy Lee Jones))
- Speed (1997 Fuji TV edition) (Lieutenant McMahon (Joe Morton))
- Speed Racer (E.P. Arnold Royalton (Roger Allam))
- Star Trek: Deep Space Nine (Benjamin Sisko (Avery Brooks))
- Star Wars Episode IV: A New Hope (Red Leader (Drewe Henley))
- Street Fighter (General Bison (Raul Julia))
- Supernatural (Uriel (Robert Wisdom))
- Teenage Mutant Ninja Turtles: Out of the Shadows (Krang (Brad Garrett))
- The Three Musketeers (Porthos (Oliver Platt))
- A Time to Kill (Sheriff Ozzie Walls (Charles S. Dutton))
- Timecop (Commander Eugene Matuzak (Bruce McGill))
- To Kill with Intrigue (Chin Chin)
- True Romance (1999 TV Tokyo edition) (Lee Donowitz (Saul Rubinek))
- Two-Minute Warning (1991 TV Tokyo edition) (Sergeant Chris Button (John Cassavetes))
- U Turn (Darrell (Billy Bob Thornton))
- The Ultimate Fighter: Heavyweights (Quinton Jackson)
- Uncommon Valor (1987 NTV edition) (Major Curtis Johnson (Harold Sylvester))
- Vampires (2002 TV Tokyo edition) (Anthony Montoya (Henry Kingi))
- White Fang (Jack Larson (Klaus Maria Brandauer))
- The Wizard of Oz (1987 NHK edition) (Tin Woodman (Jack Haley))
- Woman on Top (Alex Reeves (John de Lancie))
- The World Is Not Enough (2003 TV Asahi edition) (Valentin Zukovsky (Robbie Coltrane))

==== Animation ====
- Balto (Muk and Luk)
- Batman: The Animated Series (Batman/Bruce Wayne)
- Batman: Gotham Knight (Batman/Bruce Wayne) (1,2,4,6)
- Batman: Mask of the Phantasm (Batman/Bruce Wayne)
- The Book of Pooh (Tigger)
- Brother Bear (Tuke)
- Brother Bear 2 (Tuke)
- Buzz Lightyear of Star Command: The Adventure Begins (Emperor Zurg)
- Dinosaur (Bruton)
- Finding Dory (Fluke)
- Hotel Transylvania 3: Summer Vacation (Professor Abraham Van Helsing)
- Hotel Transylvania: Transformania (Professor Abraham Van Helsing)
- Inspector Gadget (1983 TV series) (Inspector Gadget)
- Justice League (Batman/Bruce Wayne)
- Klaus (Klaus)
- The Lego Movie (Good Cop/Bad Cop)
- Rango (Mayor Lynch)
- Shrek Forever After (Mabel)
- Space Jam: A New Legacy (Foghorn Leghorn)
- Spider-Man: Into the Spider-Verse (Wilson Fisk / The Kingpin)
- Star Wars: The Clone Wars (2008 film) (Mace Windu)
- Star Wars: The Clone Wars (2008 TV) (Mace Windu)
- Storks (Hunter)
- Tarzan (Tantor the Elephant)
- Tarzan & Jane (Tantor)
- The Tigger Movie (Tigger)
- Thomas & Friends (Hiro)
- Toonsylvania (Doctor Igor)
- The Transformers (Optimus Prime/Orion Pax, Omega Supreme, Giant, Wolf, Professor Teranova)
- Winnie-the-Pooh (Tigger)
- Zootopia (Leodore Lionheart)

=== Live-action film ===
- The Red Spectacles (1987, Bunmei Muroto)

=== Tokusatsu ===
1980s

- Kamen Rider (Skyrider) (1980, Golden Jaguar (ep. 31 & 32))
- Akai Megane (1987, Muroto Fumiaki (Actor))

1990s

- Talking Head (film) (1992, Narrator)
- Ninja Sentai Kakuranger (1994, Yōkai Senshi Nue (ep. 27 – 29))

2000s

- Tekkōki Mikazuki (2000, Opening Narrator (eps. 3 – 6))
- Mahou Sentai Magiranger (2005, Narrator, MagiPhone Voice)
- Ultraman Mebius & Ultraman Brothers (2006, Yapool/Giant Yapool)
- Ultraman Mebius (2006, Yapool/Giant Yapool (eps. 24 & 42 – 44))

2010s

- Tensou Sentai Goseiger vs Shinkenger: Epic on Ginmaku (2011, Madakodama)
- Kaizoku Sentai Gokaiger (2011, MagiPhone Voice (ep. 3))
- Tokumei Sentai Go-Busters (2012, Gorisaki Banana)
- Tokumei Sentai Go-Busters the Movie: Protect the Tokyo Enetower! (2012, Gorisaki Banana)
- Tokumei Sentai Go-Busters vs. Kaizoku Sentai Gokaiger: The Movie (2013, Gorisaki Banana)
- Tokumei Sentai Go-Busters Returns vs. Dōbutsu Sentai Go-Busters (2013, Gorisaki Banana (Voice), Teacher (Actor))
- Ultraman Ginga S (2014, Giant Yapool (ep. 5))
- Ultra Fight Victory (2015, Giant Yapool, Killer Trance announcements)
- Shuriken Sentai Ninninger (2015, MagiPhone Voice (ep. 38))
- Ultraman Orb: The Origin Saga (2017, Commercial Narrator)

=== Radio ===
- Nijūyoji Kansei Monogatari (Ita-san)

=== CD drama ===
- CD Theater: Dragon Quest I: Daimadō IV: Torneko no Bōken (Torneko)
- Kōei CD Drama Sangokushi (Chōhi Yokutoku)
- The Dark Blue (Roxy)

=== Other ===
- Bandai sentai toy series commercials (narrator)
- Domo-kun World (Domo-kun)
- Star Tours (Mace Windu)
- Hitori de Dekiru mon! (Koron, Jaja Maoh)
- Pooh's Hunny Hunt (Tigger)
- NHK's Konna Ko Iru ka na? (narrator during the Okaasan to Issho segment)
- NHK Education's Tensai Bit-kun (narrator)
- Buzz Lightyear's Astro Blasters (Zurg)
- Tanken Roman Sekai Isan (Dr. Roman)
- You Gotta Quintet (Flat)
- T2 3-D: Battle Across Time (Terminator)
