= Daisuke Yokoyama =

Japanese singer and actor (born 1983)

Daisuke Yokoyama 横山 だいすけ
- Also known as: Daisuke-onīsan (だいすけおにいさん)
- Born: 29 May 1983 (age 43); Oyumino, Chiba, Chiba (now Oyumino, Midori-ku, Chiba), Japan
- Genres: Junior television programmes
- Occupations: Singer; actor
- Years active: 2006–
- Label: Pony Canyon
- Website: yokoyamadaisuke.com

Daisuke Yokoyama (横山 だいすけ, 横山 大介, Yokoyama Daisuke; born 29 May 1983, in Oyumino, Chiba, Chiba (now Oyumino, Midori-ku, Chiba)) is a Japanese singer and actor. He is the 11th generation Uta no onīsan of NHK's programme Okaasan to Issho. He graduated from Kunitachi College of Music.

== Discography ==
=== Singles ===
Year	Title
2009	"Donsuka Panpan Ōendan"
2015	"Yukidaruma no Rū"
2017	"Sayonara dayo Mister"
2018	"Egao o Atsumete"
2019	"Hallelujah lujah / Aishitai Hito"

=== Albums ===
Year	Title
2008	Okaasan to Issho: Saishin Best: Manmaru Smile
2009	Okaasan to Issho: Special 50 Selection
2009	Okaasan to Issho: Saishin Best: Bokura no Uta
2010	Okaasan to Issho: Saishin Best: Koronpa
2011	Okaasan to Issho: Saishin Best: Sore ga Tomodachi
2012	Okaasan to Issho: Saishin Best: Pan Papa Pan

=== DVD ===
Year	Title
2008	NHK Okaasan to Issho: Family Concert: Tomodachi Hajimete Hajimemashite!
2009	NHK Okaasan to Issho: Family Concert: Omatsuri Concert o Surikaero!
2009	Okaasan to Issho: Saishin Song Book: Atchi kotchi March
2009	NHK Okaasan to Issho: Family Concert: Monoran Monoran Konnichiwa!
2010	NHK Okaasan to Issho: Family Concert: Hoshizora no Merry-go-round –50 Shūnen Kinen Concert–
2010	Okaasan to Issho: Saishin Song Book: Arigatō no Hana
2010	NHK Okaasan to Issho: Special Stage: Aozora Wonderland
2010	NHK Okaasan to Issho: Family Concert: Monoran Monoran to Kumo no Ki
2011	NHK Okaasan to Issho: Family Concert: Mori no Ongaku Restaurant
2011	Okaasan to Issho: Saishin Song Book: Dokonokono Kinoko
2011	NHK Okaasan to Issho: Special Stage: Oideyo! Yume no Yūenchi
2011	NHK Okaasan to Issho: Family Concert: Poteijima e yōkoso!!
2011	Okaasan to Issho: Winter Special: Minna de Party!
2012	NHK Okaasan to Issho: Special Stage: Minna issho ni! Fan Fan Smile

== Stage ==
Year	Title	Role
2006	John Manjirō no Yume	
2006	Mahō o Suteta Majorin	
2007	The Lion King	
2017	Kiki's Delivery Service	Okino

== TV Program ==
Year	Title	Role
2008-2017	Okaasan to Issho	11th Uta no Onīsan
2017-	Bitworld	Daisuke Lion
2017	Keishichō Ikimonogakari	Takurō Shijima
2018-	Suiensā	MC
2018-	News every.	Monthly Caster
2019	Keiji Zero	Toshiya Utsumi
2021	Digimon Adventure:	Komondomon

== Dubbing ==
- Coco, Papá
