= Shoko Haida =

Japanese singer, actress, and tarento (born 1979)

Shoko Haida はいだ しょうこ
- Born: March 25, 1979 (age 47); Tachikawa, Tokyo, Japan
- Occupations: Singer, actress, tarento
- Years active: 1998–

Shoko Haida (はいだ しょうこ, Haida Shōko; born 25 March 1979, in Tachikawa, Tokyo, Japan) is a Japanese singer, actress, and tarento. Her stage name was Himeka Chikoto (千琴 ひめか, Chikoto Himeka) when she was in the Takarazuka Revue.

During her career in the Uta Gekidan Zaidanji Haida's nickname was Shoko (ショーコ, Shōko). She grew up in Kunitachi, Tokyo. Haida is represented with Toho Entertainment and later Horipro.

== Filmography ==
=== Stage ===
==== During Takarazuka ====
Year	Title	Role
2000	Hanafubuki: Koi Fubuki	Shirokage, Kagesoro
2001	En College Concert	

==== After Takarazuka ====
Year	Title	Role
2008	Wakakusa Monogatari	Louisa, Jo
2009	Carousel	Carrie
2012	The King and I	Tuptim
2015	Princess Knight	Hell-fujin

=== Concerts ===
Year	Title
2008	Shoko Haida Talk & Little Bit Concert
2008	NHK Kodomo Rōdoku Concert
2008	Muse Organ Candy: Oyako Organ Festival
2008	Shoko Haida Family Concert
2008	Okaasan to Issho Gu: Chocolate Lantern Family Stage
2008	Dream Concert for Kids: Shoko Haida Concert
2008	Sparkling Stage: Yume no Shunkan
2008	2008 Live For Lif "Ongaku Aya": Minako Honda Memorial
2009	feel: Shoko Haida Live

=== Mini concerts and handshake meetings ===
Year	Title
2008	Shoko no My Favorite Songs launch event

=== Events ===
Year	Title
2008	Rhythmical Rhythmo! Stage
2008	Eki-sai Ting 2008 in Hankyū Umeda
2008	Shoko Haida Family Event
2008	Dai 23-kai Zenkoku Dōyō Kashō Concour Grand Prix Taikai

=== In-store concerts ===
Year	Title
2008	Shoko Haida In-store Live
2008	Yuzo Imai Shoko Haida Christmas Special Live

=== TV series ===
==== Regular appearances ====
Year	Title	Network	Notes
2003	Okaasan to Issho	NHK E	
2009	Waratte Iitomo!	Fuji TV	Tuesday regular
2010	Dr. Ocanomizu	TBS	
2010	Utabako	Kids Station	MC

==== Voice acting ====
Year	Title	Role	Network
2009	Chuggington	Vee	Fuji TV
2015	Let's Tensai TV-kun	Okutopa Sumire	

=== Dramas ===
Year	Title	Role	Network	Notes
2010	Sengoku & Bakumatsu Mystery	Oko	TV Tokyo	
2016	Ieuru Onna	Sakura Natsuki	NTV	Episode 3
2016	Sanada Maru	Ohatsu	NHK	Taiga drama

=== Films ===
Year	Title	Role	Notes	Ref.
2022	Tora no Ryūgi 2			

=== Japanese dub ===
Year	Title	Role	Notes	Ref.
2011	The Chronicles of Narnia: The Voyage of the Dawn Treader	Lilian Dill		

=== Advertisements ===
Year	Title	Ref.
2016	The National Art Center "Dalí-ten Tokyo-ten"	

== Books ==
Year	Title
2008	NHK Okaasan to Issho Shin Uta no e Hon Hajimete Hajimemashite
2011	Shoko no Nijiiro Melody

== Magazines ==
Year	Title	Notes
1998	Takarazuka Fan	Issues July 1998 and August 2000
2001	Takarazuka Graph	December 2001 issue
2002	Kageki	Issues August and October 2002
2008	be on Sunday	Interview
2008	CD Data	Interview
2008	Chūnichi Shinbun	Interview
2008	Shopper	
2008	Neko-maru 2009 Fuyugō	

== Discography ==
=== Albums ===
Year	Title	Notes
2002	En College Concert Hoshi-gumi	
2003	NHK Okaasan to Issho Saishin Best: Konoyubi to Mare	
2004	NHK Okaasan to Issho Saishin Best: Kaze no Ohanashi	
2005	NHK Okaasan to Issho Family Concert: Youkozo Utau Mori no Party e	
2005	NHK Okaasan to Issho Yume no Big Parade BV Choco Lantern to Yukaina Nakama-tachi	
2006	NHK Okaasan to Issho Special Gu: Choco Lantern to Yukaina Nakama-tachi Minna de Asobo! Fushigina Fushigina Wonderland	
2006	NHK Okaasan to Issho Saishin Best: Boyoyon Kōshinkyoku	
2007	NHK Okaasan to Issho Family Concert: Oideyo! Bikkuri Party e	
2007	Koro-chan Pack: Pants Pankurō Toilet no Uta	
2007	NHK Okaasan to Issho Special Stage: Choco Lantern to Yukaina Nakama-tachi Fushigina Mori e Youkoso!	
2007	NHK Okaasan to Issho Saishin Best: Kimi no Koe	
2008	NHK Okaasan to Issho Family Concert: Sagazou! 3-tsu no Present	
2008	NHK Okaasan to Issho Song Collection: Yume no Kakera	
2008	NHK Okaasan to Issho Special Stage Gu: Choco Lantern to Yukaina Nakama-tachi Minna Oideyo! Uta no Parade	
2008	Shoko no My Favorite Songs	First solo album
2009	Min'na no Dōyō Shōka Medaka no Gakkō: Yūyakekoyake	
2009	Min'na no Dōyō Shōka Omocha no Chachacha: Furusato	
2010	Min'na de Utau Dōyō Shōka Inu no Omawarisan: Oyasuminasai	
2010	Min'na de Utau Dōyō Shōka Fushigina pocket: Yancharika	
2014	Kuma-mon to Asobo! Ekaki Uta to Asobi Uta	

=== Singles ===
Year	Title	Notes
2009	"Osakana no Uta"	Sang with Takahashi Meijin; Piramekino ending theme, National Federation of Fisheries Co-operative Associations "Osakana" cheer song, Hudson "Mezase Tsuri" theme song
2009	Chuggington theme song	Theme song for Chuggington
2009	Chuggington theme song (Tsūjō-ban)	Theme song for Chuggington
2009	"Tamatomo Forever"	Tamagotchi! ending theme

=== DVD ===
Year	Title
2005	NHK Okaasan to Issho Family Concert: Youkozo Utau Mori no Party e
2008	Okaasan to Issho Special Stage Gu: Choco Lantern to Yukaina Nakama-tachi Minna Oideyo! Uta no Parade

== Others ==
Year	Title
2010	Aki no Kasai Yobō Undō poster
