= You Gotta Quintet =

- Genre: Music; Educational program Variety show Puppetry
- Directed by: Kei Shimoyama
- Starring: Akira Miyagawa; Haruhiko Saitō; Tesshō Genda; Ayumi Shigemori; Ken'ya Ōsumi
- Country of origin: Japan
- Original language: Japanese

Production
- Producer: Kei Shimoyama
- Running time: 12 minutes (2003); 10 minutes (2004-2013)
- Production company: NHK

Original release
- Network: NHK Educational TV
- Release: 7 April 2003 – 30 March 2013

You Gotta Quintet (クインテット) is a Japanese musical children's television program which aired on NHK Educational. It is the 2nd NHK puppet variety show overall, the first one being Hotch Potch Station.

== About the show ==
The program offers witty interpretations of classical music for children featuring puppets and a variety of music and cultural entertainment. This program introduces music into daily life for the pleasure of children, and features a musical group called The Evening Quintet. They play folk songs (alongside a bit of J-Pop and anime songs), and classical music, with a variety of instruments such as piano, violin, and clarinet.

In 2023, from 15 September to 6 October (and 2024, from 29 May to 19 June), NHK rebroadcast 20 selected episodes from 2003 and 2007 as part of their E-Tele Time Machine program.

== Program ==
=== Quintet ===
- 1st part: Theme song displaying different seasons
- 2nd part: Puppet show
- 3rd part: Animation or other material
- 4th part: Concert
- 5th part: Credits

=== Quintet Petit ===
Quintet Petit was broadcast from April 3, 2006 to March 30, 2007 and March 31, 2008 to March 27, 2009. It used the third and fourth parts from the main show.

== Characters ==
Akira (Akira Miyagawa)
The only character that isn't always portrayed as a puppet. His age in the show is unknown. He does not speak, and he expresses his emotions through cartoonish body language. He is mainly seen playing the piano, but he also plays the guitar, triangle, and many other instruments. He has a puppet form, but it does not appear in the show often.
Score (Haruhiko Saitō)
The cellist. He is 67 years old, making him the oldest member in the group. He always strokes his long beard whenever hes thinking or is confused. He is not very humble, as he sometimes gloats about his past or the many careers he had before becoming a cellist. He isn't very good with modern technology and has trouble catching up. His favorite season is Spring. He is friends with Flat.
Flat (Tesshō Genda)
A clarinet player. He is 42 years old. He likes performing and singing lullabies. He is very sensitive and cries very easily. Because of this, he's often teased by Aria and Sharp. He has a dog named Forte and loves them very much. In earlier episodes, he had a lower pitched voice and cracked old fashioned jokes, but in later episodes, his voice is much lower, and makes more puns that he used to in older episodes. In one episode, he becomes a detective, but is unable to solve any cases due to his uncontrollable urge to make puns based on the situation. His favorite season is Autumn. He plays the harmonica.
Aria (Ayumi Shigemori)
The violinist. She is 28 years old and the only female member of the group. She is intelligent, strong-willed and friendly, but she is also ill-tempered and self-centered. She has an amazing soprano voice. She can play the accordion, and the ukulele. She often argues with Flat. It is implied in the show that she is a fan of video games, as she is sometimes seen playing what looks to be a Game Boy during practice hours. Her favorite season is Winter.
Sharp (Ken'ya Ōsumi)
A trumpet and percussion player. He is 22 years old, making him the youngest member of the group. He is a university student. He's very easygoing and gentle with everyone, but he can be naive. He has the ability to communicate with animals. He's a big fan of soccer and comics. His favorite season is Summer. He likes to paint as a hobby.
Chi-bō
He is a baby percussion player. He is 11 months old. He usually appears and makes cameos in the episodes. In some 2003 episodes, he used to utter some babbling words, but starting in 2004, he no longer says anything. He also sells concert tickets and does camera work. He's afraid of snakes.

== Partial list of original songs ==
The original songs are written by Kei Shimoyama and composed by Akira Miyagawa.

- "Midnight Zoo" [真夜中の動物園]
- "It's Good to Cry" [泣いたっていいじゃない]
- "Lie" [うそ]
- "I Hate Practicing [練習だいきらい]
- "My habits [ぼくのクセ]
- "Devil's Advocate" [あまのじゃく]
- "Someday When I Become a Star" [いつか星になったら]
- "I Got Hungry" [おなかがへった]
- "I Am Thinking Now" [ただいま考え中]
- "The Yawning Song" [あくびのうた]
- "The Secret Chocolate" [ひみつのチョコレート]
- "Baby" [赤ちゃん]
- "Tomorrow" [あした]
- "The Cello Player in Front of the Square" [広場のチェロ弾き]
- "Golden-ringed dragonfly" [赤とんぼ]
- "I ate Too Much" [たべすぎたのね]
- "The Happiness Xmas" [しあわせクリスマス]
- "Oh, it Smells Good" [ああいいにおい]
- "Look at the Sky" [空みてごらん]
- "Talking with Flowers" [おはなとおはなし]
- "Apology Scat" [おわびのスキャット]
- "Cleaning Waltz" [おそうじワルツ]
- "My Shadow" [ぼくのカゲ]

=== Theme song ===
The 'You Gotta Quintet' Theme" is used to open and close the show. The lyrics of the theme song changes depending on the seasons; the spring version from March to May, summer from June to August, autumn from September to November, and winter from December to February. The lyrics of the opening theme changed starting in 2007.

=== Singing corner ===
In this featurette the Quintet song team presents original songs, works derived from classical material, and folk songs.

- "If You're Happy and You Know It"
- "Railway Songs Yamanote Line"
- "Zuizui Zukkoro Bashi"
- "Salut d'Amour"
- "Boléro"
- "Humoresque"
- "Wedding march"
- "Träumerei"
- "The Blue Danube"
- "La Prière d'une Vierge"

== Repeat and Rebroadcast ==
=== Repeat ===
- Puppet shows and animations from the fourth to the second part does not mean it is not a new one every time. Get a new one, but sometimes, most times are just trying to shuffle a play for broadcasting up to that point I did a full re-broadcast. This system is called repeat.
- Only posts from the viewer does not repeat this.

=== Rebroadcast ===
Quintet
Two weeks in a row two weeks of reruns the previous week.
Quintet Petit
First week of each month, two weeks after this broadcast, a rerun of the first week of the third week, reruns will be broadcast two weeks to four weeks.

== CDs and DVDs ==
=== CDs ===
- You Gotta Quintet: Songs (2004)
- You Gotta Quintet: Classics (2004)
- You Gotta Quintet: Concert [コンサート] (2005)
- You Gotta Quintet: à la Carte [アラカルテ] (2005)
- You Gotta Quintet: Are Kore [アレ！コレ！] (2006)
- I'm Thinking About It [ただいま考え中] (2007)
- You Gotta Quintet: Midnight Zoo [真夜中の動物園] (2008)
- You Gotta Quintet: Dream Continuation [夢のつづき] (2010)
- You Gotta Quintet Best Selection 66 Songs (2010)
- You Gotta Quintet: What! Sense? [エッ！センス？] (2011)

=== DVDs ===
- Classic [クラシック] (2006)
- Original [オリジナル] (2006)
- Harvest Festival [収穫祭] (2007)
- It Is This What! [なに！これ！] (2007)
- A Concert Almost Empty [ガラガラコンサート] (2008)
- Ten Komori [テンコモリ] (2009)
- The Only Anime [トコトンアニメ] (2009)
- The Whole Years [ネンガラネンジュウ] (2010)
- GOOOOOAL!（ゴール！） (2011)

== Awards ==
On December 1, 2005, the program won an Asia-Pacific Broadcasting Union Award in the children/young people program section with the notation "that was able to stream down splendor, the pleasure that this program used the doll, and the music had" at the 42nd annual general meeting in Hanoi, Vietnam.

== Production ==
- Producer/Director: Kei Shimoyama
- Music: Akira Miyagawa, Zenyō Nagayama, Vega Ensemble, Face Music
- Drawing supervision: Ryuji Fujieda and his design studio
- Character design: Ryuji Fujieda and his design studio
- Animation: Tadahiko Horiguchi
- Puppets produced by: Matsushima Hiroshi
- Puppetmaster: Kigutsunoki
- Supervision: Yasuhiro Kondō
- Production Company - 81 Produce
- Studio - NHK
