= Kouichi Oohori =

Japanese actor (born 1963)

- 大堀 こういち
- Born: April 5, 1963 (age 62); Miyagi Prefecture, Japan
- Occupation: Actor

Kouichi Oohori (大堀 こういち, Ōhori Kōichi; born April 5, 1963, in Miyagi Prefecture, Japan) is a Japanese actor. He participated in Gekidan Kenko (now Nylon 100 °C) from 1985 to 1992.

Since his debut Oohori expanded his career in the stage, television, and cinema. He was part of Unit Hanakusons. Oohori also appear in stage shows with folk singer Shozo.

== Filmography ==
=== Films ===
Year	Title	Role	Notes	Ref.
2009	Elevator Trap	Mansion employee		

=== TV series ===
Year	Title	Role	Notes	Ref.
2016	Sanada Maru	Torii Mototada	Taiga drama	
