= Ken'ya Ōsumi =

Japanese dancer, and singer (born 1965)

Kenya Ōsumi
- Born: October 26, 1965 (age 60); Hamamatsu, Shizuoka Prefecture, Japan
- Occupation: Singer

Kenya Ōsumi (大澄 賢也, Ōsumi Ken'ya; born October 26, 1965 in Hamamatsu, Shizuoka Prefecture, Japan) is a Japanese dancer, and singer. He was married to singer Rumiko Koyanagi between 1989 and 2000.

== Appearances ==
- You Gotta Quintet
- Tetsuko no Heya
- Ultraman
