= Masami Iwaki =

Japanese sports shooter

Personal information
- Nationality: Japanese
- Born: 29 August 1976 (age 48)

Sport
- Sport: Sports shooting

Masami Iwaki (born 29 August 1976) is a Japanese sports shooter. She competed in the women's 10 metre air rifle event at the 1996 Summer Olympics.
