= Okaasan to Issho =

Japanese children's television program

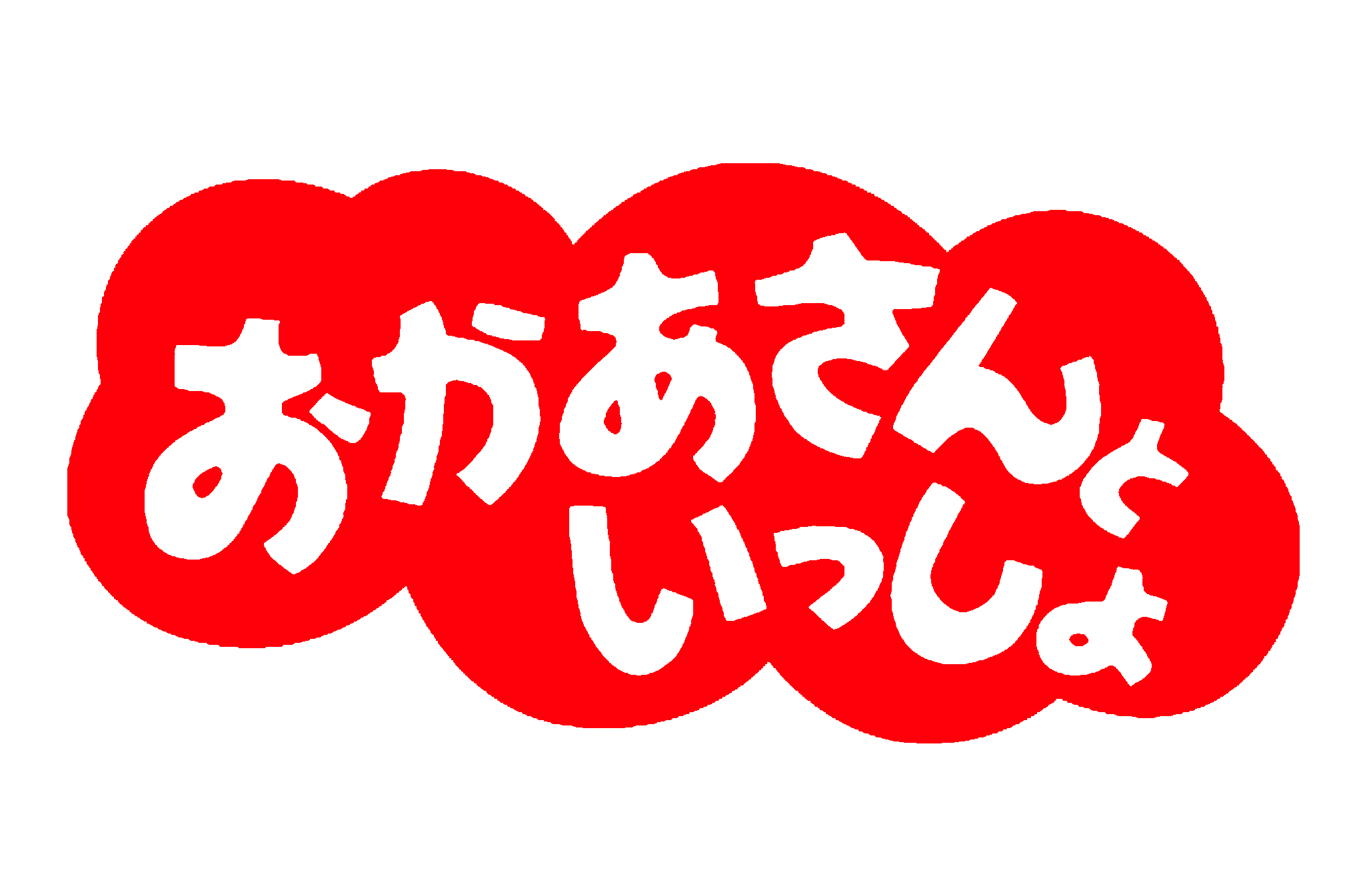
- Okaasan to Issho logo
- Also known as: With Mother (International title - NHK World)
- Starring: Yuichiro Hanada; Maya Nagata; Kazumu Sakumoto; Azuki Akimoto
- Ending theme: "Kinra Kira Pon"
- Country of origin: Japan
- Original language: Japanese

Production
- Running time: 23 minutes
- Production company: NHK

Original release
- Network: NHK Educational TV
- Release: October 5, 1959 – present

Okaasan to Issho (おかあさんといっしょ, With Mother) is a children's television program airing weekday mornings in Japan on NHK. The show consists of seasonal songs, the Fantane! segment, and animated shorts like Tomodachi Hachi Nin (previously also Deko Boko Friends). The long-running program was first broadcast in 1959 and celebrated its 65th anniversary in 2024.

== Cast ==
- Singer Brother Yuichiro Hanada
- Singer Sister Maya Nagata
- Taisou Brother Kazumu Sakumoto
- Taisou Sister Azuki Akimoto
- Fantane!
