= Zenbu Sukutte Yaru =

Japanese manga series

- First tankōbon volume cover

全部救ってやる
- Genre: Drama
- Manga
- Written by: Netarō Tsuneki
- Published by: Shogakukan
- Imprint: Ura Sunday Comics
- Magazine: MangaONE; Ura Sunday
- Original run: April 29, 2024 – present
- Volumes: 8

Zenbu Sukutte Yaru (全部救ってやる; lit. 'I'll save them all') is a Japanese manga series written and illustrated by Netarō Tsuneki. It began serialization on Shogakukan's MangaONE and Ura Sunday websites in April 2024.

== Synopsis ==
Due to the stiff competition she faced in Tokyo, stylist Suzu Hoshino returns to her hometown. One day, she meets a man named Kuga, who is a devoted animal rights activist, taking care of a large number of cats that were bred in poor conditions. She becomes inspired by Kuga's act of kindness and desires to change herself.

== Publication ==
Written and illustrated by Netarō Tsuneki, Zenbu Sukutte Yaru began serialization on Shogakukan's MangaONE and Ura Sunday websites on April 29, 2024. Its chapters have been compiled into eight tankōbon volumes as of July 2026.

No.	Release date	ISBN
1	September 11, 2024	978-4-09-853598-9
2	December 12, 2024	978-4-09-853760-0
3	March 12, 2025	978-4-09-854035-8
4	May 12, 2025	978-4-09-854101-0
5	August 8, 2025	978-4-09-854202-4
6	December 12, 2025	978-4-09-854349-6
7	March 12, 2026	978-4-09-854465-3
8	July 10, 2026	978-4-09-854691-6

== Reception ==
The first volume featured a recommendation from comedian Akira Kawashima.

The series was ranked fifth in the web category of the 11th Next Manga Awards in 2025.
