= Hihi (disambiguation) =

A hihi or stitchbird is a species of bird from the North Island of New Zealand.

Hihi, HiHi, Hi Hi, or Hi-Hi may also refer to:

- Hihi, New Zealand, a community in Northland, New Zealand, named after the bird
- "Hi Hi" (Puffy AmiYumi), a 2004 single by the Japanese pop rock duo Puffy AmiYumi
  - Hi Hi Puffy AmiYumi, a Japanese-American animated television series
  - Hi Hi Puffy AmiYumi (album), a 2004 compilation album
- Hi-Hi, a Japanese comedy duo

== See also ==
- Hi Hi Hi (disambiguation)
