= IPPON Grand Prix =

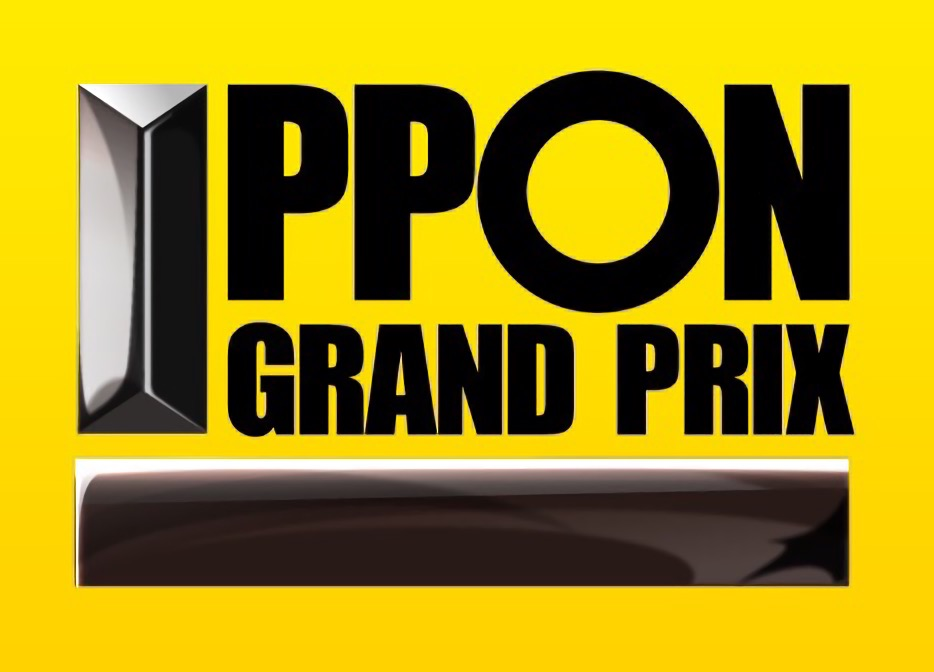
- IPPONグランプリ
- Genre: Owarai; Variety; Television special
- Directed by: Junya Komatsu
- Presented by: Hitoshi Matsumoto; Daijiro Enami
- Starring: Hitoshi Matsumoto and many others
- Narrated by: Kenichi Endō; Shinichirō Matsumoto
- Opening theme: Eikichi Yazawa, "止まらないHa〜Ha"
- Country of origin: Japan
- Original language: Japanese

Production
- Producer: Yuichi Nakajima
- Running time: 130 minutes

Original release
- Network: Fuji TV
- Release: December 28, 2009 – present

IPPON Grand Prix (IPPONグランプリ, Ippon Guran Puri) is a Japanese variety television show focused on owarai and also a bi-annual oogiri competition hosted by Hitoshi Matsumoto, produced and aired on Fuji TV.

== Format and rules ==
The premise of this television special is an oogiri competition between 10 comedians or participants in a two-stage process to crown a winner for that particular contest. The 10 participants are split into Group A and Group B, and proceed to compete within their groups, the winners of each group will face each other in a first to 3 grand finals to determine the winner.

Nine of the ten participants are usually well known veterans and newcomers in the comedy industry, with the remaining final participant coming from a series of auditions to determine a skilled individual that can be amateur or professional at oogiri.

The name IPPON refers to when the participant is successfully able to generate the maximum level of comedic effect as judged by the other contestants. There are four rounds of oogiri questions for each group, and the right to answer the oogiri is a quiz show style, where the contestants must hit the buzzer before anyone else. Every contestant is given equal opportunity to hit the buzzer to answer the question within a time span. When they answer the oogiri, the other group of 5 will judge by allocating their possible 2 points on the answer. If all 5 members of the other group gave their 2 points, then the contestant answering the question would get an IPPON. To achieve an IPPON, they must achieve 10 points, as in full points from all 5 members on the other group. After the 4 rounds, the contestant with the most IPPON points goes on to the finals. Additionally, if a contestant reaches 10 total IPPONs before all 4 rounds finish, he also automatically moves on to the finals.

If by the time all 4 rounds are finished, and there is a tie among the contestants, they go into sudden death mode. An additional question is asked and the individual who gets the IPPON first moves on.

The grand finals are judged by all eight other contestants except for the two grand finalists. Meaning to achieve an IPPON, they need 16 points or full points from the other 8. When an IPPON is achieved, the question is changed immediately and a new question is asked. The first one to achieve 3 IPPONs is crowned the winner.

== Winners ==
| # | Date | Winner | Broadcast Time | Viewership Rating |
|---|---|---|---|---|
| 1st | 2009-12-28 | Bakarhythm | 0:25 - 2:35 | 7.2% |
| 2nd | 2010-03-31 | Osamu Shitara | 0:25 - 2:35 | 5.4% |
| 3rd | 2010-10-06 | Bakarhythm(2) | 0:25 - 2:35 | 4.6% |
| 4th | 2011-01-04 | Hiroaki Ogi | 22:00 - 23:54 | 11.6% |
| 5th | 2011-06-11 | Bakarhythm(3) | 21:00 - 23:10 | 14.6% |
| 6th | 2011-10-22 | Ken Horiuchi | 21:00 - 23:10 | 13.6% |
| 7th | 2012-04-07 | Chihara Junior | 21:00 - 23:10 | 11.9% |
| 8th | 2012-11-17 | Ryuji Akiyama | 21:00 - 23:10 | 13.2% |
| 9th | 2013-05-25 | Ken Horiuchi(2) | 21:00 - 23:10 | 11.4% |
| 10th | 2013-11-23 | Hiroiki Ariyoshi | 21:00 - 23:10 | 15.4% |
| 11th | 2014-05-24 | Ryuji Akiyama(2) | 21:00 - 23:10 | 11.2% |
| 12th | 2014-11-08 | Hiroiki Ariyoshi(2) | 21:00 - 23:10 | 11.0% |
| 13th | 2015-05-23 | Daikichi Hakata | 21:00 - 23:10 | 13.9% |
| 14th | 2015-11-14 | Osamu Shitara(2) | 21:00 - 23:10 | 11.0% |
| 15th | 2016-06-11 | Masayasu Wakabayashi | 21:00 - 23:10 | 11.8% |
| 16th | 2016-11-19 | Akira Kawashima | 21:00 - 23:10 | 12.7% |
| 17th | 2017-05-13 | Chihara Junior(2) | 21:00 - 23:10 | 9.5% |
| 18th | 2017-12-02 | Ken Horiuchi(3) | 21:00 - 23:10 | 11.6% |
| 19th | 2018-03-10 | Bakarhythm(4) | 21:00 - 23:10 | 10.6% |
| 20th | 2018-12-15 | Osamu Shitara(3) | 21:00 - 23:10 | 10.7% |
| 21st | 2019-04-20 | Ken Horiuchi(4) | 21:00 - 23:10 | |
| 22nd | 2019-11-30 | Daigo | 21:00 - 23:10 | 11.1% |
| 23rd | 2020-06-13 | Bakarhythm(5) | 21:00 - 23:10 | 12.7% |
| 24th | 2020-12-05 | Nishida Kouji | | 11.1% |
| 25th | 2021-05-22 | Daigo(2) | | |
| 26th | 2021-12-04 | Akira Kawashima(2) | | |
| 27th | 2022-05-21 | Chihara Junior(3) | | 9.7% |
| 28th | 2023-05-13 | Bakarhythm(6) | | |
| 29th (Note: This edition was hosted by Bakarhythm.) | 2024-02-03 | Ryuji Akiyama(3) | | |

== See also ==
- M-1 Grand Prix
- Hitoshi Matsumoto
- Oogiri
