= Toshiaki Kasuga =

Japanese comedian (born 1979)

- 春日 俊彰
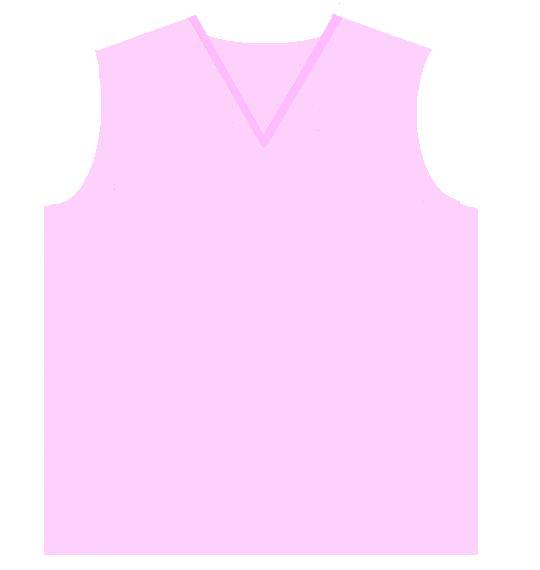
- Kasuga's iconic "pink vest"
- Born: February 9, 1979 (age 47); Tokorozawa, Saitama, Japan
- Education: Nihon University College of Commerce Business Administration
- Occupations: Comedian, TV personality
- Years active: 2000–present
- Employer: K Dash Stage
- Known for: Audrey (owarai)
- Style: Manzai (Boke; Tsukkomi during Nice Middle)
- Height: 1.76 m (5 ft 9 in)
- Children: 1

Notes
- Same year/generation as: Heisei Nobushi Kobushi; Uji Koji; Peace; Non Style

Toshiaki Kasuga (春日 俊彰, Kasuga Toshiaki; born February 9, 1979) is a Japanese comedian best known as the boke half of the comedy duo Audrey alongside Masayasu Wakabayashi. On stage, he usually wears a pink vest and white pants. Aside from comedy, he is also known for his participation in sporting events such as kickboxing, bodybuilding, and finswimming. He was also a YouTuber under the name Hideo Furui.

== Biography ==
Kasuga was born in 1979 in Tokorozawa, Saitama, and graduated from Meiho Elementary School in Tokorozawa. In 1993, he met later-collaborator Wakabayashi as a classmate.

In 1994, Kasuga graduated from Nihon University Dai-ni Junior High School in Tokyo, and graduated from Nihon University Dai-ni High School in Tokyo in 1997. After high school, he entered Nihon University with a major in commerce.

In 2000, Kasuga and Wakabayashi formed their owarai duo "Nice Middle," and Kasuga took a year off from Nihon University before returning in 2001. He graduated from Nihon in 2002.

In 2005, Kasuga and Wakabayashi changed the name of their duo to "Audrey," after Audrey Hepburn.

In 2007, Kasuga was defeated by Wang HongXiang at the K-1 Tryout. In 2008, he won 2nd place at Autobacs M-1 Grand Prix, and in 2009 he won 1st place at Shinshun Owarai Taisho - New wave awards (won 76,009 votes out of total 212,036 from TV audiences).

== Early life ==
Kasuga learned swimming from his early childhood through his junior high school years. He attended a private junior high school in Tokyo, Nihon University Dai-ni Junior High, and met Wakabayashi there when they were 8th graders. Wakabayashi, a trouble-making kid sitting just behind Kasuga, played with him, sneakily cutting his hair from behind without telling him. In spite of Wakabayashi's misbehavior, Kasusga's first impression on Wakabayashi was that he was a "cute boy", and they got along. They also attended the same high school, Nihon University Dai-ni High School and joined the American football Club. Kasuga was chosen as a member of the Kanto's all-star American football Team as a defensive end. However, a penny-pincher, Kasuga did not want to buy outdoor shoes for astro turf that players were suggested to wear for the all-star game, and improperly wearing indoor shoes, was replaced soon after the game had started.

After his high school years, Wakabayashi invited Kasuga to be his manzai partner. However, Kasuga decided to attend Nihon University instead. He spent his university years by taking part-time jobs such as a sales clerk position at Seibu Dome. He mentioned that one day a Glay concert was held there while he was working, and he was very moved after ten years when he was invited to Glay vocalist Teru's birthday party as his favorite aspiring comedian.

Attending mass communication seminars, Kasuga initially planned to be a TV producer while Wakabayashi kept inviting Kasuga to start a comedy career. Finally Kasuga accepted his offer, and they formed a comedy duo, "Nice Middle", in 2000.

== Career ==
=== Dark days to M-1 Grand Prix 2008 ===
Although they happily jumped into a comedy career, they stayed unsuccessful for several years. One day, six years since their debut, a TV play writer called Wakabayashi in person and told him "Kasuga has no talent as a tsukkomi. If you want to play a boke, you'd better look for another partner." Wakabayashi, then the boke of the duo, relayed the comment to the then tsukkomi Kasuga, but he initially thought Wakabashi was just joking around and did not believe him at all. They eventually swapped their roles, went through a trial-and-error process, and finally they made the first appearance on terrestrial TV on New Year's Day of 2008. On December 21, 2008, the two made it all the way into the final round of the M-1 Grand Prix of the year from the consolation match. During the first session in the final, they were temporarily in the top position above the other eight duos, but eventually ended up 2nd behind Non Style.

=== Rise to popularity ===
Unique acts such as shaving his sideburns (a hair style called a "techno-cut"), wearing his hair parted "80/20" (80% of the hair is combed to the right and the rest to the left) with a pink sweater vest, Kasuga, has been broadly accepted by audiences since the M-1 Grand Prix.

In October 2009, Kasuga was chosen with Wakabayashi as a new regular member for "Waratte Iitomo", the nation's most popular afternoon TV show, and a radio personality for "All Night Nippon", one of the longest-running radio programs in Japan.

=== Character on stage ===
Kasuga walks heavily and slowly with his proud 101 cm chest expanding toward the center of the stage. At the opening, he drops a bossy comment to female audiences such as "Would you like to deliver Kasuga's baby?" In manzai, he tries to shoot tsukkomi and each time it turns out to be terribly off-the-line boke. Also, he interrupts Wakabayashi's talks with delayed responses and frequent gags.

In manzai and talk, he responds back saying "Oui" ("Yes"). Holding up his index finger, he yells "Toos!" meaning "Hey!" or "I did it!" Some of his other recurring gags include "Onigawara", "Apa" and the "Kasu" dance.

=== Penny pincher ===
His stingy life style has been introduced in many variety shows. He says that he wants to save as much money as possible to buy a single-family home in the future.

=== Other ventures ===
Kasuga participated in K-1 kickboxing in 2007. He retired after two fighting matches due to ruptured eardrum.

Kasuga has represented Japan at the Finswimming Master World Cup, organized by the Confédération Mondiale des Activités Subaquatiques. He won a bronze medal at the 2015 event in Ravenna, Italy and a silver medal at the 2016 event in Prague, Czech Republic.

Kasuga started bodybuilding in 2013 and placed fifth at the 23rd Tokyo Bodybuilding Tournament in 2015. He did not qualify at the 24th event in 2016.

Kasuga ran a YouTube channel under the name Hideo Furui, which was discontinued in December 2021.

== Personal life ==
He is described as reserved, polite and modest, contrary to his character on TV. Wakabayashi has said he has never heard Kasuga speaking bad about others. Mikio Date, a member of owarai duo Sandwichman has also said Kasuga had neither spoken ill of others nor agreed with other comedians' bad comments on others at their joint live rehearsals.

His father has been very supportive of his career, making original DVDs of Kasuga to distribute to the family's neighbors, and frequently giving him advice by e-mail. Though initially against his comedy career, his mother is also supportive, distributing to neighbors the Playboy magazine when one of the issues carried an article on Kasuga. According to Kasuga, all of his family members are big-boned. His mother used to be a softball player.

Kasuga had a fanatical female fan called "Ochimusha" (stray samurai) when he was a football player in high school. From the age of 20, he had a girlfriend (called "Dogu" (clay doll) by Wakabayashi) for five years. When he dated her, his friends called him "Moai" due to his big head, and named the two "the mysterious couple." She later said on the TV program "London Hearts" that he was gentle, but she separated from him because she did not like his indecisiveness. On the show, unexpectedly meeting her at a bar, he got very nervous and passed her once but looked back at her repeatedly. (He just looked like he was "spinning around.")

On his birthday, February 9, 2009, he was photographed by a paparazzo during the night while he was dating a 30-year-old woman who, according to Wakabayashi, resembles the "Hippo of Isodin." (One of Japanese confectionery/pharmaceutical company Meiji Seika's anime characters. See the "External Links" section below). Kasuga later said that he was going to make her his girlfriend, but after the photo's publication, he was unsuccessful in reaching her.

In April, 2019, Kasuga proposed to his girlfriend of 11 years "Kumi-san" on the television variety Monitoring.

== Media ==
=== TV ===
- Campus Night Fuji (キャンパスナイト･フジ) -- Fuji Television/CX (4/10/2009-)
- School Kakumei (スクール革命!) -- Nippon Television (4/5/2009-)
- Merengue no Kimochi (メレンゲの気持ち) -- Nippon Television (4/25/2009-) *Every three weeks
- Zenbu Uso (ぜんぶウソ) -- Nippon Television (10/3/2009-)
- Morita Kazuyoshi Hour Waratte Iitomo! (森田一義アワー笑っていいとも！) -- Fuji Television (10/9/2009-) *Every Monday
- DERO!
- TORE!
- Wednesday's Downtown
- Kasuga Location (Nippon Television, 2023–present), producer/co-host

=== Radio ===
- Audrey no Shampoo Ojisan (オードリーのシャンプーおじさん) -- Nippon Cultural Broadcasting (4/7/2009-) *Every Tuesday
- All Night Nippon (オールナイトニッポン) -- Nippon Broadcasting System (10/10/2009-) *Every Sunday from 1:00 am

=== Internet TV ===
- Sora o Minakya Komaruyo! (そらを見なきゃ困るよ!)—GyaO Jocky (11/2007-）
- Kokuccha! (告っちゃ!)—GyaO Jocky (5/2007-）
- Ainari (あいなり)—GyaO Jocky (9/2007-10/2007）
- After School, Totsugeki High School (After School TV内「突撃!ハイスクール」)—Nikkei Shingaku Navi (3/2008-）
