= Okamura =

Okamura (岡村; lit. 'hill village') is a Japanese surname. Notable people with the surname include:

- Akemi Okamura (岡村 明美; born 1969), Japanese voice actor
- Akihiko Okamura (岡村 昭彦; 1929–1985), Japanese photographer
- Allison Okamura, American roboticist
- Arthur Okamura, American silk screen artist
- Chonosuke Okamura (岡村 長之助; born 1901), Japanese amateur paleontologist who won the Ig Nobel Prize
- Frank Okamura (1911–2006), Japanese-born American horticulturalist
- Gerald Okamura, Hawaiian martial artist
- Hayato Okamura (born 1966), Czech–Japanese translator and politician
- Henry Okamura (1924–2005), American judoka
- Hiroki Okamura (岡村 洋輝; born 1998), Japanese badminton player
- Hiroshi Okamura (岡村 博; 1905–1948), Japanese mathematician
- Hitoshi Okamura (岡村 均; born 1952), Japanese scientist who specializes in chronobiology
- Homare Okamura (岡村 ほまれ; born 2005), Japanese singer and model
- Ikuko Okamura (岡村 育子; born 1976), Japanese field hockey player
- Kazumi Okamura (岡村 和美; born 1957), Japanese jurist
- Kazuo Okamura (岡村 一夫; 1911–1973), Japanese-American professional wrestler
- Kintarô Okamura (岡村 金太郎; 1867–1935), Japanese botanist
- Kyōka Okamura (岡村 恭香; born 1995), Japanese tennis player
- Michio Okamura, Japanese game developer and artist
- Miwako Okamura (岡村 美和子; born 1963), Japanese actress
- Motoharu Okamura (岡村 基春; 1901–1948), Japanese naval aviator
- Shûtai Okamura (1877–1947), Japanese bryologist
- Sota Okamura (岡村 創太; born 1977), Japanese ski jumper
- Takako Okamura (岡村 孝子; born 1962), Japanese singer-songwriter
- Takashi Okamura (disambiguation), multiple people
- Tensai Okamura (岡村 天斎; born 1961), Japanese anime director and animator
- Teruichi Okamura (岡村 輝一; born 1948), Japanese gymnast
- Tomio Okamura (岡村 富夫; born 1972), Czech-Japanese politician and entrepreneur
- Tomio Okamura (cross-country skier) (岡村 富雄; born 1948), Japanese cross-country skier
- Toshiaki Okamura (岡村 俊昭; 1912–1996), Taiwanese-Japanese baseball player
- Yasuji Okamura (岡村 寧次; 1884–1966), general of the Imperial Japanese Army
- Yasuyuki Okamura (岡村 靖幸; born 1965), Japanese singer-songwriter and music producer
- Yoshiyuki Okamura (岡村 善行; born 1947), Japanese manga artist

== See also ==
- Okamura Island in the Inland Sea, part of the city of Imabari, Japan
