= Masayasu Wakabayashi =

Japanese comedian, television presenter, and actor

- 若林正恭
- Born: 20 September 1978 (age 48); Chūō, Tokyo, Japan
- Other names: Waka-chan (若ちゃん); Waka-san (若さん); Waka-sama (若様); Kipo-san (木保さん); Jari (ジャリ); MC. Waka
- Education: Toyo University Faculty of Letters Literature Department
- Occupations: Comedian; television presenter; actor; author
- Years active: 2000–present
- Known for: Audrey (owarai)
- Style: Manzai (tsukkomi; Boke during Nice Middle)
- Television: Shikujiri-sensei: Ore mitai ni naru na!!; Go hon, Dashi tokimasu ne?; SKE48 no Magical Radio; Nichiyō×Geinin; Tarinai futari
- Children: 1
- Awards: Dynamite Kansai 2010 First Award; 37th Japan Academy Prize Popularity Award; Ippon Grand Prix 15th Award
- Website: Official website

Masayasu Wakabayashi (若林 正恭, Wakabayashi Masayasu; born 20 September 1978, in Chūō, Tokyo) is a Japanese comedian, television presenter, actor, and author. He performs tsukkomi in the comedy duo Audrey. His partner is Toshiaki Kasuga. He is represented with K Dash Stage. He has a sister who is two years older than him.

Wakabayashi and fellow comedian Ryota Yamasato are the main subjects of the 2023 biographical series Passion for Punchlines (だが、情熱はある, Da ga, Jōnetsu ga aru; lit. 'However, The Passion is There') on Nippon TV, in which he was portrayed by Kaito Takahashi of King & Prince.

== Filmography ==
This list only features Wakabayashi himself, for appearances with his partner, see Audrey.

=== Variety ===
Current appearances

Year	Title	Notes	Ref.
2014	Shikujiri-sensei: Ore mitai ni naru na!!	TV Asahi	
2014	Yoroshiku go Kentō kudasai	NTV Special program	
2015	Jinsei no Paisen TV	Fuji TV His partner Kasuga also appeared	
2025	Secret NG House	Prime Video (co-host with Kazunari Ninomiya)	

Former appearances

Year	Title	Notes	Ref.
2008	Tonneruzu no Minasan no Okage deshita	Fuji TV	
2008	Ameagari Ketsushi-tai no Talk Bangumi Ame-talk!	TV Asahi	
2009	Hitoshi Matsumoto no MaruMaru na Hanashi	Fuji TV	
2009	Ippon Grand Prix	Fuji TV	
2011	Himitsu no Arashi-chan!	TBS (Facilitator for "Ristrante Botsu")	
2011	SKE48 no Magical Radio	NTV (Regular appearances as writer Masayasu Wakabayashi)	
2012	Tarinai futari	NTV (Regular appearances as writer Masayasu Wakabayashi)	
2012	Nichiyō×Geinin	TV Asahi	
2012	Chō Ninki Quiz Bangumi Tōitsu No. 1 Kettei-sen! The Quiz-shin	(Progression)	
2012	Sekai wa Kotoba de dekite iru	Fuji TV (Kotoba Star regular)	
2013	Honjitsu, Kaiten shimasu!	TBS	
2013	Bikkuri shi chatta Shin Kiroku	NTV	
2014	Shinobu Sakagami no Seichō Man!!	TV Asahi	
2014	Mirai Rocket	Fuji TV	
2014	Akeru na Kiken	TBS	
2014	Nino-san	NTV	
2015	Suki ka Kirai ka Iu Jikan	TBS	
2016	Go hon, Dashi tokimasu ne?	BS Japan (MC)	
2023	Lighthouse	Netflix (Co-presenter)	

=== Dubbing ===
Title	Role
Misty Island Rescue	Bash

=== Radio ===
Year	Title	Network
	Audrey Wakabayashi wa Free Talker King	
	Audrey Wakabayashi no Free Talker J	
2009	Ninety Nine no All Night Nippon	NBS
2012	Suiyō Junk Ryota Yamasato no Fumōna Giron	TBS Radio
2016	Ryo Asai & Chie Kato no All Night Nippon 0	NBS

=== Solo live performances ===
Year	Title
2010	Audrey Wakabayashi no Dansei-yō Spray Kan no Tadashī Sute-kata
2011	Munasawa King Live #7 Masayasu Wakabayashi Talk Live: Spray Kan no Tadashī Sute-kata 2
2011	Masayasu Wakabayashi Talk Live: Spray Kan no Tadashī Sute-kata 3
2015	Masayasu Wakabayashi no Love or Sick
2015	Love or Sick 2nd stage

=== TV dramas ===
Year	Title	Role	Network	Notes	Ref.
2008	Love 17	Manager Iriya	NBN		
2013	Shūden gohan	Masayasu Harada	TV Tokyo	Lead role	
2015	Yōgi-sha wa 8-ri no Ninki Geinin	Himself	Fuji TV		
2016	Mōmoku no Yoshinori-sensei: Hikari o Ushinatte Kokoro ga Mieta	Michio Miyagi	NTV		

=== Films ===
Year	Title	Role	Ref.
2013	Himawari to Koinu no 7-kakan	Kazuya Sasaki	

=== Stage ===
Year	Title	Role	Ref.
2011	Geinin Kōkan Nikki: Yellow Hearts no Monogatari	Tanaka	

=== Advertisements ===
Year	Title	Co-stars	Notes
2012	Toyota Eco Car Genzei Hojokin	Nahomi Kawasumi	As Genzou Wakabayashi
2014	Mitsubishi Electric Kaden Jigyō	Anne Watanabe and Keiko Toda	

=== DVD, Blu-ray ===
Year	Title
2009	Love 17: L3 Version
2010	Hitoshi Matsumoto no suberanai Hanashi: The Golden 5
2011	Dynamite Kansai 2010 first
2011	Ame-talk DVD 13
2011	Geinin Kōkan Nikki
2012	SKE48 no Magical Radio
2012	Ippon Grand Prix 01, 02
2012	Tarinai futari: Ryota Yamazato to Masayasu Wakabayashi
2013	Fuwafuwa Talk: Konna Kanji de dōdesu ka? Dai Ichi-yo-Dai San-yo
2013	Nichiyō×Geinin Vol. 1-3
2013	Himawari to Koinu no 7-kakan
2014	Shūden gohan: O Haraippai Kanzenhan
2015	Yōgi-sha wa 8-ri no Ninki Geinin
2015	Shikujiri-sensei: Ore mitai ni naru na‼ Dai 1-kan-Dai 3-kan
2017	24 Hour Television Drama Special 2016 Mōmoku no Yoshinori-sensei: Hikari o Ushinatte Kokoro ga Mieta

== Bibliography ==
=== Magazine serializations ===
Year	Title	Notes	Ref.
2010	Da Vinci "Audrey Wakabayashi no Ma Shakai Hito"	Also did illustrations	
2015	Da Vinci "Doite moratte īdesu ka?"		

=== Books ===
Year	Title
2013	Shakaijin Daigaku Hitomishiri Gakubu: Sotsugyōmikomi
2015	Kanzenhan Shakaijin Daigaku Hitomishiri Gakubu: Sotsugyōmikomi

== Discography ==
Title	Notes	Ref.
"Heart: Hato to o Yomesan"		
"Seto no Hanayome"	Rumiko Koyanagi cover	

== Awards ==
Year	Title	Work	Ref.
2014	37th Japan Academy Prize Popularity Award	Himawari to Koinu no 7-kakan	
