= K Dash (talent agency) =

Japanese talent agency

K Dash Co., Ltd.
- Native name: 株式会社ケイダッシュ
- Company type: Kabushiki gaisha (Joint-stock company)
- Traded as: Unlisted
- Industry: Service industry (entertainment)
- Genre: Tarento management
- Founded: December 20, 1993
- Headquarters: Okamoto LK Building, Higashi Nichome 17-10, Shibuya, Tokyo, Japan; ZIP 150-0011
- Area served: Japan
- Key people: Tatsuo Kawamura (Representative chairman); Hideo Matsuda (CEO)
- Website: kdash.jp/kdash/

K Dash Stage Co., Ltd.
- Native name: 株式会社ケイダッシュステージ
- Company type: Kabushiki gaisha (Joint-stock company)
- Traded as: Unlisted
- Industry: Service industry (entertainment)
- Genre: Tarento management, theater production
- Founded: March 7, 1995
- Headquarters: Premier Building 4th Floor, Higashi 2-16-4, Shibuya, Tokyo, Japan; ZIP 150-0011
- Area served: Japan
- Key people: Tatsuo Kawamura (Representative chairman); Hideo Matsuda (CEO)
- Website: www.kdashstage.jp

K Dash Co., Ltd. (株式会社ケイダッシュ) is a Japanese talent agency headquartered in Shibuya, Tokyo. It was founded in 1993 and focuses on talent management for actors, comedians, musical artists and tarento alongside its subsidiary K Dash Stage Co., Ltd. (株式会社ケイダッシュステージ). The main K Dash agency consists of mainly actors and tarento while K Dash Stage emphasizes on managing comedians, variety tarento and theater production. The current CEO, Hideo Matsuda was formerly the manager of veteran comedian Masaaki Sakai.

== Notable talents ==
=== K Dash ===
- Tsuyoshi Ihara
- Katsunori Takahashi
- Hatsunori Hasegawa
- Yoko Minamino
- Ken Watanabe
- Norika Fujiwara (Business alliance)

=== K Dash Stage ===
- Audrey (Masayasu Wakabayashi, Toshiaki Kasuga)
- Tom Brown (Hiroki Nunokawa, Michio)
- Hi-Hi (Kojiro Ueda, Kazunori Iwasaki)
- Hanawa
- Hamakan (Kenji Hamatani, Shinichiro Kanda)
- Akimasa Haraguchi
- Suzanne
- Mika Hagi
- Masafumi Akikawa
- Fudanjuku
