= Hanawa =

Japanese singer and comedian

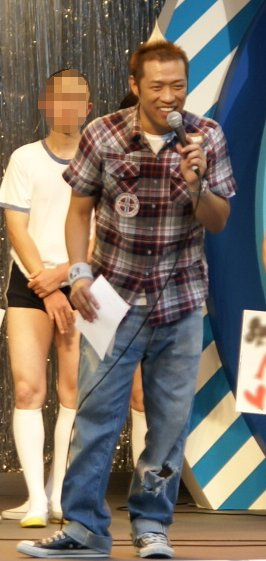
- Hanawa hosting a summer event, August 2008
- Born: 塙 尚輝 (Hanawa Naoki); July 20, 1976 (age 50); Kasukabe. Japan
- Employer: K Dash Stage

Comedy career
- Years active: 1997– present
- Medium: Comedian and singer

Hanawa (はなわ; born 20 July 1976) is a Japanese singer and comedian raised in Saga City. He began his career in 1997 going throughout the 2000s distinguishing himself by use of his bass guitar throughout comedy acts. He rose to fame in Japan during 2003 for a comical song about Saga Prefecture and its oddities. By the end of the year he would appear on NHK's 54th annual Red and White singing contest. Following this exposure, his music would be picked up for commercials and as company songs. He continued to produce more of his own music while also working alongside groups such as Fudanjuku.

== Early life ==
Hanawa was born in Kasukabe, Saitama as the second son of three. Upon turning two years old, he and his family moved to Abiko, Chiba, and later during his sixth year of elementary school to Saga, Saga. During his high school years, he referred to himself as a "band comedian" and incorporated humor into performances as an MC. After graduating from Saga Higashi High School he moved to Tokyo to attend Tokyo Announce Gakuin Performing Arts College.

== TV commercials ==
- Yukiguni Maitake bean sprouts

== Films ==
- Digimon Savers: Ultimate Power! Burst Mode Activated!! (2006), Argomon (voice)
- Fly Me to the Saitama: From Biwa Lake with Love (2023)
