= Hi-Hi =

Japanese comedy duo

- Other names: Iwasaki/Ueda, Double Mosh, Barriquand Stitch, Humming Stitch, Humming (岩崎・上田, ダブルモッシュ, バリカンステッチ, ハミングステッチ, ハミング)
- Employer: K Dash Stage

Comedy career
- Years active: 1993–1995/October 1998– (formed in Tokyo)
- Members: Kazunori Iwasaki (Tsukkomi); Kojiro Ueda (Boke)

Hi-Hi is a Japanese comedy (manzai) duo (kombi) from Saitama prefecture consisting of Kojiro Ueda (上田 浩二郎; born November 9, 1973) as boke and Kazunori Iwasaki (岩崎 一則; born September 17, 1973) as tsukkomi under the entertainment agency, K Dash Stage. Formed in 1998, they are best known for their stand-up acts and TV tarento activities in variety shows. The duo was selected as one of the four finalists among 1,515 professional comedy groups in a televised competition called THE MANZAI 2011, broadcast by Fuji Television on December 17, 2011.

== Biography ==
Ueda and Iwasaki first met while they were students at Kawaguchi Seiryo High School in Saitama prefecture. After graduation, they formed a musical band with two other members. Two years later, following the break-up of the band, Ueda and Iwasaki joined the entertainment company Yoshimoto Kogyo in 1993. In a Yoshimoto event called "Risutora event" (restructuring event), however, the duo was selected as a group that would let go from Yoshimoto due to incompetent performance, after only two years since they joined. Although the company management told them they could come back after a while, Ueda and Iwasaki lost confidence and motivation and left Yoshimoto, and gave up their careers as comedians.

They made a living as truck drivers and gamblers at pachinko slot games. In the meantime, they restarted their activities as a band man. Ueda and Iwasaki played the bass and drums respectively in a band that was initially called "Zari Killer" and performed punk rocks. Later, the band renamed itself "Gum gum 3 channel" and performed a pop music inspired by Mr. Children (a Japanese popular pop band).

After three years of this stint, they passed a comedian audition held at K Dash Stage, Ueda and Iwasaki came back to the career as a comedian in 1998. However, they had not succeeded in raising their profile in the show biz world for 13 years until they earned the finalist position in the manzai competition mentioned above. Soon after this event, Hi-Hi gained more than 100 offers from a variety of media including +50 offers from TV programs.

== Performance ==
Ueda has made all their manzai dialogues. In manzai, Ueda is characterized as a sloppy, fickle and silly one while Iwasaki as a reasonable one. Their performance usually starts with Ueda's hail "Domo-ne! Waratte-ne! Kii-tsukatte-ne! Saikin Doh?" (Hi guys! Please laugh! Please be nice to us! How are you guys!?) followed by his totally meaningless line such as "Do you twirl pasta lately?", "Do you zip lately?", "Do you close curtains lately?", etc. Then, usually Iwasaki warns him "Too friendly (to the audience)! What are you saying..." and moved on to a main dialogue, saying "Listen, I am thinking I would like to...(i.e. travel abroad, buy a pet, ride a motorcycle, etc.)." Ueda does not respond properly, acts as if dropping things that has just popped up in his mind, and keeps shooting silly comments. In the end, Iwasaki closes their dialogue saying "Mo i-ya!" (Enough!).

== Members ==
Kojiro Ueda (上田 浩二郎, Ueda Kojiro)

- Manzai Role: Boke
- Date of Birth: November 9, 1973 (age 52)
- Birthplace: Hatogaya (currently Kawaguchi), Saitama

Kazunori Iwasaki (岩崎 一則, Iwasaki Kazunori)

- Manzai Role: Tsukkomi
- Date of Birth: September 17, 1973 (age 53)
- Birthplace: Ōmiya, Saitama. Grew up in Kashiwa, Chiba

== Media ==
=== TV ===
Past Appearance

- THE MANZAI 2011--Fuji Television
- Guru Guru Ninety-Nine – Nippon Television
- Bakusho Red Carpet – Fuji Television
- Bakusho On-Air Battle – NHK

=== Radio ===
Past Appearance

- Hi-Hi no All Night Nippon R – Nippon Broadcasting System *January 6, 2012
- Audrey no Shampoo Ojisan – Nippon Cultural Broadcasting *January 18/25 2012
- Yompachi 48 hours – Tokyo FM *January 12, 2012
- Hi-Hi no Gyara-kun—Nippon Cultural Broadcasting
- Yoshida Terumi no Yaruki Man Man—Nippon Cultural Broadcasting
