= Aiseki Shokudō =

Japanese TV variety show

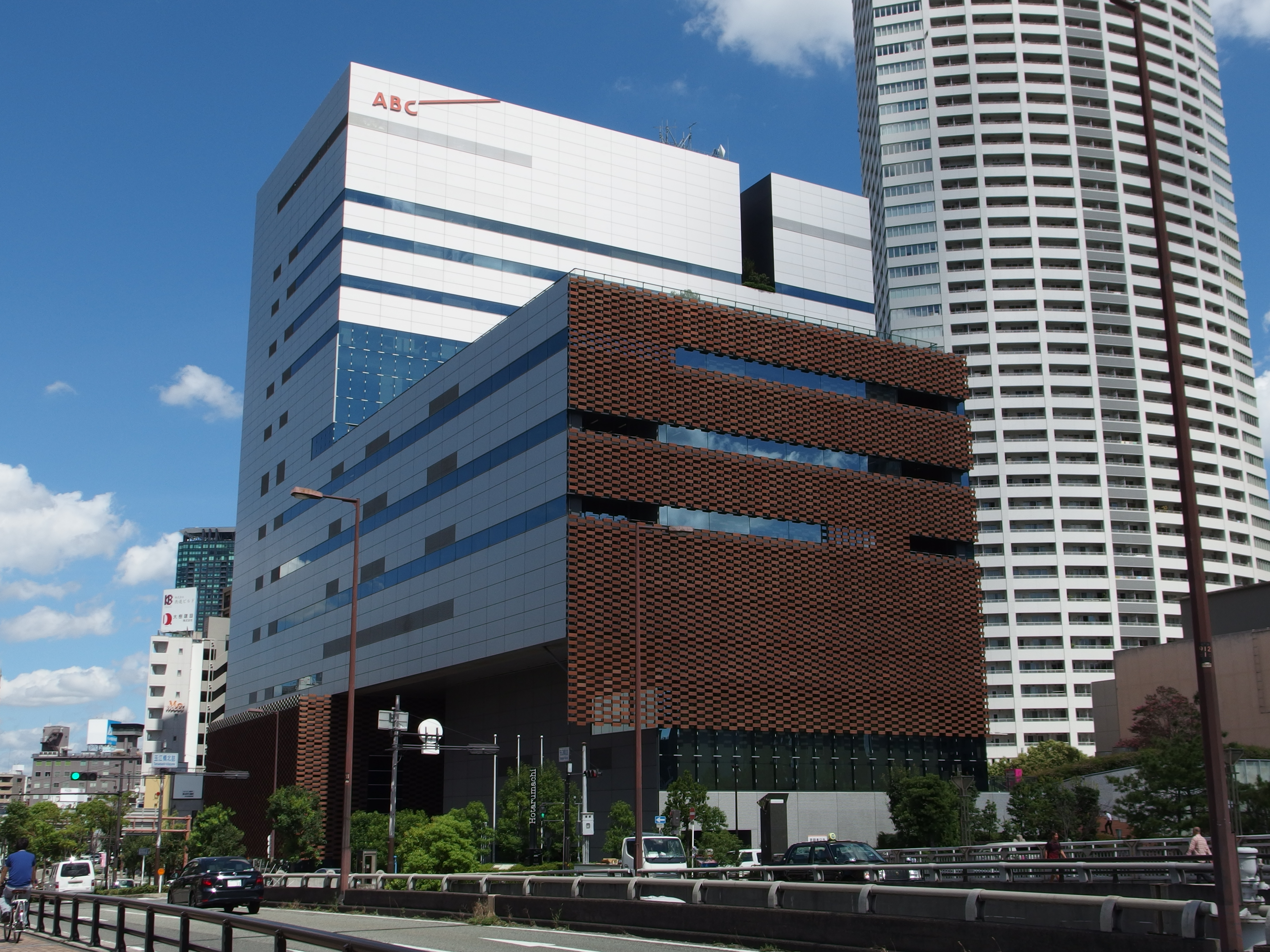
- Asahi Broadcasting Corporation headquarters
- Genre: Japanese variety television shows
- Directed by: Junpei Morita
- Presented by: Masato Den
- Starring: Chidori (Daigo / Nobu)
- Opening theme: Tamio Okuda & Tessie
- Country of origin: Japan
- Original language: Japanese
- No. of seasons: currently 4
- No. of episodes: 168

Production
- Producers: Shinya Takagi; Satoko Maki
- Production location: varies each show
- Running time: 60 min (since April 2019)
- Production company: Yoshimoto Kogyo

Original release
- Network: Asahi Broadcasting
- Release: January 4, 2018

Aiseki Shokudō (相席食堂) is a Japanese variety show that has been broadcast regularly on the Asahi TV network since April 8, 2018. The comic duo Chidori is the host of this show, which is directed by Junpei Morita. The show is produced by Shinya Takagi and Riko Maki, both of whom work for the Yoshimoto Kogyo entertainment conglomerate.

== Background ==
In this program celebrities are filmed in various locations throughout Japan in cafeteria-like settings. The hosts display catchy video images, and when they come across something interesting, they press a pause a video-pause button and add some comic lines. Often celebrities who are unfamiliar with specific travel venues are selected to comment and the resulting gaffes are part of the hilarity. Celebrities who have appeared on this program include Masanari Ueda, Mami Terakawa, Keita Sugiura, and Ryo Sakaue.

On January 4, 2018, a pilot version of this program was aired, featuring information about Inakadate village in Aomori prefecture and the Gotō Islands in Nagasaki prefecture. Based on the positive feedback, regular weekly broadcasts began in April 2018. Many previous broadcasts of this program are now streaming on services such as Amazon Prime Video, Hulu, Netflix, the Osaka Channel, U-Next, and TVer. Most episodes introduce two Japanese locales per show, highlighting the culinary and touristic features of those locations. As of October 15, 2021, a total of 168 episodes of this show have been aired.

== Reception ==
In 2018 Chidori was selected to host this show and by October 2018 the program achieved a target audience viewership of 7% of those watching television in Japan. Moreover, in April 2019 the broadcast time was extended to 60 minutes. However, by 2021 it has been reported that its viewership dropped to somewhere between 3.2% and 5.8%.

== Home videos ==
Two DVDs featuring their program highlights have been marketed so far and this show continues to be aired on over twenty TV stations throughout Japan.
