= Yonino Channel =

Japanese YouTube channel

YouTube information
- Channel: よにのちゃんねる
- Years active: 2021–present
- Genre: Entertainment
- Subscribers: 5.01 million
- Views: 2.02 billion
- Last updated: August 1, 2026

Yonino Channel (Japanese: よにのちゃんねる) is a unit of Starto Entertainment artists, headed by Arashi's Kazunari Ninomiya, in the form of a YouTube channel, run together with KAT-TUN's Yuichi Nakamaru, Hey! Say! JUMP's Ryosuke Yamada and Timelesz's Fuma Kikuchi, that started in April 2021.

== Overview ==
=== 2021 – 2022: Yonino Channel's firsts ===
==== Channel's (anonymous) start ====
On April 8, 2021, a new YouTube channel with no identified owner opened, with a video with the title " An Important Notice from an Entertainment Agency", containing images of Earth from a satellite point of view, to images of Tokyo, to a silhouette of who would be later identified as Ninomiya, with a message of the opening of a new official channel and the dropping of the official first video on the 25th. A second video appeared about one week later, revealing a bit more of what was coming, with 3 new silhouettes more this time. Days later, a third video was released, with the logo "Yuichi's Film" opening the drone-like fly-by shots that led to a collage of silhouettes of the 4 people who would appear.

==== Ninomiya's appeal for subscription and the reveal of the first member ====
The day before the official opening, Ninomiya appeared inviting all to follow the new channel. By the 26th, the channel, still unnamed, had reached 2.7 million views and had gathered 1 million subscribers. In this video, Ninomiya hinted at who could be his first companion.

==== Jyanino's other members and breaking records ====
Days later, with videos having revealed the identity of the other three members (first, Nakamaru, second, Kikuchi, and third, Yamada), the channel reached 2 million followers. The four released a video thanking fans and followers alike for helping the channel reach the number. The now-called Jyanino Channel (ジャにのちゃんねる) (name suggested by Kikuchi) had surpassed Arashi's channel's record by four days, making it the fastest channel to reach 2 million in all Japan. The channel continued to rise in its number of subscriptions and views, reaching 2.58 million subscribers by mid-year, and 8.2 million views for the video where Yamada was revealed as the new member. For this, the channel ranked first in BitStar's "First half of 2021 "newly opened" YouTube channel" ranking. By comparison, King & Prince's channel, centered mostly in music videos, ranked second with 6.2 million views and 670 000 subscribers.

==== Getting a place to call their own: Jyanino room ====
After filming in random places, in May 2021 the group finally got permission from the agency to use an unused space. A new project was born: refurbish the space into a filming room. In October 2021, the completed project was included in one of the channel's videos. Yamada, who secretly planned the room's remodel, led the other 3 into the now-called "Jyanino Room", which included items the group had gone searching for and bought. It also included a blank, undecorated wall for which Yamada requested Nakamaru a mural of the four members. Nakamaru agreed to draw it.

==== Reaching 3 million ====
On December 11, 2021, YouTube announced their top 10 ranking lists. Jyanino Channel was ranked fourth for their video in which Yamada was revealed as the last member, and first as "Top creators with increasing number of subscribers in Japan".

On January 4, 2022, the channel would surpass 3 million followers. The group's achievement would be shared live with around 270 000 fans and followers through a live stream. In the same broadcast, the group announced the sale of commemorative t-shirts.

==== One year of existence and the first TV appearance ====
On April 23, 2022, the group, celebrating the first year of the channel, appeared for the first time on TV, on NTV's 1 oku 3000 man nin no Show Channel (1億3000万人のSHOWチャンネル), hosted by Ninomiya's fellow Arashi member Sho Sakurai. Sakurai noticed the awkwardness of the members and replied "It's not your first appearance on terrestrial television!", making them feel a little more relaxed, and the audience laugh at the comment. The program revived the Arashi ni Shiyagare (嵐にしやがれ) corner "Death Match" in a special gyoza version, with Jyanino members competing against Show Channel members. The group announced there that they would be heading the NTV telethon 24 Jikan Terebi (24時間テレビ) as its main personality. Jyanino members commented that it still surprised them that such a thing was possible. As part of the telethon, the Jyanino members also participated in the design of the new charity tees, with Ninomiya suggesting the theme for the design, and Kikuchi naming a new color ("Lavery" = Lovely berry color).

==== The agency's top channel ====
On May 7, 2022, the channel would hit another marker, becoming Johnny's YouTube top channel, surpassing Arashi's, with 3.26 million subscribers.

==== Anan magazine and 24 Jikan TV ====
The group appeared on the cover of the August 2022 issue of Anan Magazine, with a casual pose, wearing the 24 Jikan Terebi t-shirts. In the interview within the magazine, Ninomiya reflected on his choice of members for the channel, the combined personalities, and the role he and the others are taking now as YouTubers in relation to the collaboration with the TV program, and what he thinks about the future of media in bridging the gap with YouTube/TV collaborations.

On August 21, 2022, the group appeared on a Jyanino-centered edition of Nino san, Ninomiya's NTV program, of which Kikuchi is a regular. It marked the first appearance for Nakamaru, who said he watched the program every week.

On August 22, 2022, Jyanino members had their third appearance on television, in NTV's Shabekuri 007. On the program, Ninomiya and Nakamaru faced Shabekuri members on deciding which was the best hometown.

On August 27, 2022, the group finally appeared on 24 Jikan TV, starting the program singing Arashi's Happiness, while interacting with guests, and even doing a fast change of tees from the yellow one to each wearing a different color. The event's venue was the Kokugikan, located in Sumida, Tokyo. Being the first time the event was held with an audience after three years due to the COVID-19 pandemic, Ninomiya, who reached the stage, declared in front of the Kokugikan audience, "Our mission is to continue doing things safely and securely. We want to have fun doing it". And, although the audience could not shout out loud, Kikuchi smiled and said, "Your cheers are reaching us." With the theme of "I want to see you again", the four members talked about the persons they would like to meet again, while the program showcased precious memories of the members and of programs and people of the past. After the event, the members reflected on the opportunity to participate and the memories they took out of the program. Even though they acted as the YouTuber group, at their core was still being Johnny's idols, so they did not deviate too far from that feeling. When asked what he would like to do after this experience, Ninomiya replied laughing, "I want to take a break now."

=== 2023 ===
==== The first commercial ====
On April 13, 2023, Jyanino Channel celebrated their second year with an advertisement campaign. The "Let's share this deliciousness with 1 million people" campaign from Clear Asahi was a surprise for the four members. At the press conference, Yamada stated that being in front of the reporters made it real for him. Since it was the month of new beginnings (school, new job, etc.), Ninomiya said "I hope that those people will have a 'Clear Asahi' with their friends and work colleagues and deepen their exchanges, and that everyone enjoys their new life." When asked what new activity they would like to do, Kikuchi said that he would like for them to have a music activity unique to YouTube. Yamada said he would like to make an opening video for the channel. Ninomiya went big, aiming for a Guinness record, with the largest toast (with Clear Asahi, of course) held with people registered for their joint events. Nakamaru went to the solo side, mentioning that he would like to become a Manga artist, replying to Kikuchi when he questioned his "solo choice", "That's why I failed...". Ninomiya responded: "When (the manga) comes out, let's have a toast with Clear Asahi," The four filmed and photographed different moments behind the scenes both at the commercial taping and at the press conference, which were included in a video in the channel.

==== 4 million and rising ====
On July 23, 2023, Ninomiya updated his Twitter with the news that the channel had reached 4 million subscribers, receiving praise from fans and friends alike.

==== The "end of Johnny's", channel's small hiatus and name change ====
As with all the other things affected by the Johnny Kitagawa sexual abuse scandal, the channel was no exception. On October 4, 2023, Jyanino Channel announced a name change and a small activity suspension period. Uncertain of what would happen with the agency, with the artists' contracts, and with the channel itself, the period would serve to establish a dialogue regarding the future. They expected to return by November 1. Ninomiya asked for possible names for the channel, receiving over 6600 candidates. On October 24, Ninomiya reported, via the agency, he would leave for individual activities, remaining as part of Arashi. On November 1, he and the other Jyanino members appeared in a new video saying that the group would soon resume activities, but there were still things they had to deal with. By the beginning of December, the channel resumed posting videos, but the name would be revealed days later. On December 6, the final five candidate names were revealed, and the fans were invited to vote for their favorite. The results were revealed on the 10th. In fifth place, with 341 votes, was "Ninomaru Ryoma" (ニノ丸涼磨). In fourth place, with 377 votes, "Nino to yukaina nakamatachi" (ニノと愉快な仲間たち). In third place, with 693 votes, "Yonin no channel" (よにんのちゃんねる). In second place, with 1337 votes, "The Nino Channel" (ザにのちゃんねる). And the winner, with 10255 votes, "Yonino Channel" (よにのちゃんねる). With that, a new era of the channel had started.

=== 2024 ===
==== Nakamaru's hiatus ====
On August 7, 2024, Bunshun Online reported about a secret meeting between Nakamaru, who is married, and a young woman in a Tokyo hotel. In response to this, Nakamaru decided to refrain from activities for an undisclosed period of time. It was decided that Yonino Channel would also stop activities as a consequence, hoping to return soon. On August 31, a short video with the other three members was released on the channel. On it, the members confirmed they would resume uploading videos, without Nakamaru, for the time being.

==== First radio appearance ====
On October 17, 2024, Ninomiya surprised Kikuchi and Yamada with the information that they would be hosting a special version of Nippon Broadcasting System's All Night Nippon, "Yonino Channel no All Night Nippon Premium", that would air on the 22nd. This special would be part of the NBS 70th Anniversary Celebration special programming. The program is run under different themes, so it was suggested to them to make use of their form and make it a "chat format". Four days later, the trio published a video of the behind the scenes at the radio station, previous to the taping of the show.

=== 2025 ===
==== Participating in a YouTube event ====
The channel was invited to be part of a series of specials taking place from November 1 to 14, 2025, to celebrate YouTube's growth of use of the service in Connected TV (CTV). The channel's turn on the first edition of the so-called "Ochanoma Special" was scheduled for November 1.

=== 2026 ===
==== Reaching 5 million ====
Yonino Channel reached 5 million subscribers on June 18, 2026. Their achievement was celebrated in October 29's "YouTube FanFest Japan" event.

== Oricon ranking ==
On March 28, 2025, Oricon posted the results of their annual YouTuber ranking, with the top spot taken by Yonino Channel, making it the third consecutive time the YouTuber group takes the first place. Not only are the performers popular, but the content posted is also wide-ranging and free-spirited in terms of the projects, attracting attention to the content and direction. To date, the channel has over 400 videos (500 including shorts), achieving millions of views per video. With this ranking, the group is one step closer to being inducted into the "Oricon Ranking Hall of Fame", for which the condition is winning five consecutive titles.

== What makes Jyanino special ==
What differentiates this channel from other channels by Johnny & Associates (now Starto Entertainment) (since opening the first channel in 2018 for the Juniors), is that it is the first not dedicated to promoting the artists or their music, but a free range channel, closer to what a true YouTuber channel is, and that its content (planning, filming and editing) is done by the members themselves, with little to no help from staff, unlike with the other channels.

Ninomiya said on A-Studio+ (April 8, 2022) that he wanted a place to freely talk with his juniors, talk about future developments, and the possibility to connect with other Johnny's channels. He chose this group because of things they had in common. But there were other three people that he had considered (but never revealed who these three were). At the beginning, there was an obvious sense of distance, as the members did not know much about the others, other than their musical side, but soon the group became so close that even the "taboo actions" (such as not calling a senior with -kun or -san) were thrown out the window.

== Members ==
Info

- Kazunari Ninomiya (Arashi), founder, nicknamed "Accounting", "President" or "First son". He manages the budget side and thinks about the words ("Voice of the heart") included in the subs of the video.
- Yuichi Nakamaru (KAT-TUN), first recruited member, nickname "Editor" or "Second son" (because of being the second oldest, after Ninomiya). Nakamaru has been in charge of editing videos, since the first one, at the request of Ninomiya.
- Ryosuke Yamada (Hey! Say! JUMP), third recruited member, nicknamed "Self-luminous" (because of his seeming to emit light on himself) or "Third son" (because of being the third oldest).
- Fuma Kikuchi (Timelesz), second recruited member, nicknamed "Manji" (used as a slang term for "mischievous or excitable personality", for being the only extrovert in the group) or "Fourth son" (because of being the youngest). Usually, the loudest, most excited and irreverent, (especially with Nakamaru).
