= Hi Hi Hi =

Hi Hi Hi may refer to:

- "Hi, Hi, Hi", song by Paul McCartney and Wings
- "Hi! Hi! Hi!", song by German singer Sandra
- "Hi Hi Hi", by the Japanese band Scandal from Temptation Box 2010
- Hi Hi Hi, Japanese manga by Shohei Harumoto
- "Hi Hi Hi", song from the 1994 video game EarthBound

== See also ==
- "Looking High, High, High", 1960 song by John R. Watson
- Hihi (disambiguation)
