= Akira Kawashima =

Japanese comedian, tarento and actor (born 1979)

- 川島 明
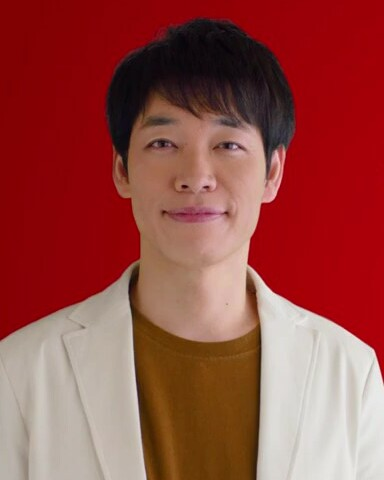
- Born: February 3, 1979 (age 47); Uji, Kyoto, Japan
- Employer: Yoshimoto Kogyo

Comedy career
- Years active: 1997–
- Medium: Television; Theater
- Genre: Manzai (boke)

Akira Kawashima (川島 明, Kawashima Akira; born February 3, 1979, in Uji, Kyoto) is a Japanese comedian, tarento and actor who has featured in films, television, and radio. He performs boke and writes all the material in his comedy duo Kirin. His partner is Hiroshi Tamura. Kawashima is represented by Yoshimoto Kogyo and is mainly active in Tokyo and Osaka.

== Life and career ==
Kawashima graduated from the 20th generation Yoshimoto NSC Osaka. He formed the comedy duo Kirin with Hiroshi Tamura in 1999 and rose to popularity after becoming a finalist in the 1st M-1 Grand Prix in 2001. Kirin continued to make strides as they entered the finals 5 out of the 8 times they entered the M-1 Grand Prix, becoming active in manzai despite their initial focus on the genre of conte. In 2010, Kawashima entered the R-1 Grand Prix and was a finalist, finishing in 4th place overall.

Kawashima was engaged in 2015 and married on March 8, 2016. Later that year in November 2016, Kawashima won his first oogiri winning title on Ippon Grand Prix, defeating the then three-time champion Bakarhythm. From then on, Kawashima was a regular on Ippon Grand Prix, almost winning his second and back to back title against Chihara Junior in May 2017, but lost as the runners-up. Kawashima continues to perform as a television personality.

== Media ==
This list consists of only media appearances and works by Akira Kawashima, for appearances and works as the comedy duo Kirin, see Kirin.

=== Movies ===
- Nichijō Koi no Koe (日常 恋の声) (2007)
- Hashiriya Zero II (走り屋ZERO II) (2009)
- Ningyō Geinin Donto & Notto (人形芸人ドント&ノット) (2009) – Voice-over dub
- Genge (げんげ) (2013) – as Takuya Hirahara
- Kamen Rider × Super Sentai: Ultra Super Hero Taisen (仮面ライダー×スーパー戦隊 超スーパーヒーロー大戦) (2017) – as MC, voice-over dub
- Ito and Her Brothers (2024) – as Isao Narita

=== Television ===
==== Anime ====
- Kinnikuman: Perfect Origin Arc (キン肉マン 完璧超人始祖編) (CBC, TBS, 2024-07-07) – Big The Budō; Neptune King

==== Dramas ====
- Nijūyojikan Atatamemasuka? ~Shippu Udotō Konbini Den~ (24時間あたためますか? 〜疾風怒涛コンビニ伝〜) – Chapter 3, "Koisuru Konbini" (Nippon TV, 2008-03-15) as Imaizumi's boyfriend
- Renzoku Terebi Shōsetsu (連続テレビ小説) (NHK G)

- Tsubaki (つばさ) (2009) – as Bekkamu Ichirō
- Natsuzora: Natsu's Sky (なつぞら, Natsuzora) (2019) – as Katsumi Shimoyama

- A Story to Read When You First Fall in Love (初めて恋をした日に読む話, Hajimete Koi o Shita Hi ni Yomu Hanashi) (TBS, 2019-01-16) – as Yasuda

==== Current Programs ====
===== Regular =====
- Keiba Beat (Kansai TV, 2010-01-10–) – MC
- Little Tokyo Life (リトルトーキョーライフ) (TV Tokyo, 2014-10-08–)
- Majo ni Iwaretai Yoru ~Shōjiki Sugiru Shinasadame~ (魔女に言われたい夜〜正直過ぎる品定め〜) (Fuji TV, 2015-04-13–)
- Keiba Beat Plus (競馬BEATプラス) (Kansai TV, 2016-04-08) – MC
- LOVE it! (ラヴィット!) (TBS, 2021-29-03) – MC

===== Special/Irregular =====
- Futtonda (フットンダ) (Chukyo TV, 2011–) – Annually
- Game King (ゲーム王) (ABC TV, 2012–) – MC, Special Program
- Osaka Game House (大阪ゲーム荘) (MBS TV, 2012–) – Special Program
- Ariyoshi no Kabe (有吉の壁) (Nippon TV, 2015–) – Senpai no Kabe, Special Program
- Ippon Grand Prix (IPPONグランプリ) (Fuji TV, 2016–) – Special Program, Irregular
- Ametalk (アメトーーク) (TV Asahi, 2007–) – Irregular
- Kawashima Ninomiya no Tamigoe (川島二宮のタミゴエ) (Fuji TV, May 25, 2024 - November 9, 2024) (co-host with Kazunari Ninomiya - Irregular
- Anata no gimon sukkiri kaishō! ! Zenryoku shakariki chōsa-dan (2026) (co–hosted with Fuma Kikuchi)

=== Radio ===
- Suppin (すっぴん!) (NHK Radio 1, 2014-04-03–) – Thursday Personality
- Hagaki Shokunin no Utage (ハガキ職人のウタゲ) (NHK Radio 1, 2012–) – MC, Special Program
- Hirameke! Game "Sōzō to Kotoba" (ひらめけ!ゲーム「想像と言葉」) (NHK Radio 1) – Special Program

=== Web series ===
- All Japan XX Gravure Idol Contest Ability (【全日本〇〇グラドルコンテスト】アビリティ) (AbemaTV, 2018-11-04–) – MC

=== Commercials ===
- Uno – Fiber in Color (ウーノ・ファイバーインカラー) (Shiseido, 2006)
- Uno – Face Cleaner Sheet (ウーノ・ふくだけ洗顔シート) (Shiseido, 2006)
- Garlic Pepper Chicken (KFC Japan, 2007)
- Monster Hunter Freedom Unite (Sony Interactive Entertainment, 2008)
- Fire Emblem: New Mystery of the Emblem (Nintendo, 2010) – alongside Riisa Naka
- Pilotwings Resort (Nintendo, 2011)
- Monster Hunter 4 (Nintendo, 2013)
- Suzuki Wagon R (Suzuki)

=== DVD ===
- Kirin Kawashima Solo Live "Rainy Night" (麒麟川島単独ライブ「雨降る夜」) (Yoshimoto Kogyo, 2010-07-21)

=== Bibliography ===
- Utsumuki-kun (うつむきくん) (Futabasha, 2014-11-05)
