= SKE48 no Magical Radio =

- Genre: Variety show
- Starring: Jurina Matsui; Rena Matsui; Akane Takayanagi; Masayasu Wakabayashi; Jiro Sato
- Country of origin: Japan
- Original language: Japanese

Production
- Running time: 30 minutes
- Production company: Nippon Television

Original release
- Network: Nippon Television
- Release: October 11, 2011 – April 7, 2013

SKE48 no Magical Radio (SKE48のマジカル・ラジオ) is a Japanese variety show with members of idol group SKE48 that premiered on Nippon Television on October 11, 2011.

== Cast ==
- Jurina Matsui
- Rena Matsui
- Akane Takayanagi
- Masayasu Wakabayashi
- Jiro Sato
