= KFC in Japan =

Fast food restaurant chain in Japan

Kentucky Fried Chicken Japan, Ltd.

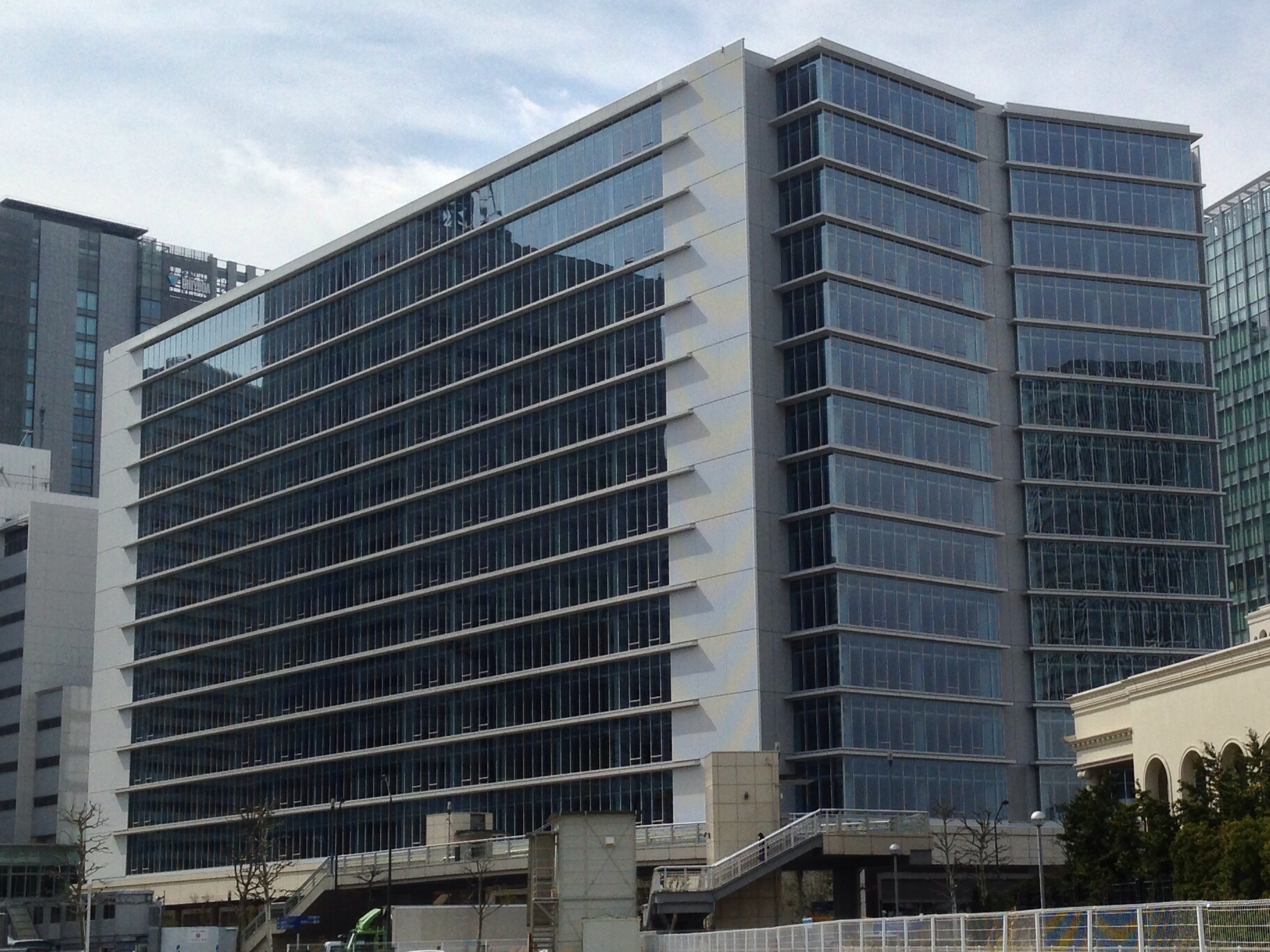
- Headquarters in Nishi-ku, Yokohama
- Native name: 日本ケンタッキー・フライド・チキン株式会社
- Romanized name: Nihon Kentakkī Furaido Chikin kabushiki-gaisha
- Type: Private KK
- Traded as: TYO: 9873
- Industry: Fast food
- Predecessor: Kentucky Fried Chicken Japan, Ltd. (original, 1970–2014)
- Founded: July 4, 1970; 56 years ago
- Headquarters: Nishi-ku, Yokohama, Kanagawa Prefecture, Japan
- Area served: Japan
- Key people: Hisashi Endo (President and CEO)
- Owner: The Carlyle Group (Note: Brand owned by Yum! Brands, used under licence)
- Website: japan.kfc.co.jp

KFC (an initialism for Kentucky Fried Chicken) is a fast food restaurant chain that specializes in fried chicken and is headquartered in Louisville, Kentucky, United States. It is the world's second largest restaurant chain (as measured by sales) after McDonald's, with 18,875 outlets in 118 countries and territories as of December 2013.

Japan is the third-largest market for KFC after China and the United States with 1,165 outlets as of December 2014. In Japan, 70 percent of sales are takeout, with customers tending to buy fried chicken for parties and other special occasions and eating it as a side dish.

== History ==
KFC Japan was originally formed as a joint venture between its American parent KFC and Japan's Mitsubishi Corporation. Following four years of negotiations, Mitsubishi was awarded the franchise rights to KFC in Japan, and a test store was opened at the Osaka World Expo in March 1970.

After its successful debut, the first proper store was opened in the suburban location of Nagoya in November 1970. KFC wanted suburban locations, whereas Mitsubishi argued for city center locations, as cars had not been widely adopted in Japan at that time. Though two more locations were opened in suburban Osaka, the stores struggled, and after less than a year of operation, had lost JP¥ 100 million. As a result of this failure, Mitsubishi's original plan for urban locations was pursued.

The first outlet under the new approach opened in 1972 in Kobe, an upmarket residential area with a large Western expatriate community. The strategy was a success, and by December 1973, 100 outlets had been opened.

Harland Sanders himself visited the Japanese operations in 1972, 1978 and 1980. In 1983 there were 390 outlets with annual sales just under $300 million. By this time Japan was KFC's largest single foreign market.

In August 1990, KFC Japan was listed on the Tokyo Stock Exchange. KFC benefited from the economic boom in Japan during the 1980s, and grew to 1,000 outlets with annual sales of $1.2 billion by 1993. However, the rapid expansion of outlets saw franchisees competing for market shares with each other, and around 100 outlets closed down in the mid-1990s.

In 2000, KFC Japan reported sales of nearly $598 million. In December 2007, Mitsubishi assumed majority control of KFC Japan in a JP¥ 14.83 billion transaction.

=== Christmas ===
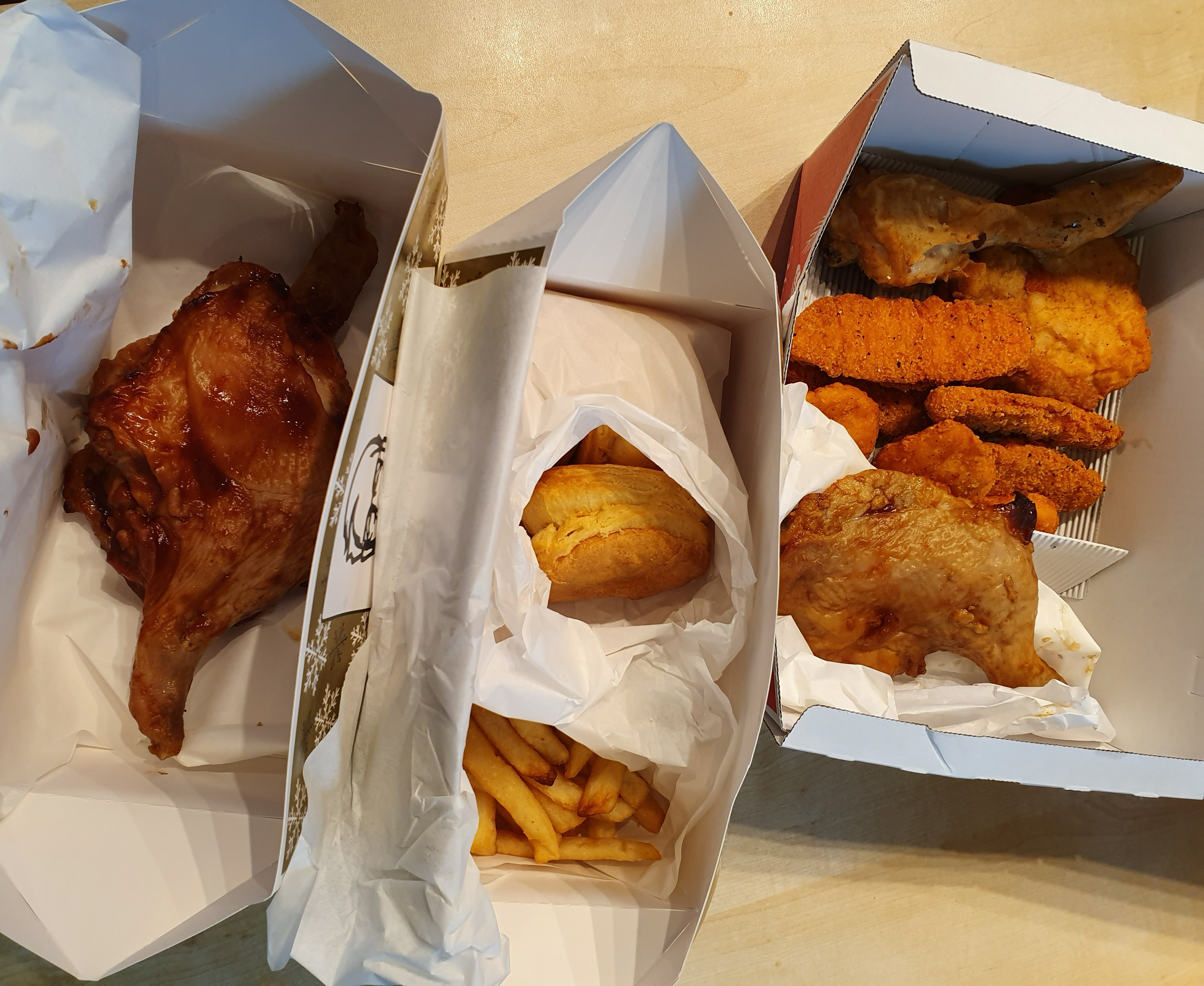
KFC Christmas pack

In 1970, Takeshi Okawara—manager of the first KFC restaurant in Japan—began promoting fried chicken "party barrels" as a Christmas meal intended to serve as a substitute for the traditional American turkey dinner. Okawara marketed the party barrels as a way to celebrate Christmas, a holiday which lacked widespread traditions in Japan at the time.

KFC Japan expanded the promotion nationwide in 1974 with its long running "Kentucky for Christmas" (Japanese: クリスマスはケンタッキー) or "Kentucky Christmas" (Japanese: ケンタッキークリスマス) advertising campaign. Eating KFC food as a Christmas time meal has since become a widely practiced custom in Japan. As of 2019, in Japan, Christmas sales of KFC made around Christmas Eve account for nearly five percent of annual revenue.
