= Audrey (comedy duo) =

Japanese owarai comedy duo

- オードリー
- Agent: K Dash Stage

Comedy career
- Years active: 2000 - Present
- Genre: Manzai
- Members: Masayasu Wakabayashi (Tsukkomi); Toshiaki Kasuga (Boke)

Notes
- Same year/generation as: Peace; Uji Koji; King Kong; Daian; Nagareboshi; Knights; Heisei Nobushi Kobushi; Ryota Yamasato

Audrey (オードリー, Ōdorī), is a Japanese owarai comedy duo of Toshiaki Kasuga (春日 俊彰, Kasuga Toshiaki) as boke and Masayasu Wakabayashi (若林 正恭, Wakabayashi Masayasu) as tsukkomi, formed in 2000. The duo won 2nd place in the M-1 Grand Prix 2008 competition. The duo belongs to the management company K Dash Stage Co., Ltd.

== Biography ==
Formed under the name of Nice Middle (ナイスミドル, Naisu Midoru) in 2000, Kasuga initially was the tsukkomi ("straight man") and Wakabayashi the boke ("funny man"). After almost 6 years of unsuccessful activities, Wakabayashi was one day told by a TV playwright in person that his mate, Kasuga, is "junk" (ポンコツ, ponkotsu) as a tsukkomi, and that he had "better look for another mate". When Wakabayashi tried to explain to Kasuga what he had been told, Kasuga "thought he was just joking." Rejecting the idea but swapping their roles instead, they finally started to make first appearances on terrestrial TV broadcasts in 2008. On December 21, 2008, the two made it all the way to the final round of the M-1 Grand Prix of the year from the consolation. After the first session of the final, competed and broadcast live on the same day, they were temporarily in the top position ahead of the other eight duos, but ended up 2nd overall behind NON STYLE.

The manzai performed by Audrey is characterized by Kasuga's trying to shoot tsukkomi but each time turning out to be terribly off-the-line boke, interrupting Wakabayashi's talks with delayed responses and frequent gags. Wakabayashi, on the other hand, either reacts fast and hard with his tsukkomi in return, or sometimes just "ignores" him.

In 2009, they were on TV commercials for major global companies such as Toyota, Nintendo and KFC.

=== Little Toos ===
On the May 19, 2012 broadcast of All Night Nippon, Wakabayashi decided to call their regular listeners "Little Toos" (リトルトゥース; alternatively romanized as Little Twoos or Little Tous), combining Lady Gaga's fandom name "Little Monsters" and Kasuga's catchphrase, "Toos!" Since then, several Japanese entertainers have proclaimed themselves Little Tooses, such as Hokuto Matsumura, Yugo Kochi, Meru Nukumi, Hikaru Takahashi, and Konoka Matsuda.

=== Event at Tokyo Dome ===
On February 18, 2024, their All Night Nippon radio show event was held at Tokyo Dome. The audience at the venue was 53,000, with another 52,000 people attending the live viewing at movie theaters and 55,000 people watching the live online streaming, for a total of 160,000 viewers.

== Members ==
Toshiaki Kasuga (春日 俊彰, Kasuga Toshiaki)

- Date of Birth: February 9, 1979
- 175 cm 88 kg B101 W83 H98 F28.5 cm
- Birthplace: Tokorozawa, Saitama
- Manzai Role: Boke

Masayasu Wakabayashi (若林 正恭, Wakabayashi Masayasu)

- Date of Birth: September 20, 1978
- 168 cm 60 kg B87 W75 H80 F26.5 cm
- Birthplace: Chūō, Tokyo
- Manzai Role: Tsukkomi
- Writes the material for the unit

== Media ==
=== TV ===
Regular

- Hirunandesu! (ヒルナンデス!) -- Nippon Television (10/5/2011-) *Every Wednesday
- Ikinari! Ougon Densetsu (いきなり! 黄金伝説。) -- TV Asahi (4/15/2010-) *Every Thursday
- Campus Night Fuji (キャンパスナイト･フジ) -- Fuji Television/CX (4/10/2009-)
- School Kakumei (スクール革命!) -- Nippon Television (4/5/2009-)
- Merengue no Kimochi (メレンゲの気持ち) -- Nippon Television (4/25/2009-) *Every three weeks
- Zenbu Uso (ぜんぶウソ) -- Nippon Television (10/3/2009-)
- Morita Kazuyoshi Hour Waratte Iitomo! (森田一義アワー笑っていいとも！) -- Fuji Television (10/9/2009-9/26/2011) *Every Friday
- Audrey-san, Zehi Atte Hoshii Hito ga Irundesu. (オードリーさん、ぜひ会ってほしい人がいるんです。) -- Chūkyō Television Broadcasting (4/8/2012-)
- AKB48 Team 8 no Bunbun! Eito Daihōsō! (AKB_チーム8のブンブン!エイト大放送) -- Nippon Television (1/28/2017-4/1/2017)
- Hiragana Oshi (ひらがな推し) →Hinatazaka de Aimashō（日向坂で会いましょう）-- TV Tokyo (08/4/2018-)

Irregular

- Kaito Shinobi-na (快盗!!シノビーナ) -- TV Asahi (1/17/2009-)
- Quiz Presen Variety Q-sama!! (クイズプレゼンバラエティー Qさま!!}) -- TV Asahi

=== Radio ===
- Audrey no Shampoo Ojisan (オードリーのシャンプーおじさん) -- Nippon Cultural Broadcasting (4/7/2009-) *Every Tuesday
- All Night Nippon (オールナイトニッポン) -- Nippon Broadcasting System (10/10/2009-) *Every Sunday from 1:00 am

=== Internet TV ===
Regular

- Sora o Minakya Komaruyo! (そらを見なきゃ困るよ!)—GyaO Jocky (11/2007−）
- Kokuccha! (告っちゃ!)—GyaO Jocky (5/2007−)
- Ainari (あいなり)—GyaO Jocky (9/2007−10/2007）
- After School, Totsugeki High School (After School TV内「突撃!ハイスクール」)—Nikkei Shingaku Navi (3/2008−）

=== Magazines ===
- Tokyo Isshukan
- TV Pia

=== CM ===
- Nintendo "Nintendo DSi" (2/14/2009-）
- Kaunet (3/2/2009 - ）
- Kentucky Fried Chicken (3/5/2009-)
- Sapporo Brewery "Draft One" (7/2009-)
- DHC "Men's Drug Wax"(9/19/2009-)
- Toyota "Ractis" (10/2009-)
- Benesse Corporation "Shinken Zemi Chugaku koza" (11/2009-)
- Ajinomoto "No Mikata" (11/2009-)

== See also ==
- Owarai
- Manzai
