= Chidori (comedy duo) =

Japanese comedy duo

- Chidori (千鳥)
- Employer: Yoshimoto Kogyo

Comedy career
- Years active: 2000–
- Members: Nobu (Tsukkomi); Daigo (Boke)

Notes
- Same year/generation as: Morisanchu; Robert; Impulse

Chidori (千鳥, Chidori) is a Japanese comedy duo (kombi) consisting of Daigo (大悟) and Nobu (ノブ). They are employed by Yoshimoto Kogyo, a comedian and talent agency based in Tokyo. Both were graduates of the 21st generation from the Yoshimoto NSC Osaka Comedy School. They won the Excellence Awards at the 35rd and 37th NHK Kamigata Manzai Contest in 2005 and 2007.

Daigo and Nobu were high school classmates and friends and formed the comedy duo in July 2000, when both of them were 20 years old. The kombi's style emphasizes on the use of a mixed accent between the Osakan dialect and the Okayama dialect and is known by many as the "Manzai of My Way".

== Members ==
- Daigo (大悟), real name Daigo Yamamoto (山本大悟) Born March 25, 1980 in Kitagishima, Kasaoka, Okayama. Plays the boke. He refers to himself with the pronoun "Washi (わし)", which is uncommon in modern day Japan. He was inspired by the baseball manga Touch by Mitsuru Adachi in high school, which prompted him to join the baseball club at the time. Daigo was good friends with Ken Shimura, a veteran of the comedy industry.
- Nobu (ノブ), real name Nobuyuki Hayakawa (早川信行) Born December 30, 1979 in Ibara, Okayama. Plays the tsukkomi. He once used the name Nobu Koike for a short period because Miwa Asao had mistakenly called him "Koike" in the TV programme London Hearts. Nobu is known for his unique accent and tone when doing tsukkomi.

== Television ==
=== Regular ===
- Iroha ni Chidori (いろはに千鳥) -- TV Saitama (10/1/2014-) MC
- Tensai Terebi-kun (天才てれびくん) -- NHK Educational TV、(2017-)
- Gaito TV Shupotsu! Hinadandan (街頭TV 出没!ひな壇団) -- RCC Broadcasting (10/24/2015 - 3/29/2022) MC
- BAZOOKA!!! -- BS SkyperfecTV (1/9/2017-)
- Nichiyou Chaplin (にちようチャップリン) -- TV Tokyo (4/9/2017-)
- Aiseki Shokudō (相席食堂) -- ABCTV (4/8/2018-) MC
- Manzai Lovers (漫才Lovers) -- Yoimiuri TV (2018-）- MC
- Tenshoku Search, Chidori's Job Lovers (天職サーチ 千鳥のジョブラバーズ) -- ABCTV (10/7/2018-) MC
- Shimura de Night (志村でナイト) -- Fuji TV (10/10/2018 - 4/1/2020)
- TV Chidori (テレビ千鳥) -- TV Asahi (4/2/2019-)
- Loke Geinin Saikyo Keiteisen Gaiou (ロケ芸人最強決定戦 外王) -- Fuji TV (8/15/2018-) MC with Daisuke Miyagawa
- Chidori no Kuse ga Sugoi Neta Grandprix -- CX - MC

=== Irregular ===
- Ima-chan no "Jitsu wa" (今ちゃんの「実は…」) -- ABCTV (4/9/2008)
- Seishun Gakkou 3-nin C-gumi (青春高校3年C組) -- TV Tokyo (4/2018-) Bi-weekly Tuesday MC
- Suporuto (すぽると) -- Fuji TV (03/31/2024-) MC / Panelist
