= All Night Nippon =

Japanese radio program

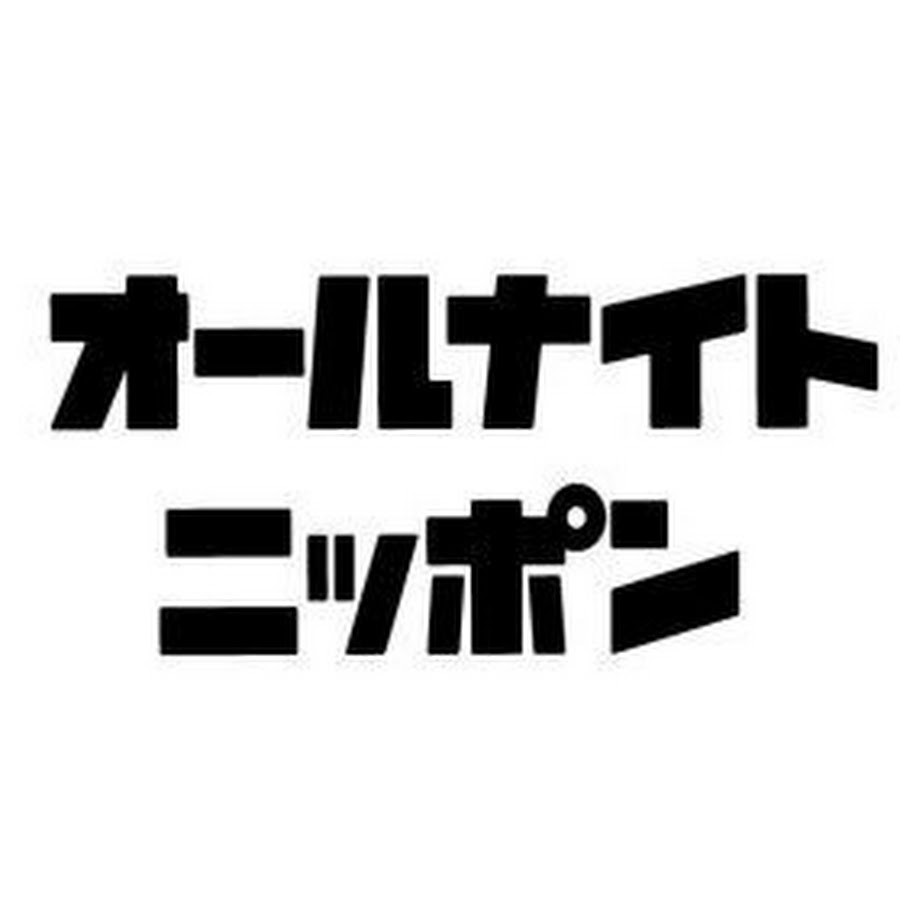
- Genre: Late-night talk show
- Running time: 4 hours
- Country of origin: Japan
- Home station: Nippon Broadcasting System (NRN)
- Starring: see DJs
- Original release: October 1, 1967; 59 years ago
- Opening theme: Bittersweet Samba by Herb Alpert's Tijuana Brass
- Website: Official website

All Night Nippon (オールナイトニッポン, Ōru Naito Nippon; also known as All Night and ANN) is a Japanese radio program, broadcast by Nippon Broadcasting System as the flagship station since 1967 and relayed by various radio stations across Japan. Its spin-off programs include All Night Nippon Music 10, All Night Nippon 0 (Zero), and All Night Nippon X (Cross).

== DJs ==
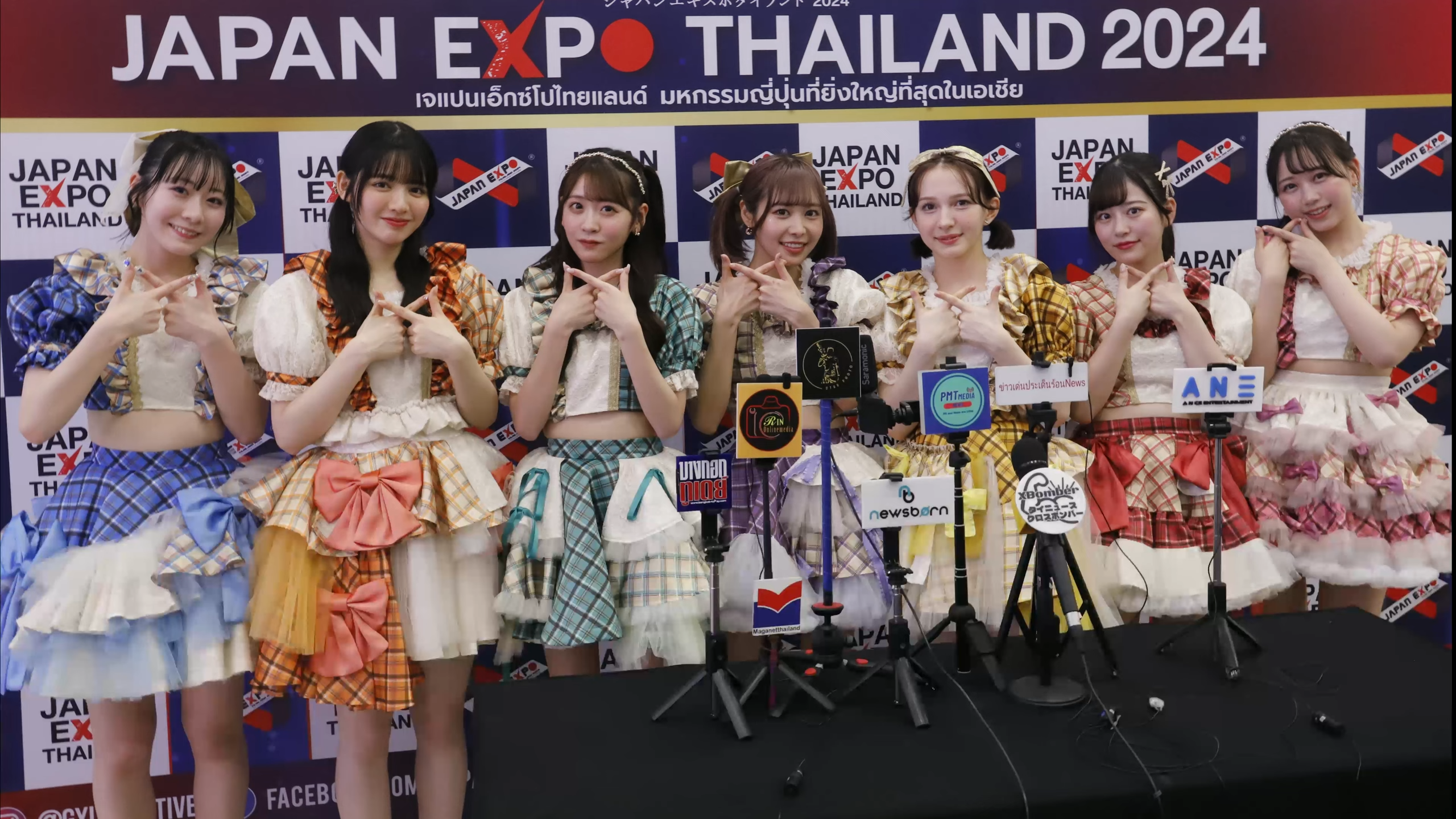
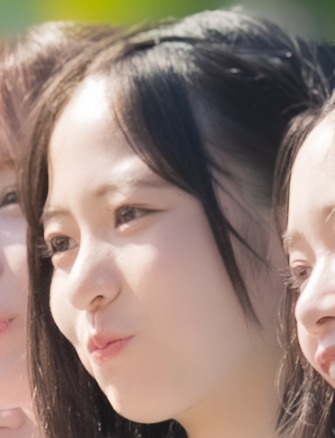
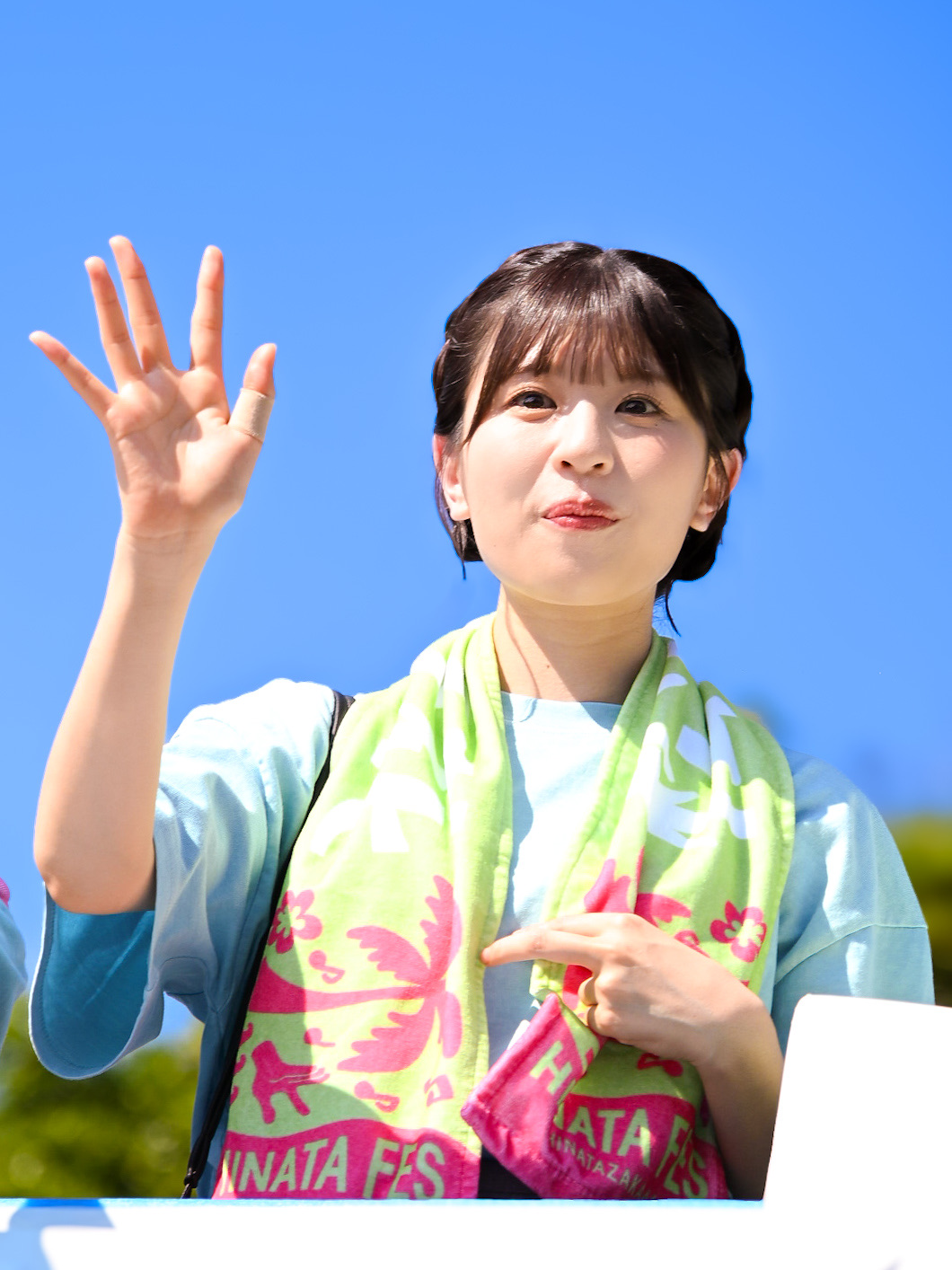
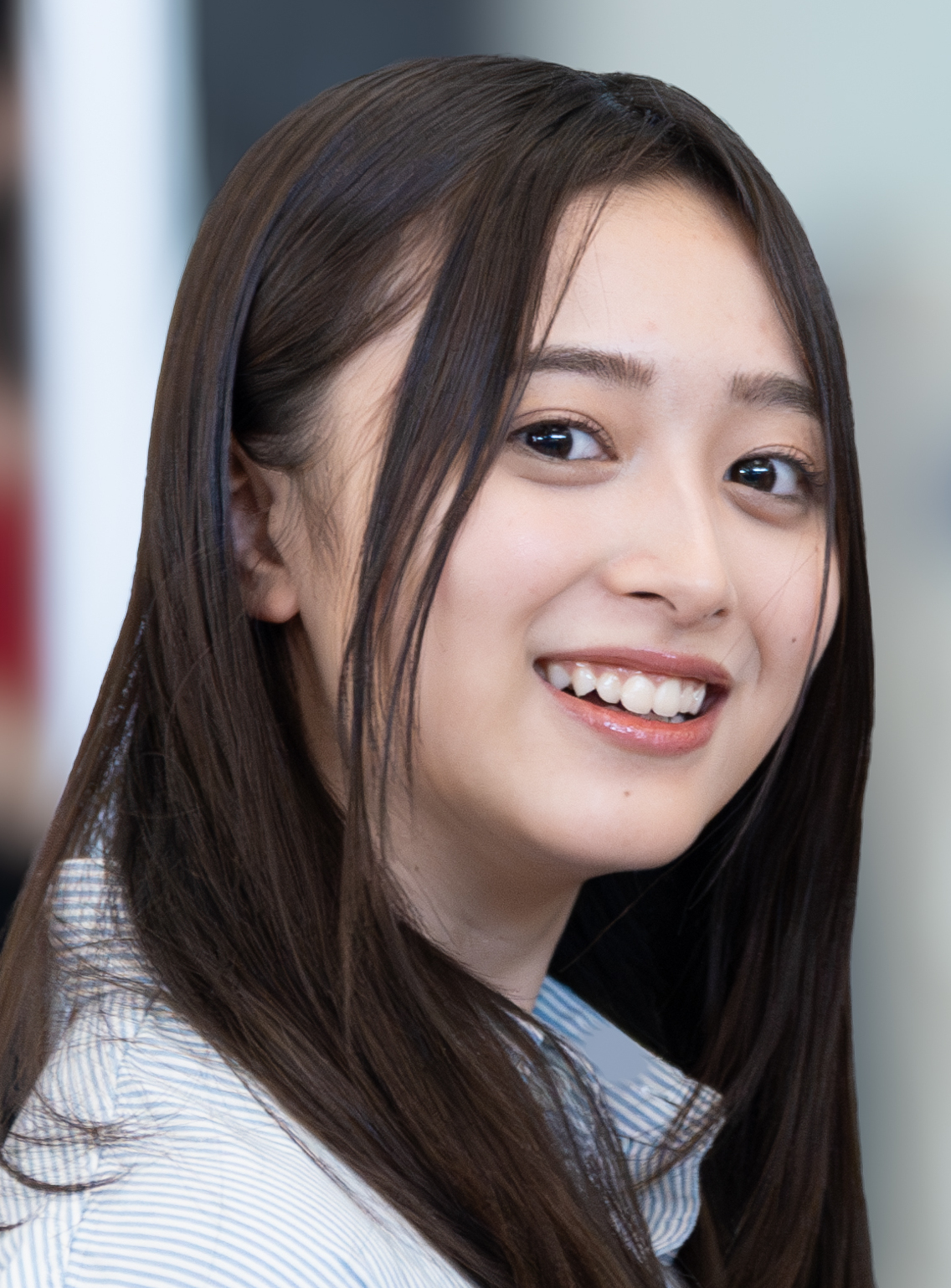
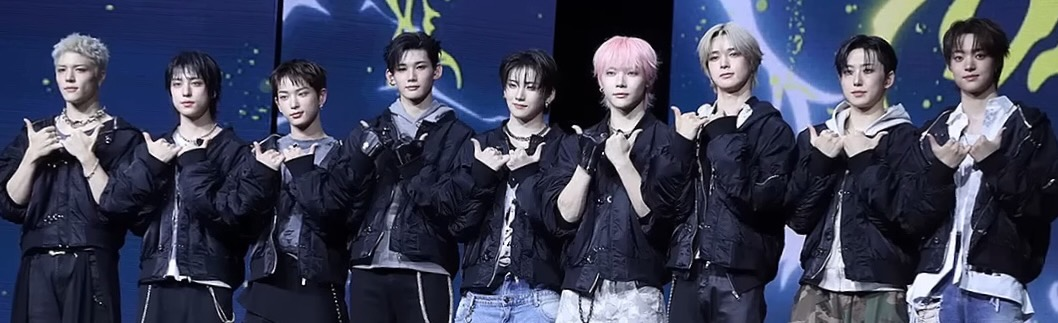
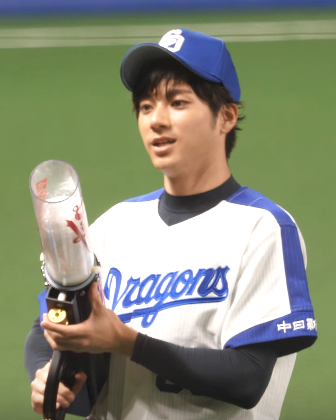
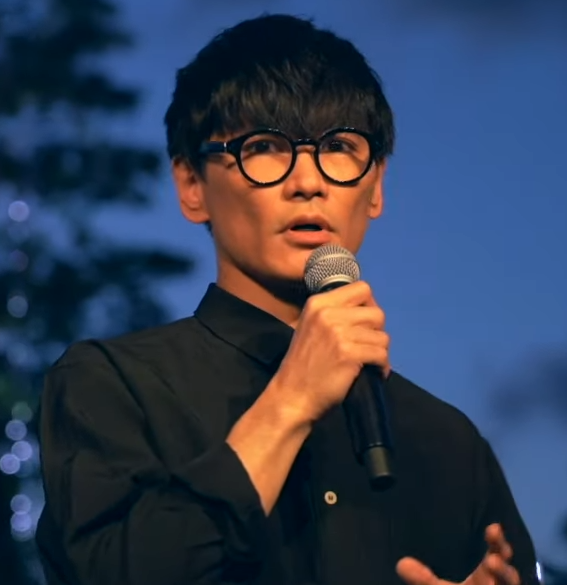
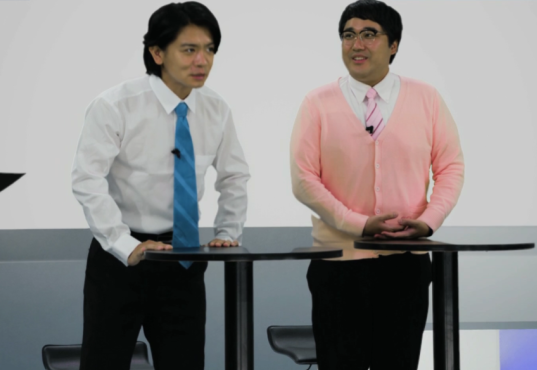
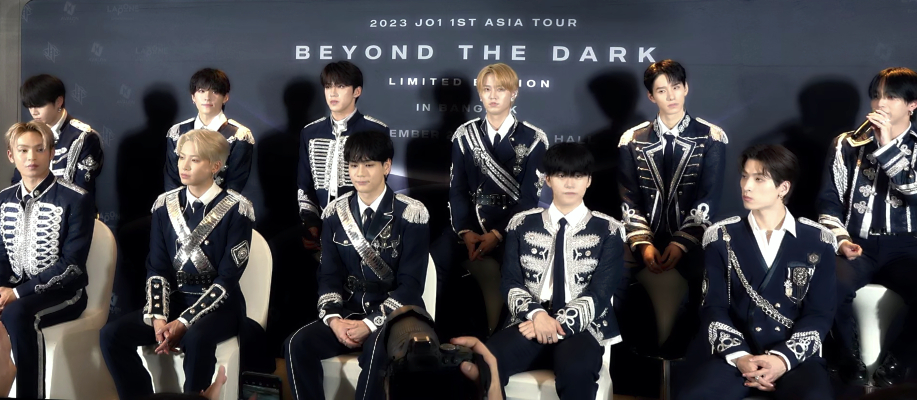
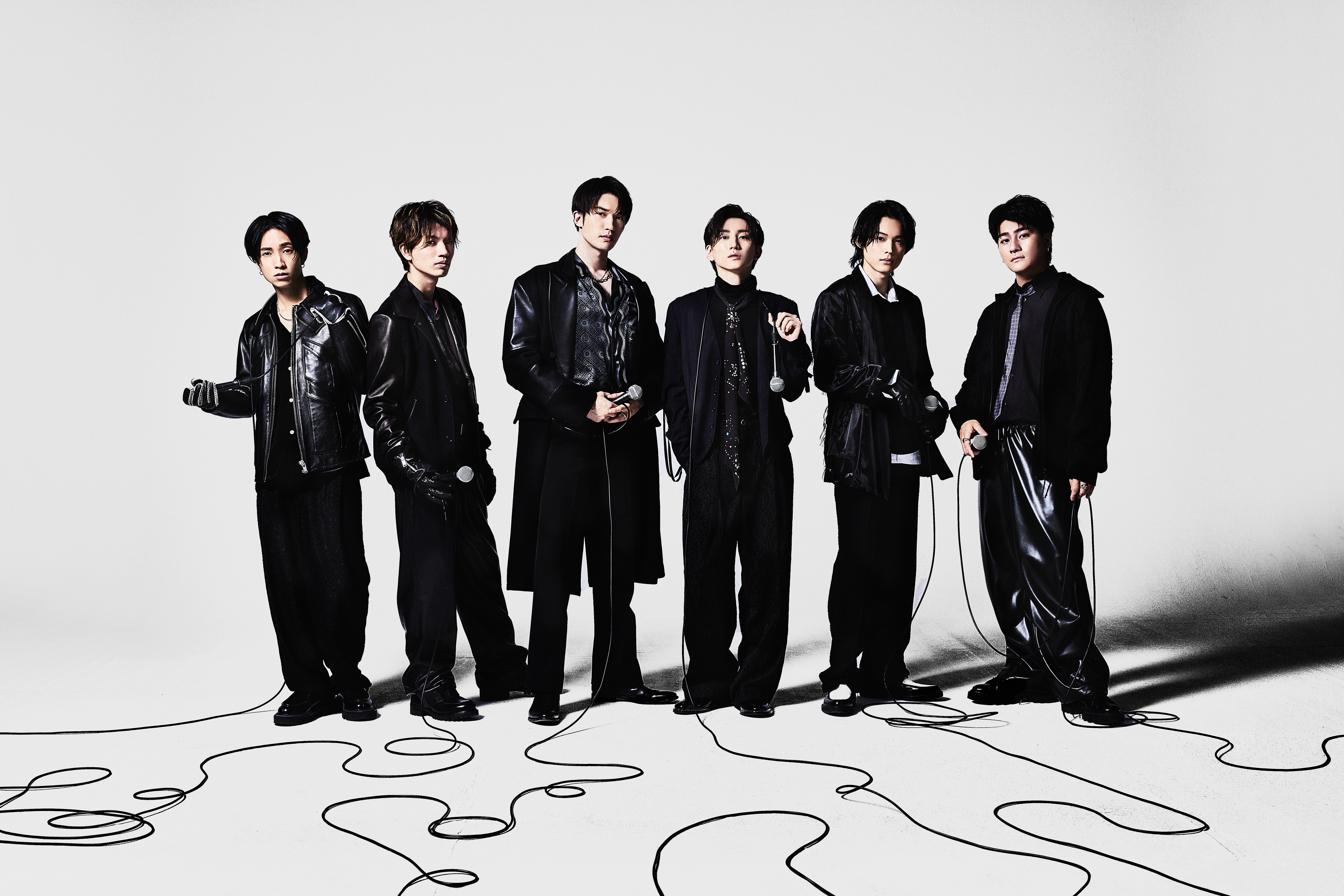
Several All Night Nippon radio personalities. From top left to right: Fruits Zipper, Yōko Shōgenji, Konoka Matsuda, Nagi Inoue, &TEAM, Yuki Yamada, Ichiro Yamaguchi, Magical Lovely, JO1, SixTones

The days of the week below refer to the evening the broadcast begins in Japan (JST), which corresponds to the same day in UTC for these late-night slots.

=== All Night Nippon Music 10 ===
All Night Nippon Music 10 (オールナイトニッポンMUSIC10) is broadcast Monday–Thursday, 13:00–15:00 UTC.

- Mondays: Ryoko Moriyama
- Tuesdays: Anju Suzuki
- Wednesdays: Yūko Natori (1st & 3rd), Chisato Moritaka (2nd), Kaori Kishitani (4th)
- Thursdays: Marina Watanabe

=== All Night Nippon X ===
All Night Nippon X (Cross) (オールナイトニッポンX) is broadcast Monday–Friday, 15:00–16:00 UTC.

- Mondays: Fruits Zipper
- Tuesdays: Fumiya Takahashi
- Wednesdays: JO1 (Main personality: Ruki Shiroiwa)
- Thursdays: Yōko Shōgenji (Hinatazaka46)
- Fridays: Weekly/Monthly Rotating Personalities (e.g., Hana, Starglow, &Team)

=== All Night Nippon ===
The flagship All Night Nippon (オールナイトニッポン) is broadcast Monday–Saturday, 16:00–18:00 UTC.

- Mondays: Yuki Yamada
- Tuesdays: Ichiro Yamaguchi (Sakanaction)
- Wednesdays: Nogizaka46 (Main personality: Nagi Inoue)
- Thursdays: Takashi Okamura (Ninety-nine)
- Fridays: Shimofuri Myojo
- Saturdays: Audrey

=== All Night Nippon 0 ===
All Night Nippon 0 (Zero) (オールナイトニッポン0) is broadcast Monday–Thursday, 18:00–19:30 UTC, and Fridays and Saturdays, 18:00–20:00 UTC.

- Mondays: Tatsuya Kitani
- Tuesdays: Konoka Matsuda
- Wednesdays: Nobuyuki Sakuma
- Thursdays: Magical Lovely
- Fridays: Sanshiro
- Saturdays: Weekly Rotating Personalities (Final Saturday: Yarlens)

=== SixTones's All Night Nippon Saturday Special ===
SixTones's All Night Nippon Saturday Special (SixTONESのオールナイトニッポンサタデースペシャル) is broadcast Saturdays, 14:30–16:00 UTC.

- SixTones

=== Specials ===
Yonino Channel's All Night Nippon Premium (October 22, 2024, as part of the Nippon Broadcasting System 70th Anniversary celebrations)

All Night Nippon 55th/70th Anniversary Special (Various rotating legacy hosts scheduled throughout 2025–2026)

== Jingle ==
Before commercial breaks, a jingle is sung. The current one is performed by Gen Hoshino.

Other artists who sang the ANN Jingle include:

- kz (livetune) x HachiojiP (Vocals: Hatsune Miku)
- Man with a Mission
- Yu Sakai
- Girl Next Door
- Remark Spirits
- !wagero!
- Hanako Oku
- Tommy February^{6}
- Sum 41
- Changing My Life (.com)
- savage genius (SUPER)
- smorgas
- Unknown
- Ram Jam World
- Charmysmile & Greenhead
- Ken Hirai
- L⇔R
- Selfish
- Keizo Nakanishi
- To Be Continued
- Crayon-sha
- Hiroko Taniyama
- Miyuki Nakajima
- Junko Ohashi
- Taeko Onuki
- Toshiki Kadomatsu
- Mariya Takeuchi
- Tatsuro Yamashita
- EPO
- The Three Graces

== Other media ==
In 1986, Nintendo developed All Night Nippon Super Mario Bros., a special Family Computer Disk System version of Super Mario Bros., as a contest prize. The game mostly consisted of levels from the original Super Mario Bros., though it also included some levels, graphics, and other gameplay changes from the Japanese Super Mario Bros. 2. Some enemies, characters, and level elements had their graphics changed to reflect people or symbols associated with All Night Nippon or the Nippon Broadcasting System.

== See also ==
- All Night Fuji
