= Takashi Okamura =

Takashi Okamura may refer to:

- Takashi Okamura (comedian) (born 1970), Japanese comedian
- Takashi Okamura (photographer) (born 1927), Japanese photographer
