= Nao Kosaka =

Japanese singer, model, and actress (born 2002)

- 小坂 菜緒
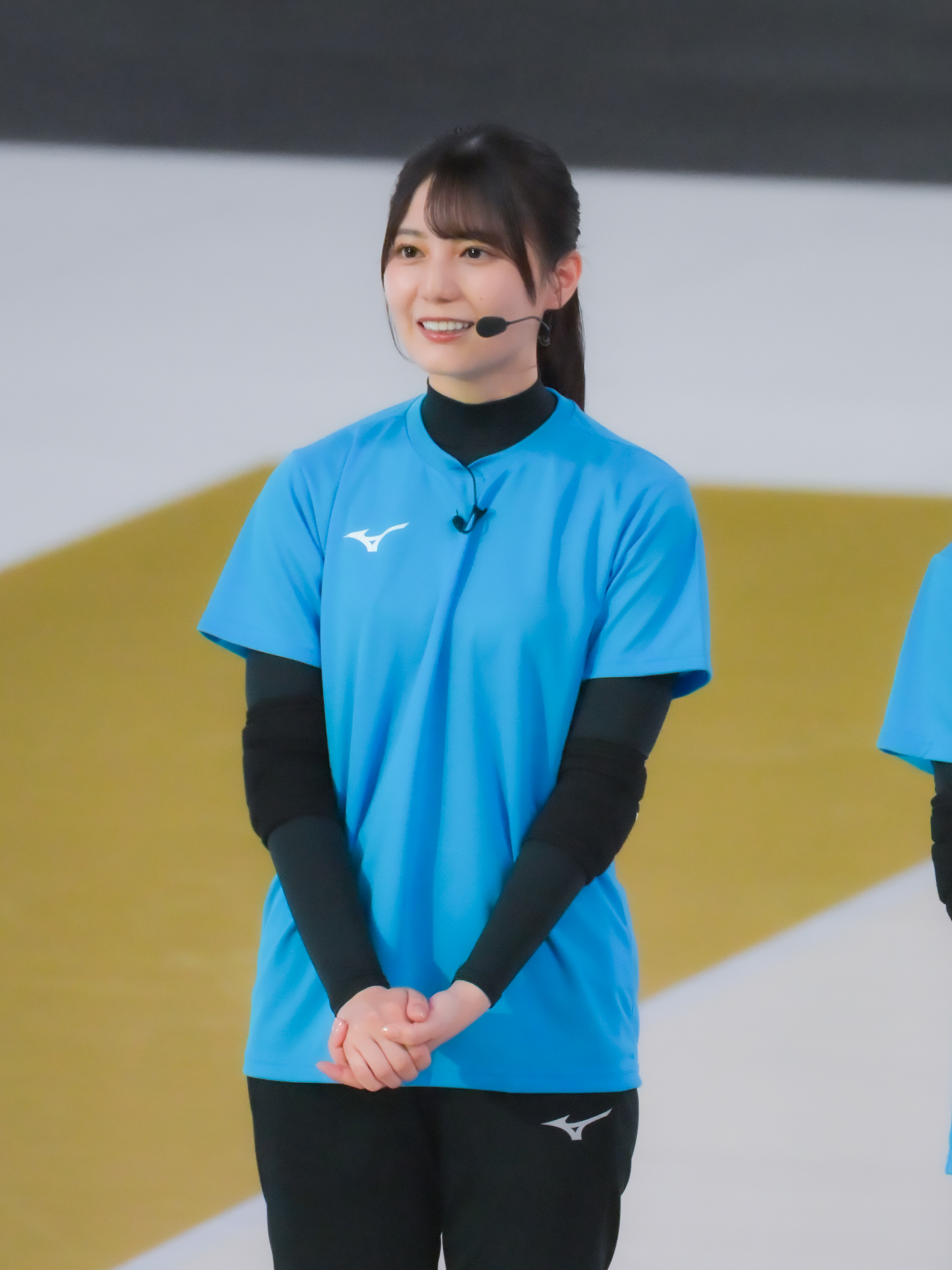
- Kosaka in 2025
- Born: September 7, 2002 (age 24); Osaka, Japan
- Occupations: Singer; model; actress
- Years active: 2017–present
- Musical career
- Label: Sony Music
- Member of: Hinatazaka46
- Modeling information
- Height: 161.5 cm (5 ft 4 in)
- Hair color: black
- Eye color: brown

Autograph
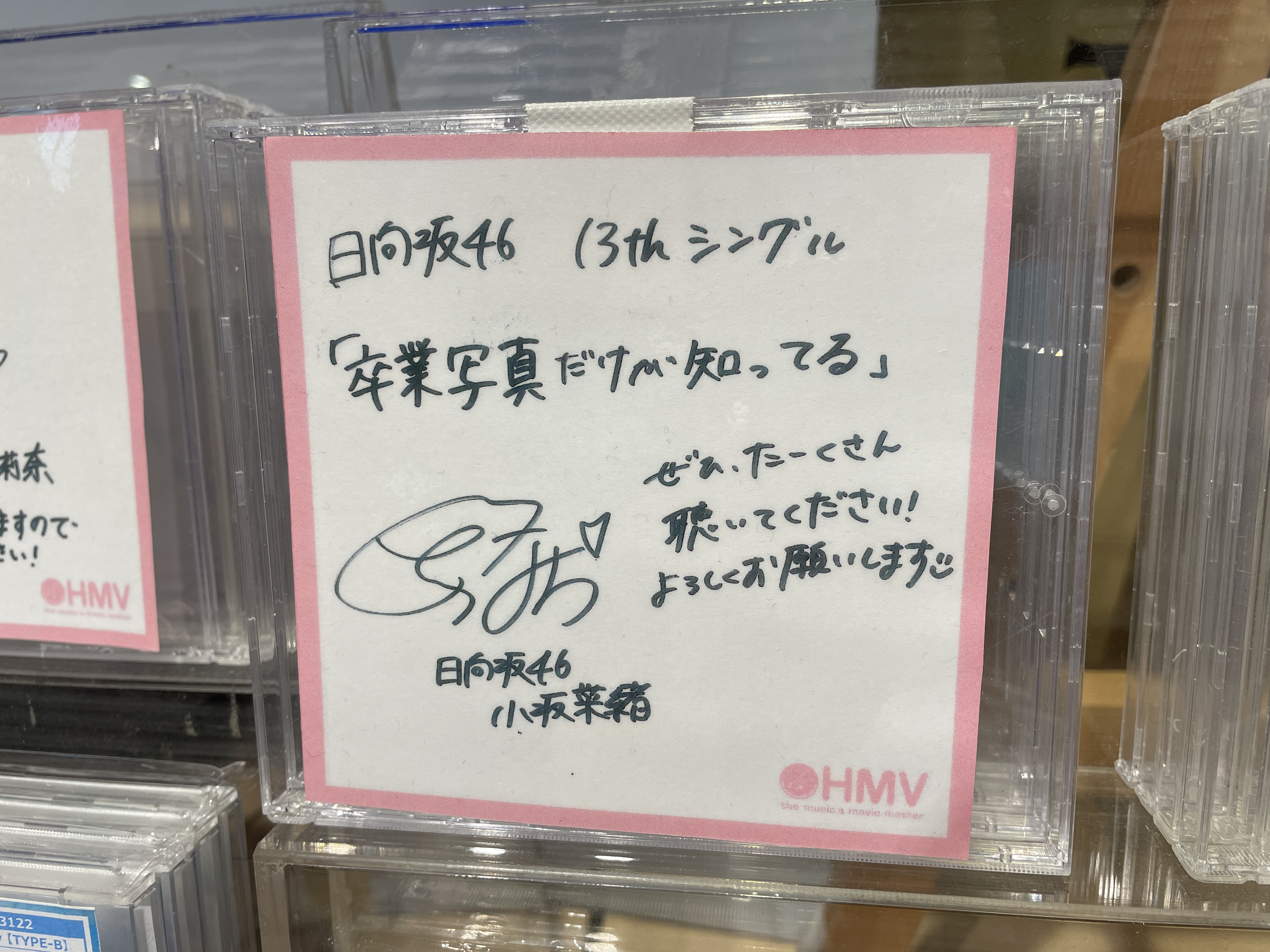

Nao Kosaka (Japanese: 小坂 菜緒, Hepburn: Kosaka Nao; born September 7, 2002) is a Japanese singer, model, and actress. She is a member of the girl group Hinatazaka46 (formerly Hiragana Keyakizaka46) and an exclusive model for the fashion magazine Non-no.

Kosaka was the lead performer for Hinatazaka46's first four singles, earning her the moniker "Absolute Ace". Prior to signing with Non-no in 2025, she was an exclusive model for Seventeen magazine from 2018 to 2024. She has appeared in the feature films The Japanese Doll (2019) and Jump!! The Heroes Behind the Gold (2021), and the drama series Dear Radiance (2024) and Strobe Edge (started 2025). She has also served as a brand ambassador for Sony Assurance since 2022 and hosted the radio program Sony Assurance Quest for the Future on J-Wave since 2023.

== Career ==
=== 2017−2018: Early career, modeling debut ===
On August 13, 2017, Kosaka passed the auditions for new members of Keyakizaka46's subgroup Hiragana Keyakizaka46 and she was introduced two days later as one of the group's second-generation members. She made her debut in the song "No War in the Future", released on the Keyakizaka46 single "Kaze ni Fukarete mo".

On May 19, 2018, Kosaka made her runway debut at the GirlsAward 2018 Spring/Summer show in May 2018. Seventeen announced two days later that she would be one of the magazine's exclusive models, making her the first Hiragana Keyakizaka46 member to become an exclusive model.

=== 2019−2021: Becoming Hinatazaka46's ace, film debut, hiatus ===
Hiragana Keyakizaka46 was renamed to Hinatazaka46 in February 2019. Kosaka held the center (lead performer) position for the title song of their debut single, "Kyun", and the next consecutive three singles, earning her the moniker "Absolute Ace" (絶対的エース, Zettaiteki Ēsu).

Aside from appearing in the group's television dramas Re:Mind (2017) and Dasada (2020), Kosaka made her silver screen debut as the main character of the 2019 mystery film The Japanese Doll (恐怖人形, Kyōfu Ningyō). She then appeared in Jump!! The Heroes Behind the Gold, a 2021 film about ski jumping at the 1998 Winter Olympics, in which her character is based on ski jumper Yoshiko Yoshiizumi (吉泉賀子); Hominis commented that despite performing alongside more experienced cast members, she maintained a unique presence by acting "from the heart".

Kosaka's solo photobook, titled Kimi wa Dare?, published by Seventeen publisher Shueisha and produced by the Seventeen magazine editorial staff, was released on June 29, 2021. She remarked that she had always wished to release a photobook in her teenage years, and that the book was shot over "a long period of time" to capture the "girl vibes" of a high school student and "girlfriend vibes" of a more mature high school graduate at her age of 18, making it a "memory album" of her youth. The book set the record for first-print run among Sakamichi Series debut solo photobooks at the time at 170,000 copies and topped the Oricon 2021 photobook sales chart with nearly 167,000 copies sold.

Kosaka has been noted for her interest in dinosaurs and reptiles, the latter of which she shares with her role model, actress and former Nogizaka46 member Nanase Nishino. Her favorite dinosaur is the Triceratops, which was referenced in the social media accounts promoting her photobook being named "kosakanatops". She has done several dinosaur-themed magazine photoshoots and was a special guest in the opening of the 2020 collaborative attraction between Universal Studios Japan and the anime film Doraemon: Nobita's New Dinosaur, alongside fellow member Shiho Katō. She was appointed as an ambassador for Sony's DinoScience exhibition, held from July to September 2021 at the Pacifico Yokohama, for which she designed official merchandise items and provided her voice for the audio guide. However, she went into hiatus on June 26 for health reasons and did not participate in the rest of the event. She also did not take part in Hinatazaka46's sixth single, "Tteka", but a Triceratops plushie appears in the end of the music video. Her radio program, Kosaka-na Radio (小坂なラジオ) on Tokyo FM, was taken over by fellow member Mirei Sasaki and later renamed to Hoimīpan (ホイミーぱん). (Note: Hoimi is a healing spell from the Dragon Quest game series, referring to the program's sponsor, the now-discontinued mobile game Dragon Quest of the Stars; Mīpan is Sasaki's nickname.)

=== 2022−2024: Comeback, Sony insurance ambassador ===
Kosaka announced her resumption of activities on March 4, 2022, and made her comeback on March 30 in the third Hinatansai anniversary concert, Hinatazaka46's long-awaited first performance at the Tokyo Dome. She also returned to the center position for "Boku Nanka", despite her "mixed feelings" about the appointment.

In a late 2021 survey by Talent Power Ranking, Kosaka was ranked the seventh most popular teen actress in Japan (under 20 years old as of February 2022) based on public recognition and interest. Despite that, Kosaka did not appear in any acting work since returning from hiatus until 2024, when she joined the cast for the taiga drama Dear Radiance as Heian-era poet Sai'in no Chūjō, and appeared as supporting character Rin Arikawa in the feature film All of Tokyo!, starring the Hinatazaka46 fourth-generation members.

Since 2022, Kosaka has served as a brand ambassador for Sony Assurance (ソニー損保, Sonī Sonpo), appearing in various television commercial campaigns for its auto insurance product line. These include solo spots and series alongside actresses Yuki Uchida and Asuka Saitō, as well as those featuring fellow Hinatazaka46 members Hinano Kamimura in 2024 and Kaho Fujishima and Yōko Shōgenji in 2025 and 2026. Additionally, Kosaka provided her voice for the company's Good Drive mobile application and has hosted the radio program Sony Assurance Quest for the Future on J-Wave since 2023. In 2024, Kosaka provided her voice again for that year's Sony DinoScience exhibition, held in her hometown of Osaka.

Kosaka, along with Miku Kanemura and Yōko Shōgenji, was a subject of the Triangle Magazine 02 photo collection, or "visual magazine", published by Kodansha on January 23, 2024. Among the three models, she represented the theme "reunion". It placed first on both the Oricon Book and Photobook weekly rankings of its release week with 61 thousand copies sold.

=== 2025−present: Joining Non-no, anime song, leading Hinatazaka46 ===
In November 2024, Kosaka ended her exclusive modelling contract with Seventeen after 6.5 years, expressing her wish to be seen more as an adult woman and an idol. On March 7, 2025, the fashion magazine Non-no announced that she would be one of its exclusive models; she remarked that she became a reader herself in middle school when Nanase Nishino became an exclusive model. She graced the magazine's cover for the first time on its April 2026 issue.

Kosaka served as center for all three Hinatazaka46 singles released in 2025. On the upcoming departures of the three remaining founding members and arrivals of the new fifth-generation members, Kosaka commented in January that she felt a responsibility to lead the group, in particular to guide fourth-generation members Yōko Shōgenji and Kaho Fujishima, who stood on either side of her in the formation for "Sotsugyō Shashin Dake ga Shitteru", released the same month. She also emphasized that she had no immediate plans to leave the group, despite the single's graduation theme. Bubka magazine described the sixth Hinatansai anniversary concert in April as a succession ceremony of "Hinatazaka-ism", with Kosaka spontaneously telling departing captain Kumi Sasaki "Leave Hinatazaka46 to me", expressing her resolve to lead the "new Hinatazaka46" alongside her fellow second-generation members. "Love Yourself!", released in May, is both the first single without the founding members and the debut of the fifth-generation members, and she shared the center position with fellow second-generation member Miku Kanemura in "Onegai Bach!", released in September. She has held the center position for the most singles in the group with eight singles.

Kosaka appeared in the 2025 drama adaptation of Strobe Edge, which ran for two seasons, and portrayed prison nurse Sachi Hashimoto in the 2026 NHK drama Maison Prison. She made her voice acting debut together with Fujishima in the anime film That Time I Got Reincarnated as a Slime the Movie: Tears of the Azure Sea, released on February 27, 2026, and together with Fujishima and Shōgenji became the first Hinatazaka46 members to perform an anime song, as featured artists in "Romantic ga Hoshiinara" by BocchiBoromaru for season two of The Elusive Samurai.

== Personal life ==
Kosaka played volleyball in middle school and occasionally demonstrates her skill in her appearances. She has an older brother who is a Keyakizaka46 fan.

Kosaka enjoys watching anime and reading books and manga, particularly the works of Mitsuru Adachi, and watches and reads a wide variety of anime and manga so that she could "have a conversation" with anyone. She became interested in dinosaurs after studying fossils in elementary school and has been described as a "dinosaur nerd", and is also a reptile lover. She enjoys comedy shows and has named Kazuya Kojima of Unjash, Sandwichman, Jarujaru, and Audrey as her favorite comedians.

== Discography ==
Kosaka has participated in all of Hinatazaka46's singles and albums except "Tteka" (2021). As of February 2026, she has been the original center (lead performer) of the most title songs in the group with eight songs: "Kyun", "Do Re Mi Sol La Si Do", and "Konna ni Suki ni Natchatte Ii no?" in 2019; "Sonna Koto Nai yo" in 2020; "Boku Nanka" in 2022; and "Sotsugyō Shashin Dake ga Shitteru", "Love Yourself!", and "Onegai Bach!" in 2025. Other notable songs include:

- "Kirei ni Naritai" (Hashiridasu Shunkan, 2018), as a trio with Akari Nibu and Miho Watanabe
- "Footsteps" ("Kyun" B-side, 2019), performed by all of the group's exclusive magazine models at the time
- "See Through" (Hinatazaka, 2020), duet with Miku Kanemura ("NaoMiku")
- "Sekai ni wa Thank You! ga Afureteiru" ("Kimi Shika Katan" B-side, 2021), center, second generation members song
- "Mou Konna ni Suki ni Narenai" ("Boku Nanka" B-side, 2022), performed by all members born in 2002 at the time (Kosaka, Miku Kanemura, and Hiyori Hamagishi)

=== Collaborations ===
- "Hatsukoi Door" (AKB48 single "Jiwaru Days" B-side, 2019), Sakamichi Series collaboration with the AKB48 Group (SakamichiAKB)
- "Romantic ga Hoshiinara" (ロマンティックがほしいなら; lit. 'If You're Looking for Romance') by BocchiBoromaru, The Elusive Samurai second ending song (2026), featured artist with Yōko Shōgenji and Kaho Fujishima

== Filmography ==
=== Film ===
Kosaka's film appearances
Year	Title	Role	Notes	Ref(s)
2019	The Japanese Doll	Yuri Hirai	Lead role	
2021	Jump!! The Heroes Behind the Gold	Yoshiko Kobayashi		
2024	All of Tokyo!	Rin Arikawa		
2026	That Time I Got Reincarnated as a Slime the Movie: Tears of the Azure Sea	Mio (voice)		

=== Television ===
Kosaka's television series appearances
Year	Title	Role	Notes	Ref(s)
2017	Re:Mind	Nao Kosaka	Episode 13; episode lead role	
2020	Dasada	Yuria Sada		
2024	Dear Radiance	Saiin no Chūjō	Taiga drama	
2025–2026	Strobe Edge	Sayuri Uehara	2 seasons	
2026	Maison Prison	Sachi Hashimoto		
2026	Kidnap Game	Honoka Toeda	Episode 2	

=== Commercials ===
Commercials
- Kansai Electric Power Company "Electricity is Warmth" (2024) on YouTube
- Sony Assurance "Getting Started with Auto Insurance" (2025−2026) playlist on YouTube

- FineToday (2022)
- Sony Assurance (Sony Financial Group) (2022–present)
- Kansai Electric Power Company (2024–present)
- Benzablock Premium DX (Alinamin Pharmaceuticals) (2025)

=== Music video ===
Music video
- "Spiral" on YouTube

Kosaka's appearances in other artists' music videos
Year	Artist	Title	Notes	Ref(s)
2019	Thinking Dogs	"Spiral"	The Japanese Doll theme song	

== Radio ==
- Dragon Quest of the Stars presents Hinatazaka46 Nao Kosaka's Kosaka-na Radio (Tokyo FM, 2021)
- Sony Assurance Quest for the Future (J-Wave, 2023–present)

== Theater ==
Kosaka's stage play appearances
Year	Title	Role(s)	Venue(s)	Ref(s)
2018	Ayumi	Multiple	AiiA 2.5 Theater Tokyo	

== Bibliography ==
Kosaka's bibliography
Title	Release date	Publisher	ISBN
Kimi wa Dare? (君は誰？; lit. 'Who Are You?'; photobook)	June 29, 2021	Shueisha	ISBN 978-4087900415
Triangle Magazine 02 (photo collection)	January 23, 2024	Kodansha	ISBN 978-4065347713
