= Love Yourself! =

- Type A CD cover, featuring Nao Kosaka

Single by Hinatazaka46
- B-side: "German Iris"; "You Are Forever"; "Yarakashita"; "What You Like!"; "Ano ne Sono ne"; "Umikaze to Wagamama"
- Released: May 21, 2025
- Genre: J-pop
- Length: 4:20
- Label: Sony Music Entertainment Japan
- Composers: Susumu Kawaguchi, Shun Kusakawa, Kota Sahara
- Lyricist: Yasushi Akimoto
- Producer: Yasushi Akimoto

Hinatazaka46 singles chronology
"Sotsugyō Shashin Dake ga Shitteru" (2025)	"Love Yourself!" (2025)	"Onegai Bach!" (2025)

Music video
- "Love Yourself!" on YouTube
- "German Iris" on YouTube
- "Umikaze to Wagamama" on YouTube

"Love Yourself!" is the 14th single by Japanese girl group Hinatazaka46, released on May 21, 2025, by Sony Music Entertainment Japan. It features Nao Kosaka as the center (lead performer) and is the first release featuring the group's fifth generation members. The single debuted atop the weekly Oricon Singles Chart.

== Production and release ==
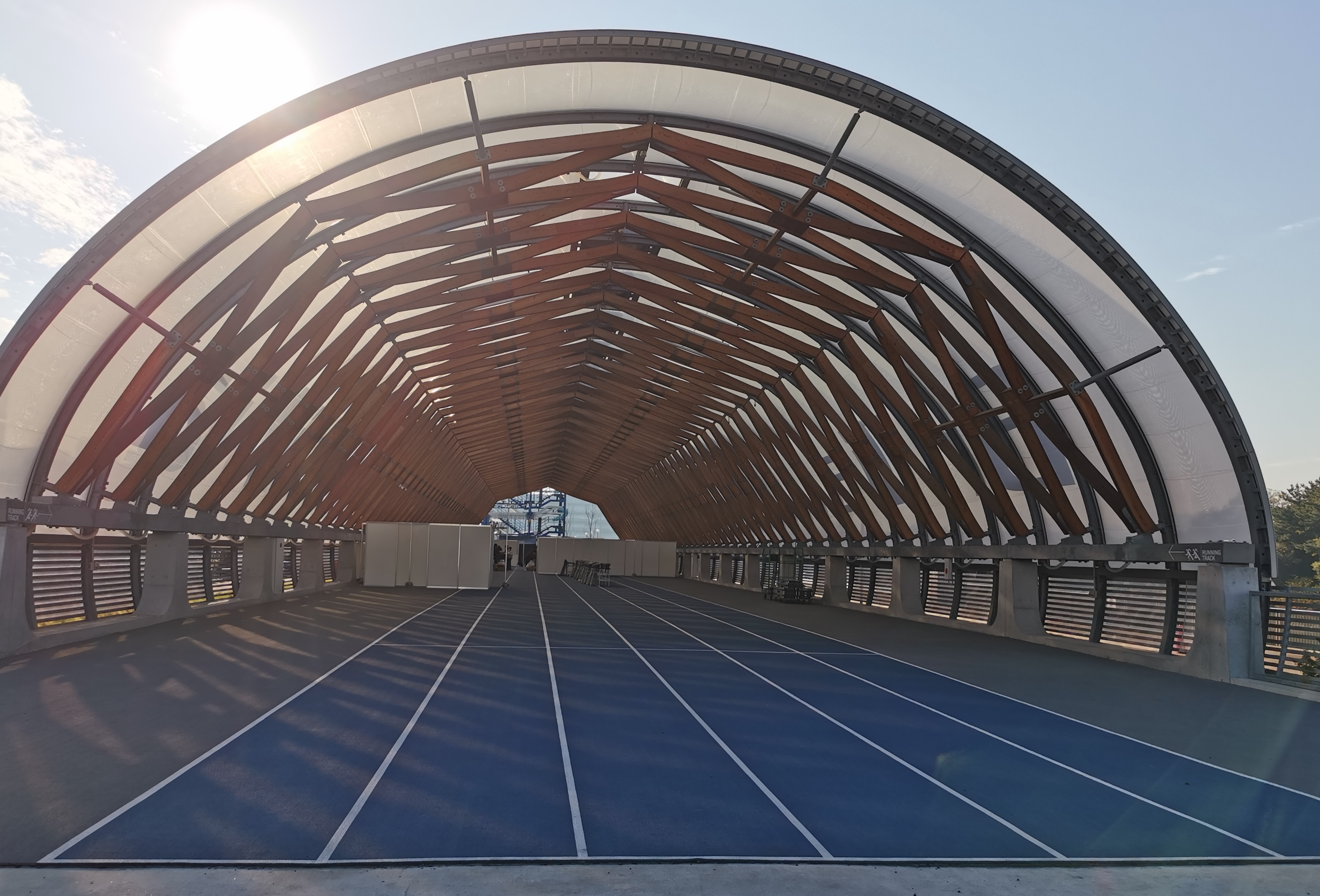
Brillia Running Stadium in Ariake, one of the filming locations of the MV.

"Love Yourself!" was announced at the end of Hinatazaka46's Hinatansai anniversary concert on April 6, 2025. The title track features a lineup consisting of all 20 members from the group's second, third, and fourth generations. Second-generation member Nao Kosaka served as the center (lead performer), retaining the lead position from previous single "Sotsugyō Shashin Dake ga Shitteru". It is the group's first release following both the departure of all its founding first generation members and the debut of its newest fifth generation members.

The single's B-side tracks included the debut exclusive song of the fifth generation members, "German Iris", centered by Manami Ōno. "Ano ne, Sono ne" and "What You Like!" were performed by the front rows of the first two fourth generation exclusive song lineups, "Blueberry & Raspberry" (2022) and "Coelacanth" (2023) respectively. According to Konoka Matsuda, "You Are Forever" was written in memory of a person who "had always supported" the group and had since passed away; the credits section on the single dedicated the release "in memory of Tōru Mogi".

"Love yourself!" was released on physical media on May 21, 2025, in five editions: four limited editions (Types A to D) featuring Blu-ray discs, and a regular CD-only edition.

== Reception ==
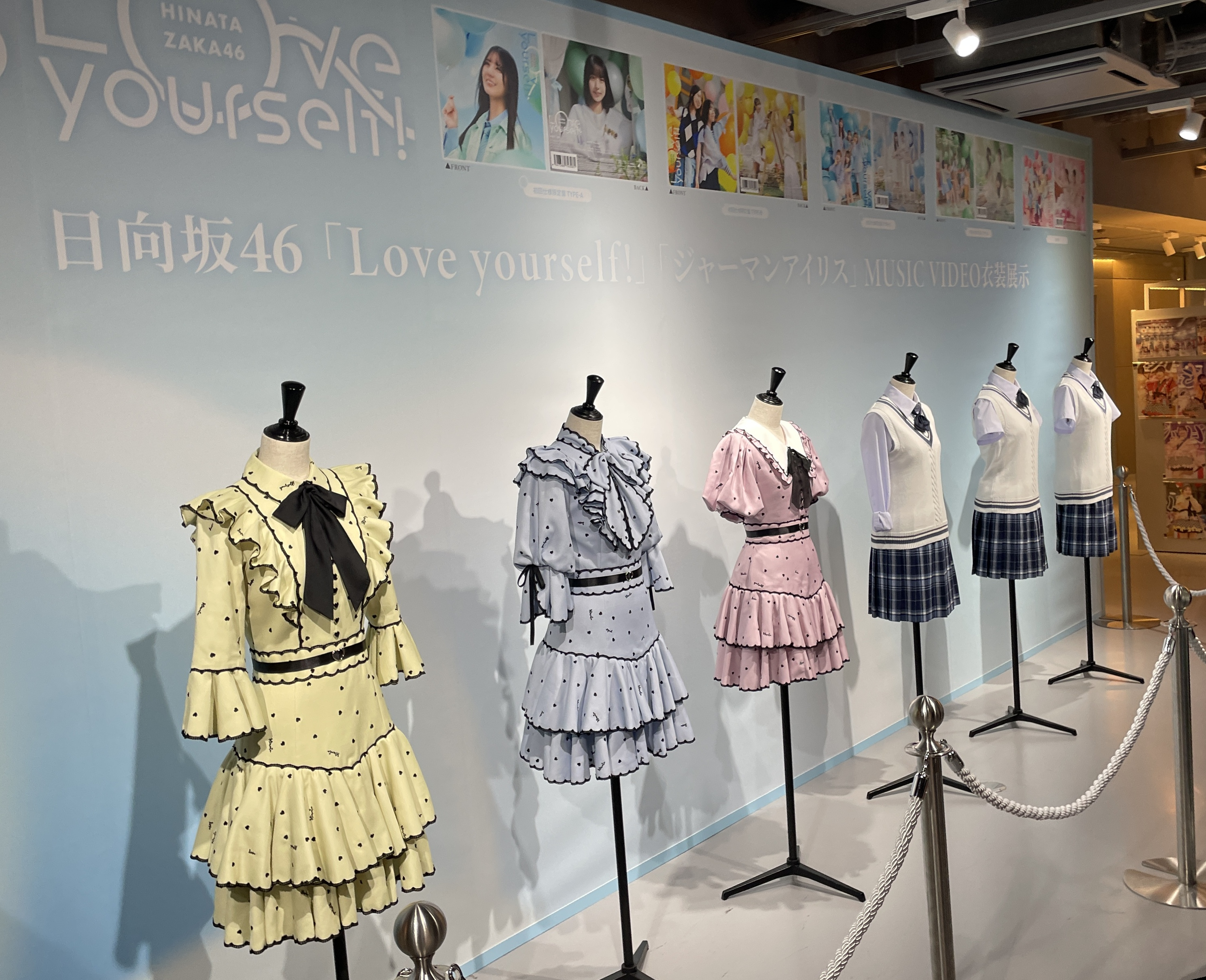
Costume exhibition at the Shibuya Tsutaya record store.

"Love yourself!" debuted at number one on the weekly Oricon Singles Chart, selling over 413,000 physical copies in its first week. This marked Hinatazaka46's 14th consecutive number-one single since their debut, extending their record as the female artist with the most consecutive number-one singles since a debut release. It also topped the Billboard Japan Top Singles Sales chart with 498,635 copies sold in its first week, and peaked at number two on the Billboard Japan Hot 100.

Billboard Japan noted the apt usage of heart imagery in the choreography of the title track's music video, which features the members dancing in various locations to the "conducting" of center Nao Kosaka.

== Track listing ==
1. Love Yourself!
2. "German Iris" (ジャーマンアイリス)
3. Different tracks on each type:
  - Type A: You Are Forever
  - Type B: "Yarakashita" (やらかした; lit. 'I Messed Up')
  - Type C: What You Like!
  - Type D: "Ano ne Sono ne" (あのね そのね; lit. 'Um, You Know')
  - Regular: "Umikaze to Wagamama" (海風とわがまま; lit. 'Sea Breeze and Selfishness')
4. Love Yourself! (off-vocal)
5. German Iris (off-vocal)
6. Off-vocal versions of track 3

== Personnel ==
Lineups obtained from official website.

=== "Love yourself!" ===
Center: Nao Kosaka

- 1st row: Hinano Kamimura, Miku Kanemura, Nao Kosaka, Yōko Shōgenji, Kaho Fujishima
- 2nd row: Haruka Yamashita, Marie Morimoto, Konoka Matsuda, Hina Kawata, Suzuka Tomita, Honoka Hirao, Sumire Miyachi
- 3rd row: Mikuni Takahashi, Mitsuki Hiraoka, Kirari Takeuchi, Rina Watanabe, Haruyo Yamaguchi, Tamaki Ishizuka, Nanami Konishi, Rio Shimizu

=== "German Iris" ===
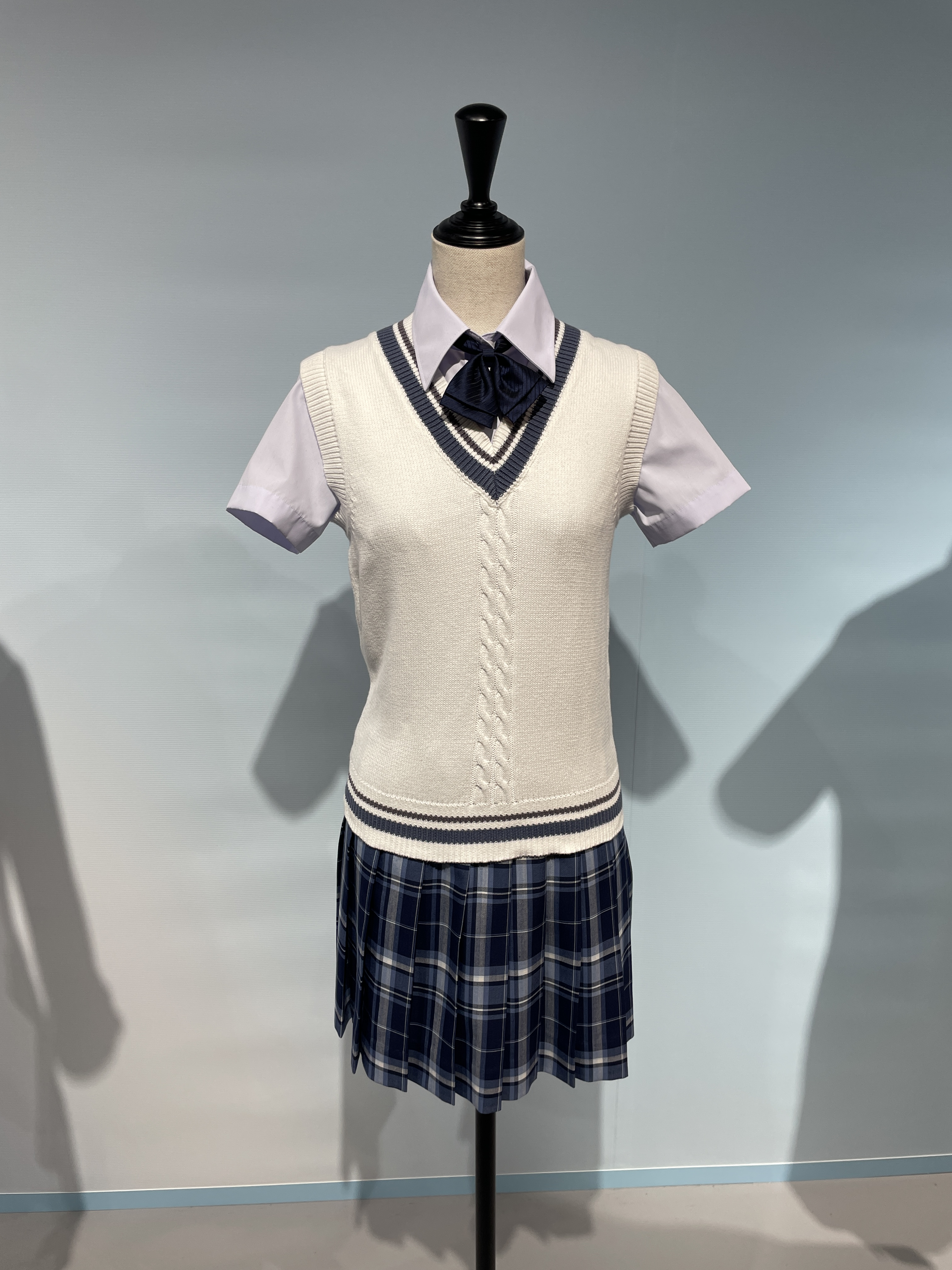
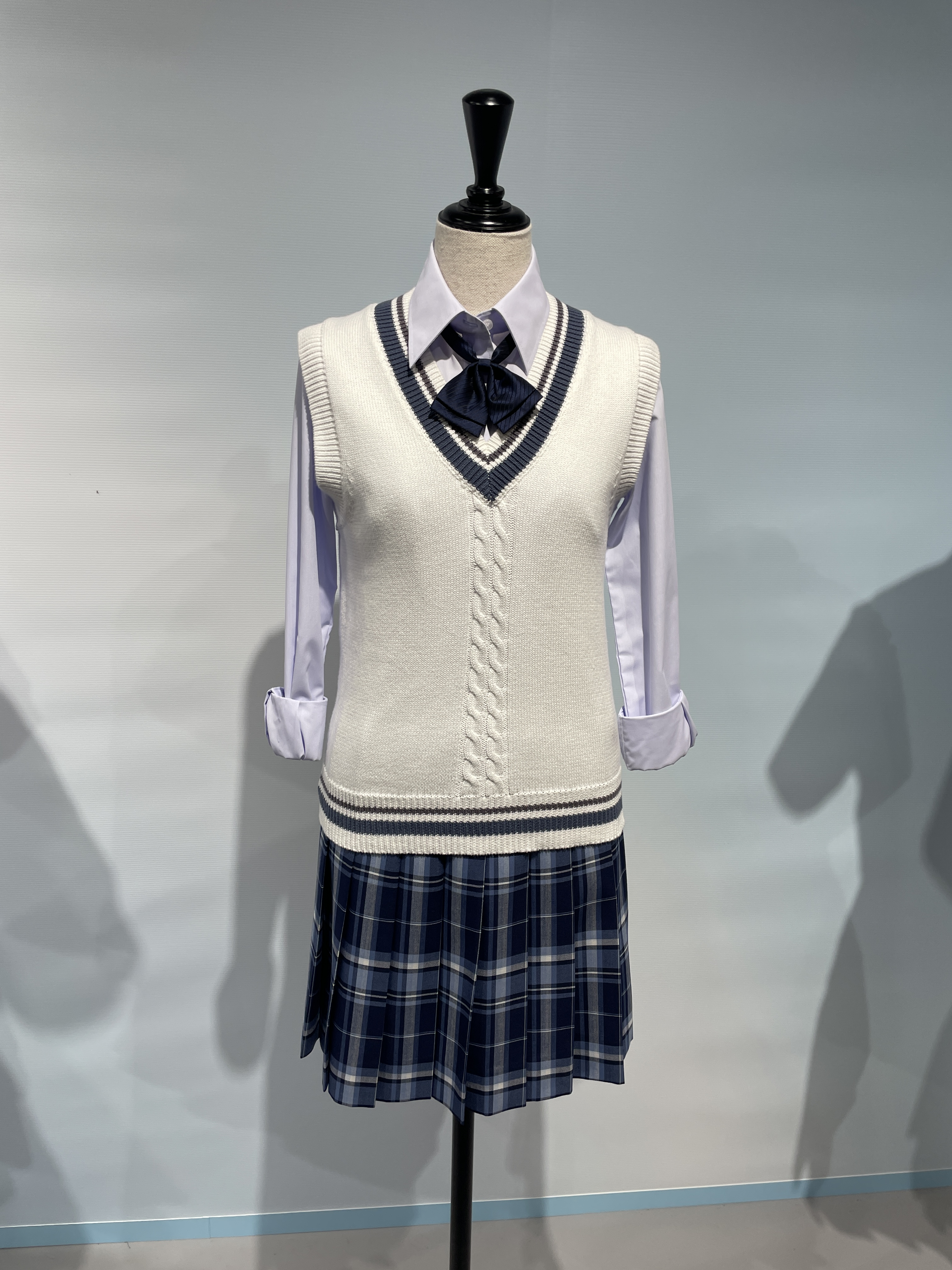
"German Iris" costumes

Center: Manami Ōno

All fifth generation members:

- 1st row: Nina Sakai, Izuki Shimoda, Manami Ōno, Sakura Matsuo, Rika Takai
- 2nd row: Mizuki Ōta, Saki Katayama, Yu Satō, Hinano Kuramori, Niko Tsurusaki

=== "You are forever" ===
Same as "Love Yourself!"

=== "Yarakashita" ===
Miku Kanemura, Hina Kawata, Nao Kosaka

=== "What you like!" ===
Yōko Shōgenji, Kaho Fujishima, Rina Watanabe

=== "Ano ne Sono ne" ===
Nanami Konishi, Rio Shimizu, Sumire Miyachi

=== "Umikaze to Wagamama" ===
Same as "Love Yourself!"

== Charts ==
=== Weekly charts ===
Weekly chart performance for "Love yourself!"
Chart (2025)	Peak position
Japan (Japan Hot 100)	2
Japan (Oricon)	1
Japan Combined Singles (Oricon)	1

=== Monthly charts ===
Monthly chart performance for "Love yourself!"
Chart (2025)	Position
Japan (Oricon)	1

=== Year-end charts ===
Year-end chart performance for "Love yourself!"
Chart (2025)	Position
Japan (Oricon)	17
