= Tteka =

2021 single by Hinatazaka46

- Regular edition cover

Single by Hinatazaka46

from the album Myakuutsu Kanjō
- B-side: "Nando de mo Nando de mo"; "Omoigakenai Double Rainbow" (Type-A); "Yume wa Nansai made?" (Type-B); "Akubi Letter" (Type-C); "Suppai Jiko Keno" (Type-D); "Additional Time" (Regular)
- Released: October 27, 2021
- Genre: J-pop
- Length: 3:58
- Label: Sony Music Entertainment Japan
- Producer: Yasushi Akimoto

Hinatazaka46 singles chronology
"Kimi Shika Katan" (2021)	"Tteka" (2021)	"Boku Nanka" (2022)

Music video
- "Tteka" on YouTube
- "Nando de mo Nando de mo" on YouTube
- "Yume wa Nansai made?" on YouTube
- "Akubi Letter" on YouTube
- "Suppai Jiko Keno" on YouTube

"Tteka" (Japanese: ってか; lit. 'I mean') is the sixth single by Japanese idol group Hinatazaka46. It was released on October 27, 2021 through Sony Music Entertainment Japan and features the first appearance of Miku Kanemura as the lead performer of a title song.

== Production and release ==
The single was released in five versions: Type-A, Type-B, Type-C, Type-D, and a regular edition. All versions except for the regular edition also includes a Blu-ray Disc containing music videos and bonus videos.

Miku Kanemura was chosen as the center (lead performer) of the title song for the first time. Nao Kosaka was on health leave during production and did not participate in the single.

"Nando de mo Nando de mo" was the support song for the 41st All Japan High School Quiz Championship (全国高等学校クイズ選手権).

== Critical reception ==
The "Tteka" music video won the Best Art Direction Award at the 2021 MTV Video Music Awards Japan.

== Track listing ==
Listing obtained from official website. All lyrics written by Yasushi Akimoto.

=== Type-A ===
CD
No.	Title	Length
1.	"Tteka" (ってか)	3:58
2.	"Nando de mo Nando de mo" (何度でも何度でも)	4:15
3.	"Omoigakenai Double Rainbow" (思いがけないダブルレインボー)	4:31
4.	"Tteka" (off vocal ver.)	3:58
5.	"Nando de mo Nando de mo" (off vocal ver.)	4:15
6.	"Omoigakenai Double Rainbow" (off vocal ver.)	4:29
Total length:		25:26

Blu-ray
No.	Title	Length
1.	"Tteka" (Music Video)	4:56
2.	"Nando de mo Nando de mo" (Music Video)	4:29
3.	"Hinata's summer vacation" (Sarina Ushio, Hina Kawata, Hiyori Hamagishi, Manamo Miyata, Marie Morimoto)	42:58
Total length:		52:23

=== Type-B ===
CD
No.	Title	Length
1.	"Tteka" (ってか)	3:58
2.	"Nando de mo Nando de mo" (何度でも何度でも)	4:15
3.	"Yume wa Nansai ma de?" (夢は何歳まで?)	4:14
4.	"Tteka" (off vocal ver.)	3:58
5.	"Nando de mo Nando de mo" (off vocal ver.)	4:15
6.	"Yume wa Nansai ma de?" (off vocal ver.)	4:13
Total length:		24:53

Blu-ray
No.	Title	Length
1.	"Tteka" (Music Video)	4:56
2.	"Yume wa Nansai ma de?" (Music Video)	4:23
3.	"Hinata's summer vacation" (Kyōko Saitō, Kumi Sasaki, Mana Takase, Suzuka Tomita, Miho Watanabe, Haruyo Yamaguchi)	42:49
Total length:		52:08

=== Type-C ===
CD
No.	Title	Length
1.	"Tteka" (ってか)	3:58
2.	"Nando de mo Nando de mo" (何度でも何度でも)	4:15
3.	"Akubi Letter" (あくびLetter)	4:12
4.	"Tteka" (off vocal ver.)	3:58
5.	"Nando de mo Nando de mo" (off vocal ver.)	4:15
6.	"Akubi Letter" (off vocal ver.)	4:10
Total length:		24:48

Blu-ray
No.	Title	Length
1.	"Tteka" (Music Video)	4:56
2.	"Akubi Letter" (Music Video)	4:26
3.	"Hinata's summer vacation" (Yūka Kageyama, Shiho Katō, Mei Higashimura, Konoka Matsuda, Mikuni Takahashi)	40:47
Total length:		50:09

=== Type-D ===
CD
No.	Title	Length
1.	"Tteka" (ってか)	3:58
2.	"Nando de mo Nando de mo" (何度でも何度でも)	4:15
3.	"Suppai Jiko Keno" (酸っぱい自己嫌悪)	4:54
4.	"Tteka" (off vocal ver.)	3:58
5.	"Nando de mo Nando de mo" (off vocal ver.)	4:15
6.	"Suppai Jiko Keno" (off vocal ver.)	4:52
Total length:		26:12

Blu-ray
No.	Title	Length
1.	"Tteka" (Music Video)	4:56
2.	"Suppai Jiko Keno" (Music Video)	5:12
3.	"Hinata's summer vacation" (Mirei Sasaki, Ayaka Takamoto, Miku Kanemura, Akari Nibu, Hinano Kamimura)	40:09
Total length:		50:17

=== Regular edition ===
CD
No.	Title	Length
1.	"Tteka" (ってか)	3:58
2.	"Nando de mo Nando de mo" (何度でも何度でも)	4:15
3.	"Additional Time" (アディショナルタイ厶)	4:36
4.	"Tteka" (off vocal ver.)	3:58
5.	"Nando de mo Nando de mo" (off vocal ver.)	4:15
6.	"Additional Time" (off vocal ver.)	4:35
Total length:		25:37

== Personnel ==
Lineups obtained from official website.

=== "Tteka" ===
Center: Miku Kanemura

- 1st row: Mei Higashimura, Kyōko Saitō, Miku Kanemura, Shiho Katō, Akari Nibu
- 2nd row: Kumi Sasaki, Yūka Kageyama, Konoka Matsuda, Mirei Sasaki, Hina Kawata, Miho Watanabe, Sarina Ushio
- 3rd row: Mikuni Takahashi, Mana Takase, Marie Morimoto, Ayaka Takamoto, Hinano Kamimura, Hiyori Hamagishi, Manamo Miyata, Haruyo Yamaguchi, Suzuka Tomita

=== "Nando de mo Nando de mo" ===
Center: Hinano Kamimura

- 1st row: Hina Kawata, Akari Nibu, Hinano Kamimura, Miku Kanemura, Konoka Matsuda
- 2nd row: Hiyori Hamagishi, Manamo Miyata, Marie Morimoto, Mikuni Takahashi, Haruyo Yamaguchi, Miho Watanabe, Suzuka Tomita
- 3rd row: Kumi Sasaki, Yūka Kageyama, Ayaka Takamoto, Shiho Katō, Mirei Sasaki, Kyōko Saitō, Mei Higashimura, Mana Takase, Sarina Ushio

=== "Omoigakenai Double Rainbow" ===
Center: Miku Kanemura

- 1st row: Mei Higashimura, Kyōko Saitō, Miku Kanemura, Shiho Katō, Akari Nibu
- 2nd row: Kumi Sasaki, Yūka Kageyama, Konoka Matsuda, Mirei Sasaki, Hina Kawata, Miho Watanabe, Sarina Ushio
- 3rd row: Mikuni Takahashi, Mana Takase, Marie Morimoto, Ayaka Takamoto, Hinano Kamimura, Hiyori Hamagishi, Manamo Miyata, Haruyo Yamaguchi, Suzuka Tomita

=== "Yume wa Nansai ma de?" ===
- Mei Higashimura, Ayaka Takamoto

=== "Akubi Letter" ===
- Akari Nibu, Miku Kanemura, Miho Watanabe

=== "Suppai Jiko Keno" ===
- Haruyo Yamaguchi, Hiyori Hamagishi, Mirei Sasaki, Hina Kawata

=== "Additional Time" ===
Center: Miku Kanemura

- 1st row: Mei Higashimura, Kyōko Saitō, Miku Kanemura, Shiho Katō, Akari Nibu
- 2nd row: Kumi Sasaki, Yūka Kageyama, Konoka Matsuda, Mirei Sasaki, Hina Kawata, Miho Watanabe, Sarina Ushio
- 3rd row: Mikuni Takahashi, Mana Takase, Marie Morimoto, Ayaka Takamoto, Hinano Kamimura, Hiyori Hamagishi, Manamo Miyata, Haruyo Yamaguchi, Suzuka Tomita

== Charts ==
=== Weekly charts ===
Weekly chart performance for "Tteka"
Chart (2021)	Peak position
Japan (Japan Hot 100)	1
Japan (Oricon)	1

=== Year-end charts ===
Year-end chart performance for "Tteka"
Chart (2021)	Position
Japan (Oricon)	15

== Certifications ==
Certifications for "Tteka"
Region	Certification	Certified units/sales
Japan (RIAJ)	2× Platinum	500,000^{^}
^{^} Shipments figures based on certification alone.
