= Onegai Bach! =

- Type A cover, featuring Nao Kosaka and Miku Kanemura

Single by Hinatazaka46
- English title: Please, Bach!
- B-side: "Sora Tobu Kuruma"; "Rival Oosugi Mondai"; "Ai wa Kocchi no Mono da 2025"; "Kotoba no Genkai"; "Halloween no Kabocha ga Wareta 2025"; "Expected Value"
- Released: September 17, 2025
- Genre: J-pop
- Length: 4:44
- Label: Sony Music Entertainment Japan
- Composer: Hikaru Ishizaki
- Lyricist: Yasushi Akimoto
- Producer: Yasushi Akimoto

Hinatazaka46 singles chronology
| "Love Yourself!" (2025) | "Onegai Bach!" (2025) | "Cliffhanger" (2026) |

Music video
- "Onegai Bach!" on YouTube
- "Sora Tobu Kuruma" on YouTube
- "Kotoba no Genkai" on YouTube

"Onegai Bach!" (Japanese: お願いバッハ！; lit. 'Please, Bach!') is the 15th single by Japanese girl group Hinatazaka46, released on September 17, 2025, by Sony Music Entertainment Japan. It features Miku Kanemura and Nao Kosaka in a double center (lead performer) position. The single debuted atop the weekly Oricon Singles Chart.

== Production and release ==
The title track features a lineup of all 19 second, third, and fourth generation members, with Miku Kanemura and Nao Kosaka serving as double centers (lead performers). The single marks the final participation of second generation member Hina Kawata, who would leave the group following its release. It is also the group's first single released following the departure of Suzuka Tomita. A sample of Johann Sebastian Bach's Orchestral Suite No. 3, commonly known as "Air on the G String", was included in the title track arrangement.

The single's B-side included the second fifth generation members' exclusive song "Sora Tobu Kuruma", and "Kotoba no Genkai" features Hina Kawata as center. Other B-sides include updated 2025 versions of past tracks with all-new singer lineups: "Ai wa Kocchi no Mono da 2025" was originally performed by the group's founding members, who had all left the group, and released on "One Choice" (2023); "Halloween no Kabocha ga Wareta 2025" was originally on the album Hashiridasu Shunkan (2018), released under the group's previous name, Hiragana Keyakizaka46.

"Onegai Bach!" was released on physical media on September 17, 2025, in five editions: four limited editions (Types A to D) featuring Blu-ray discs, and a regular CD-only edition. The Blu-ray discs included footage from the "Over the Rainbow" concert, held at the Yoyogi National Gymnasium on May 28–29, 2025 (Type A); the fifth generation's introduction live "reception event" (おもてなし会, omotenashi-kai), held at the same venue on May 27, 2025 (Type B); and "personal videos", such as original music videos and short films, by the fifth generation members (Types C and D).

== Reception ==
"Onegai Bach!" debuted at number one on the weekly Oricon Singles Chart, with over 451,000 physical copies sold in its first week, marking the group's 15th consecutive number-one single since their debut. It also topped the Billboard Japan Top Singles Sales chart with 527,439 copies sold in its first week. Furthermore, the Special Edition of the single debuted at number one on the Oricon Weekly Digital Albums ranking.

Natalie praised the "elegant" choreography of the title track's music video, filmed in Hokkaido with the theme of "New Classic", noting in particular the scene where the members were positioned according to the actual musical notations of "Air on the G String" on a large musical stave on the ground.

== Track listing ==
1. "Onegai Bach!"
2. "Sora Tobu Kuruma" (空飛ぶ車; lit. 'Flying Car')
3. Different tracks on each type:
  - Type A: "Rival Oosugi Mondai" (ライバル多すぎ問題; lit. 'Too Many Rivals Problem')
  - Type B: "Ai wa Kocchi no Mono da 2025" (愛はこっちのものだ 2025; lit. 'Love is Our Thing 2025')
  - Type C: "Kotoba no Genkai" (言葉の限界; lit. 'Limits of Words')
  - Type D: "Halloween no Kabocha ga Wareta 2025" (ハロウィンのカボチャが割れた 2025; lit. 'Smashed Halloween Pumpkin 2025')
  - Regular: "Expected value"
4. "Onegai Bach!" (off-vocal)
5. "Sora Tobu Kuruma" (off-vocal)
6. Off-vocal versions of track 3

== Personnel ==
Lineups obtained from official website.

=== "Onegai Bach!" ===
Centers: Miku Kanemura, Nao Kosaka

- 1st row: Kaho Fujishima, Miku Kanemura, Nao Kosaka, Yōko Shōgenji
- 2nd row: Hinano Kamimura, Honoka Hirao, Hina Kawata, Rina Watanabe, Konoka Matsuda, Sumire Miyachi, Mikuni Takahashi
- 3rd row: Kirari Takeuchi, Nanami Konishi, Haruyo Yamaguchi, Tamaki Ishizuka, Haruka Yamashita, Marie Morimoto, Rio Shimizu, Mitsuki Hiraoka

=== "Sora Tobu Kuruma" ===
Center: Sakura Matsuo

All fifth generation members:

- 1st row: Rika Takai, Manami Ōno, Sakura Matsuo, Yu Satō, Niko Tsurusaki
- 2nd row: Nina Sakai, Hinano Kuramori, Saki Katayama, Izuki Shimoda, Mizuki Ōta

=== "Rival Oosugi Mondai" ===
Miku Kanemura, Mikuni Takahashi, Tamaki Ishizuka, Rio Shimizu, Rina Watanabe

=== "Ai wa Kocchi no Mono da 2025" ===
Performed by all members

=== "Kotoba no Genkai" ===
Center: Hina Kawata

- 1st row: Konoka Matsuda, Mikuni Takahashi, Hina Kawata, Miku Kanemura, Nao Kosaka
- 2nd row: Nanami Konishi, Kaho Fujishima, Sumire Miyachi, Haruka Yamashita, Marie Morimoto, Yōko Shōgenji, Rio Shimizu
- 3rd row: Haruyo Yamaguchi, Honoka Hirao, Kirari Takeuchi, Mitsuki Hiraoka, Hinano Kamimura, Tamaki Ishizuka, Rina Watanabe

=== "Halloween no Kabocha ga Wareta 2025" ===
Hinano Kamimura, Marie Morimoto, Honoka Hirao, Mitsuki Hiraoka, Haruka Yamashita

=== "Expected Value" ===
Performed by all members

== Charts ==
=== Weekly charts ===
Weekly chart performance for "Onegai Bach!"
| Chart (2025) | Peak position |
|---|---|
| Japan (Japan Hot 100) | 3 |
| Japan (Oricon) | 1 |
| Japan Combined Singles (Oricon) | 1 |
| Japanese Digital Albums (Oricon) | 1 |

=== Monthly charts ===
Monthly chart performance for "Onegai Bach!"
| Chart (2025) | Position |
|---|---|
| Japan (Oricon) | 1 |

=== Year-end charts ===
Year-end chart performance for "Onegai Bach!"
| Chart (2025) | Position |
|---|---|
| Japan Top Singles Sales (Billboard Japan) | 16 |
| Japan (Oricon) | 15 |
