= Suzuka =

Suzuka may refer to:

- Suzuka (beetle), a genus of beetles in the family Carabidae
- Suzuka (manga), a Japanese manga and anime series
- Suzuka Mountains
- Suzuka, Mie, a city in Mie Prefecture, Japan
  - Suzuka Circuit, a race track
    - 1000km Suzuka, a sports car race
    - Japanese Grand Prix, a Formula 1 Grand Prix often called "Suzuka" after the venue
    - Suzuka 8 Hours, a motorcycle race
    - Suzuka 8 Hours (arcade game)
- "Twilight" Suzuka, a character from the Outlaw Star series
- Suzuka, a character from the Angelic Layer series
- Suzuka, a character from the YuYu Hakusho series
- Suzuka Gozen a figure in Japanese folklore
- Suzuka Mambo a Thoroughbred racehorse
- Silence Suzuka Japanese Thoroughbred racehorse

== People ==
Suzuka (written: 鈴鹿, 涼香, 涼風, 涼夏, すず香, or すずか in hiragana) is a feminine Japanese given name. Notable people with the name include:

- Suzuka Hasegawa (born 2000), Japanese swimmer
- Suzuka Morita (森田 涼花; born 1992), Japanese actress and voice actress
- Suzuka Nakamoto (中元 すず香; born 1997), also known as Su-metal or simply Suzuka
- Suzuka Ohgo (大後 寿々花; born 1993), Japanese actress
- Suzuka Taka (高 涼風; born 1996), Japanese ice hockey player
- Suzuka Tomita (born 2001), Japanese singer and television personality
- Suzuka (born 2001), a member of the Japanese idol group Atarashii Gakko!

== See also ==
- Suzaka, Nagano, a city in Nagano Prefecture, Japan
- Suzuki (disambiguation)
- Suzaku (disambiguation)
