= Konna ni Suki ni Natchatte Ii no? =

2019 single by Hinatazaka46

- Type A cover, featuring Kyoko Saito, lead performer Nao Kosaka, and Shiho Kato

Single by Hinatazaka46

from the album Hinatazaka
- English title: Is It Okay for Me to Like You This Much?
- B-side: "Honto no Jikan"; "Masaka Gūzen…" (Type-A); "Ichiban Sukida to Minna ni Itte ita Shōsetsu no Title o Omoidasenai" (Type-B); "Mama no Dress" (Type-C); "Kawa wa Nagareru" (Regular)
- Released: October 2, 2019
- Genre: J-pop
- Length: 5:19
- Label: Sony Music Entertainment Japan
- Composers: Junya Maesako, 7th Avenue
- Lyricist: Yasushi Akimoto
- Producer: Yasushi Akimoto

Hinatazaka46 singles chronology
"Do Re Mi Sol La Si Do" (2019)	"Konna ni Suki ni Natchatte Ii no?" (2019)	"Sonna Koto Nai yo" (2020)

Music video
- "Konna ni Suki ni Natchatte Ii no?" on YouTube
- "Konna ni Suki ni Natchatte Ii no?" (Hinatazaka de Aimashō version) on YouTube
- "Honto no Jikan" on YouTube

Type B cover

Type C cover

Regular edition cover

"Konna ni Suki ni Natchatte Ii no?" (Japanese: こんなに好きになっちゃっていいの?; "Is It Okay for Me to Like You This Much?") is the third single by Japanese idol group Hinatazaka46. It was released on October 2, 2019 through Sony Music Entertainment Japan. The title track features Nao Kosaka as lead performer, marking her third consecutive appearance in this position. The single debuted at number one on the Oricon Singles Chart with 476,739 copies sold in its first week.

== Release ==
The music video for the main song was recorded at the Kobe Kokusai Hall and the Hyōgo Prefecture Guest House (兵庫県公館) in Kobe, Hyōgo Prefecture.

The single was released in four versions: Type-A, Type-B, Type-C and a regular edition. Type-A features the first song by the guitar duo Hana-chans, "Masaka Gūzen…" (Note: まさか偶然・・・; lit. 'Such Coincidence...') Type-B features member Hinano Kamimura's first solo song, "Ichiban Sukida to Minna ni Itte ita Shōsetsu no Title o Omoidasenai". (Note: 一番好きだとみんなに言っていた小説のタイトルを思い出せない; lit. 'I Can't Remember the Title of the Novel I Told Everyone Was My Favorite')

Aside from the official music video, the group also recorded a long take music video in an episode of their variety show Hinatazaka de Aimashō, which features the members performing various skills such as baton twirling, poi, kendama, and acrobatic jump rope.

== Reception ==
Real Sound commented that the rock-style dance music of "Ichiban Suki da to Min'na ni Itte ita Shōsetsu no Taitoru o Omoidasenai" was "unexpected from a Sakamichi Series group" and compared Hinano Kamimura's "cool and powerful" singing voice to Ami Suzuki.

== Track listing ==
All lyrics written by Yasushi Akimoto.

=== Type-A ===
CD
No.	Title	Length
1.	"Konna ni Suki ni Natchatte Ii no?" (こんなに好きになっちゃっていいの?)	5:19
2.	"Honto no Jikan" (ホントの時間)	5:03
3.	"Masaka Gūzen…" (まさか 偶然…)	5:02
4.	"Konna ni Suki ni Natchatte Ii no?" (off vocal ver.)	5:19
5.	"Honto no Jikan" (off vocal ver.)	5:03
6.	"Masaka Gūzen…" (off vocal ver.)	5:01
Total length:		30:47

Blu-ray
No.	Title	Length
1.	"Konna ni Suki ni Natchatte Ii no?" (music video)	5:29
2.	"Honto no Jikan" (music video)	5:11
3.	"Mao Iguchi ~Hinata Holiday~"	7:50
4.	"Ayaka Takamoto ~Hinata Holiday~"	9:56
5.	"Miku Kanemura ~Hinata Holiday~"	9:53
6.	"Hina Kawata ~Hinata Holiday~"	8:00
7.	"Akari Nibu ~Hinata Holiday~"	9:38
8.	"Manamo Miyata ~Hinata Holiday~"	8:13
Total length:		64:10

=== Type-B ===
CD
No.	Title	Length
1.	"Konna ni Suki ni Natchatte Ii no?" (こんなに好きになっちゃっていいの?)	5:19
2.	"Honto no Jikan" (ホントの時間)	5:03
3.	"Ichiban Sukida to Minna ni Itte ita Shōsetsu no Taitoru o Omoidasenai" (一番好きだとみんなに言っていた小説のタイトルを思い出せない)	4:43
4.	"Konna ni Suki ni Natchatte Ii no?" (off vocal ver.)	5:19
5.	"Honto no Jikan" (off vocal ver.)	5:03
6.	"Ichiban Sukida to Minna ni Itte ita Shōsetsu no Taitoru o Omoidasenai" (off vocal ver.)	4:42
Total length:		30:09

Blu-ray
No.	Title	Length
1.	"Konna ni Suki ni Natchatte Ii no?" (music video)	5:29
2.	"Ichiban Sukida to Minna ni Itte ita Shōsetsu no Taitoru o Omoidasenai" (music video)	5:27
3.	"Sarina Ushio ~Hinata Holiday~"	9:42
4.	"Shiho Katō ~Hinata Holiday~"	10:21
5.	"Kyōko Saitō ~Hinata Holiday~"	7:03
6.	"Kumi Sasaki ~Hinata Holiday~"	8:54
7.	"Mei Higashimura ~Hinata Holiday~"	8:08
8.	"Konoka Matsuda ~Hinata Holiday~"	10:28
Total length:		65:32

=== Type-C ===
CD
No.	Title	Length
1.	"Konna ni Suki ni Natchatte Ii no?" (こんなに好きになっちゃっていいの?)	5:19
2.	"Honto no Jikan" (ホントの時間)	5:03
3.	"Mama no Dress" (ママのドレス)	4:02
4.	"Konna ni Suki ni Natchatte Ii no?" (off vocal ver.)	5:19
5.	"Honto no Jikan" (off vocal ver.)	5:01
6.	"Mama no Dress" (off vocal ver.)	4:01
Total length:		28:45

Blu-ray
No.	Title	Length
1.	"Konna ni Suki ni Natchatte Ii no?" (music video)	5:29
2.	"Mama no Dress" (music video)	4:18
3.	"Mirei Sasaki ~Hinata Holiday~"	9:07
4.	"Mana Takase ~Hinata Holiday~"	8:06
5.	"Nao Kosaka ~Hinata Holiday~"	9:06
6.	"Suzuka Tomita ~Hinata Holiday~"	10:06
7.	"Miho Watanabe ~Hinata Holiday~"	10:09
8.	"Hinano Kamimura ~Hinata Holiday~"	8:54
Total length:		65:15

=== Regular Edition ===
CD
No.	Title	Length
1.	"Konna ni Suki ni Natchatte Ii no?" (こんなに好きになっちゃっていいの?)	5:19
2.	"Honto no Jikan" (ホントの時間)	5:03
3.	"Kawa wa Nagareru" (川は流れる)	4:42
4.	"Konna ni Suki ni Natchatte Ii no?" (off vocal ver.)	5:19
5.	"Honto no Jikan" (off vocal ver.)	5:03
6.	"Kawa wa Nagareru" (off vocal ver.)	4:41
Total length:		30:07

== Personnel ==
=== "Konna ni Suki ni Natchatte Ii no?" ===
Center: Nao Kosaka

- 1st row: Kyōko Saitō, Nao Kosaka, Shiho Katō
- 2nd row: Mei Higashimura, Konoka Matsuda, Miku Kanemura, Mirei Sasaki, Miho Watanabe, Ayaka Takamoto,
- 3rd row: Kumi Sasaki, Suzuka Tomita, Mao Iguchi, Akari Nibu, Hinano Kamimura, Hina Kawata, Mana Takase, Sarina Ushio, Manamo Miyata

=== "Honto no Jikan" ===
Mao Iguchi, Sarina Ushio, Shiho Katō, Kyōko Saitō, Kumi Sasaki, Mirei Sasaki, Mana Takase, Ayaka Takamoto, Mei Higashimura, Miku Kanemura, Hina Kawata, Nao Kosaka, Suzuka Tomita, Akari Nibu, Konoka Matsuda, Manamo Miyata, Miho Watanabe, Hinano Kamimura

=== "Masaka Gūzen…" ===
Suzuka Tomita, Konoka Matsuda

=== "Ichiban Sukida to Minna ni Itte ita Shōsetsu no Taitoru o Omoidasenai" ===
Hinano Kamimura

=== "Mama no Dress" ===
Sarina Ushio, Shiho Katō, Kyōko Saitō, Kumi Sasaki, Ayaka Takamoto

=== "Kawa wa Nagareru" ===
Mao Iguchi, Sarina Ushio, Shiho Katō, Kyōko Saitō, Kumi Sasaki, Mirei Sasaki, Mana Takase, Ayaka Takamoto, Mei Higashimura, Miku Kanemura, Hina Kawata, Nao Kosaka, Suzuka Tomita, Akari Nibu, Konoka Matsuda, Manamo Miyata, Miho Watanabe, Hinano Kamimura

== Charts ==
Weekly charts

Chart (2019)	Peak position
Japan (Japan Hot 100)	1
Japan (Oricon)	1

Year-end charts

Chart (2019)	Position
Japan (Japan Hot 100)	51
Japan (Oricon)	9
