= Yusuke Suzuki =

Yusuke Suzuki (Japanese: すずき ゆうすけ) may refer to:

== People ==
- Yusuke Suzuki (race walker) (鈴木 雄介, born 1988), Japanese race walker
- Yusuke Suzuki (basketball) (鈴木 悠介, born 1997), Japanese basketball player
- Yusuke Suzuki (Sasuke) (鈴木 祐輔, born 1978), Japanese Ninja Warrior contestant on Sasuke; see List of Sasuke competitions
- Yuusuke Suzuki (fl. 21st century), Japanese cartoonist of animation studio Brain's Base

== Fictional characters ==
- Yūsuke Suzuki (鈴木 裕介), a fictional character from AKB49: Ren'ai Kinshi Jōrei

== See also ==
- The dictionary definition of Suzuki at Wiktionary
- The dictionary definition of すずき at Wiktionary
- The dictionary definition of Yusuke at Wiktionary
- The dictionary definition of ゆうすけ at Wiktionary
- All pages with titles containing "ゆうすけ" and "すずき"
- All pages with titles containing "Yusuke" and "Suzuki"
- Suzuki (surname)
- Suzuki (disambiguation)
- Yasuke
- 鈴木悠介
