= Do Re Mi Sol La Si Do =

2019 single by Hinatazaka46

- Regular edition cover

Single by Hinatazaka46

from the album Hinatazaka
- B-side: "Kitsune"; "My God" (Type-A); "Cage" (Type-B); "Yasashisa ga Jama o Suru" (Type-C); "Dash&Rush" (Regular)
- Released: July 17, 2019
- Genre: J-pop
- Length: 5:05
- Label: Sony Music Entertainment Japan
- Producer: Yasushi Akimoto

Hinatazaka46 singles chronology
| "Kyun" (2019) | "Do Re Mi Sol La Si Do" (2019) | "Konna ni Suki ni Natchatte Ii no?" (2019) |

Music video
- "Do Re Mi Sol La Si Do" on YouTube
- "Kitsune" on YouTube
- "Do Re Mi Sol La Si Do" – The First Take version on YouTube

"Do Re Mi Sol La Si Do" (Japanese: ドレミソラシド, Hepburn: Doremisorashido; Do Re Mi Sol La Ti Do) is the second single from Japanese idol group Hinatazaka46. It was released on July 17, 2019, through Sony Music Entertainment Japan. The title track features Nao Kosaka as center. The title track was nominated for 61st Japan Record Awards in the Grand Prix category.

== Release ==
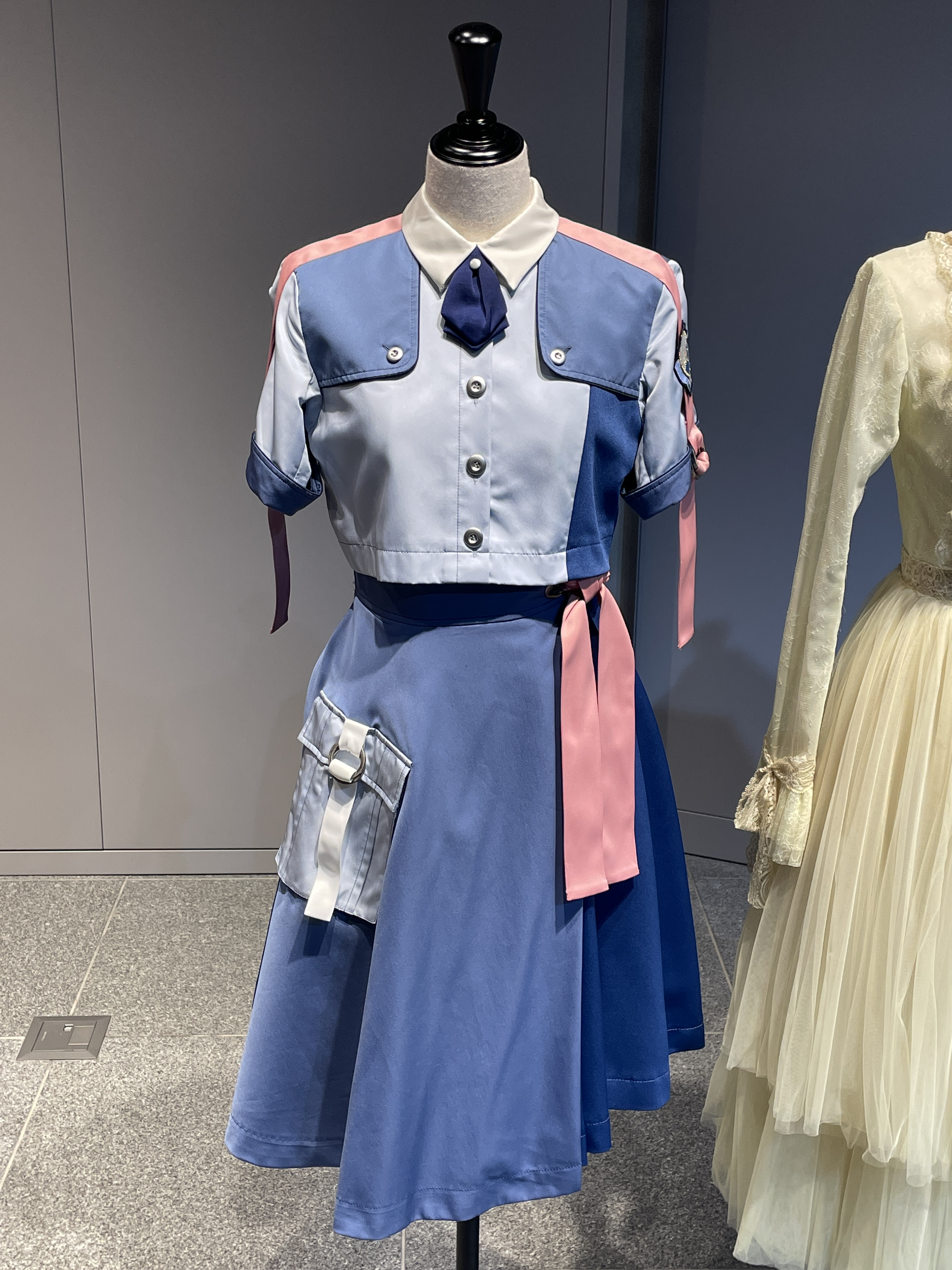
Costume worn in the music video

This single was released in 4 versions. Type-A, Type-B, Type-C and a regular edition. The music video, produced by Hayato Andō, was shot inside an empty swimming pool.

=== Other versions ===
On May 6, 2022, "Do Re Mi Sol La Si Do" became the first Hinatazaka46 song to be featured on the YouTube channel The First Take, performed by Shiho Katō, Kumi Sasaki, Mirei Sasaki, and Suzuka Tomita with an original musical arrangement.

== Track listing ==
All lyrics written by Yasushi Akimoto.

=== Type-A ===
CD
| No. | Title | Length |
|---|---|---|
| 1. | "Do Re Mi Sol La Si Do" (ドレミソラシド) | 5:05 |
| 2. | "Kitsune" (キツネ) | 3:40 |
| 3. | "My God" (,) | 4:10 |
| 4. | "Do Re Mi Sol La Si Do" (off vocal ver.) | 5:05 |
| 5. | "Kitsune" (off vocal ver.) | 3:40 |
| 6. | "My God" (off vocal ver.) | 4:09 |
| Total length: | | 25:49 |

Blu-ray
| No. | Title | Length |
|---|---|---|
| 1. | "Do Re Mi Sol La Si Do" (music video) | 5:13 |
| 2. | "Kitsune" (music video) | 3:52 |
| 3. | "Mei Higashimura, Konoka Matsuda, Miho Watanabe ~I tried pet sitter for the first time~" | 22:13 |
| 4. | "Mao Iguchi, Mirei Sasaki, Hina Kawata ~I went to a spirit spot for the first time~" | 24:01 |
| Total length: | | 55:19 |

=== Type-B ===
CD
| No. | Title | Length |
|---|---|---|
| 1. | "Do Re Mi Sol La Si Do" (ドレミソラシド) | 5:05 |
| 2. | "Kitsune" (キツネ) | 3:40 |
| 3. | "Cage" | 4:36 |
| 4. | "Do Re Mi Sol La Si Do" (off vocal ver.) | 5:05 |
| 5. | "Kitsune" (off vocal ver.) | 3:40 |
| 6. | "Cage" (off vocal ver.) | 4:34 |
| Total length: | | 26:40 |

Blu-ray
| No. | Title | Length |
|---|---|---|
| 1. | "Do Re Mi Sol La Si Do" (music video) | 5:13 |
| 2. | "Cage" (music video) | 4:52 |
| 3. | "Shiho Katō, Nao Kosaka, Hinano Kamimura ~I went to a super luxury sushi restaurant for the first time~" | 22:05 |
| 4. | "Sarina Ushio, Kumi Sasaki, Suzuka Tomita ~I tried fishing bingo for the first time~" | 24:26 |
| Total length: | | 56:36 |

=== Type-C ===
CD
| No. | Title | Length |
|---|---|---|
| 1. | "Do Re Mi Sol La Si Do" (ドレミソラシド) | 5:05 |
| 2. | "Kitsune" (キツネ) | 3:40 |
| 3. | "Yasashisa ga Jama o Suru" (やさしさが邪魔をする) | 4:27 |
| 4. | "Do Re Mi Sol La Si Do" (off vocal ver.) | 5:05 |
| 5. | "Kitsune" (off vocal ver.) | 3:40 |
| 6. | "Yasashisa ga Jyama o Suru" (off vocal ver.) | 4:26 |
| Total length: | | 26:23 |

Blu-ray
| No. | Title | Length |
|---|---|---|
| 1. | "Do Re Mi Sol La Si Do" (music video) | 5:13 |
| 2. | "Yasashisa ga Jyama o Suru" (music video) | 4:38 |
| 3. | "Kyokō Saitō, Miku Kanemura, Manamo Miyata -I tried all the frozen food for the first time~" | 24:32 |
| 4. | "Mana Takase, Ayaka Takamoto, Akari Nibu ~I hit a home run for the first time-" | 25:04 |
| Total length: | | 59:27 |

=== Regular Edition ===
CD
| No. | Title | Length |
|---|---|---|
| 1. | "Do Re Mi Sol La Si Do" (ドレミソラシド) | 5:05 |
| 2. | "Kitsune" (キツネ) | 3:40 |
| 3. | "Dash&Rush" | 4:13 |
| 4. | "Do Re Mi Sol La Si Do off vocal ver." | 5:05 |
| 5. | "Kitsune off vocal ver." | 3:40 |
| 6. | "Dash&Rush off vocal ver." | 4:11 |
| Total length: | | 25:54 |

== Awards ==
The following table lists some of the major awards received by the group.

| Year | Ceremony | Award | Nominated work | Source | Result |
|---|---|---|---|---|---|
| 2019 | 61st Japan Record Awards | Excellent work award | Do Re Mi Sol La Si Do | | Won |

== Personnel ==
=== "Do Re Mi Sol La Si Do" ===
Center: Nao Kosaka

- 1st row: Kyōko Saitō, Akari Nibu, Nao Kosaka, Hina Kawata, Shiho Katō
- 2nd row: Manamo Miyata, Mirei Sasaki, Miku Kanemura, Mei Higashimura, Ayaka Takamoto, Miho Watanabe
- 3rd row: Kumi Sasaki, Mao Iguchi, Sarina Ushio, Suzuka Tomita, Hinano Kamimura, Mana Takase, Hiyori Hamagishi, Konoka Matsuda

=== "Kitsune" ===
Mao Iguchi, Sarina Ushio, Shiho Katō, Kyōko Saitō, Kumi Sasaki, Mirei Sasaki, Mana Takase, Ayaka Takamoto, Mei Higashimura, Miku Kanemura, Hina Kawata, Nao Kosaka, Suzuka Tomita, Akari Nibu, Hiyori Hamagishi, Konoka Matsuda, Manamo Miyata, Miho Watanabe, Hinano Kamimura

=== "My God" ===
Mei Higashimura, Miku Kanemura, Hina Kawata, Akari Nibu

=== "Cage" ===
Mei Higashimura, Miku Kanemura, Hina Kawata, Akari Nibu

=== "Yasashisa ga Jyama o Suru" ===
Center: Kumi Sasaki

Mao Iguchi, Sarina Ushio, Shiho Katō, Kyōko Saitō, Kumi Sasaki, Mirei Sasaki, Mana Takase, Ayaka Takamoto, Mei Higashimura

=== "Dash&Rush" ===
Center: Miku Kanemura

Miku Kanemura, Hina Kawata, Nao Kosaka, Suzuka Tomita, Akari Nibu, Hiyori Hamagishi, Konoka Matsuda, Manamo Miyata, Miho Watanabe, Hinano Kamimura

== Charts ==
Weekly charts

| Chart (2019) | Peak position |
|---|---|
| Japan (Japan Hot 100) | 1 |
| Japan (Oricon) | 1 |

Year-end charts

| Chart (2019) | Position |
|---|---|
| Japan (Japan Hot 100) | 33 |
| Japan (Oricon) | 10 |
