= Sotsugyō Shashin Dake ga Shitteru =

- Type A CD cover, featuring Nao Kosaka

Single by Hinatazaka46
- English title: Only the Graduation Photo Knows
- B-side: "Suzuka"; "Kodoku Tachi yo"; "Ano Ko ni Guigui"; "43-nen Machi no Croquette"; "Instead of You"; "Ashi no Koyubi o Tansu no Kaku ni Butsuketa"
- Released: January 29, 2025
- Genre: J-pop
- Label: Sony Music Entertainment Japan
- Lyricist: Yasushi Akimoto
- Producer: Yasushi Akimoto

Hinatazaka46 singles chronology
| "Zettaiteki Dairokkan" (2024) | "Sotsugyō Shashin Dake ga Shitteru" (2025) | "Love Yourself!" (2025) |

Music video
- "Sotsugyō Shashin Dake ga Shitteru" on YouTube
- "Suzuka" on YouTube
- "Ashi no Koyubi o Tansu no Kaku ni Butsuketa" on YouTube

"Sotsugyō Shashin Dake ga Shitteru" (Japanese: 卒業写真だけが知ってる; lit. 'Only the Graduation Photo Knows') is the 13th single by Japanese girl group Hinatazaka46, released on January 29, 2025, by Sony Music Entertainment Japan. It features Nao Kosaka as the center (lead performer) and is the last single featuring the group's founding members. The single debuted atop the weekly Oricon Singles Chart.

== Production and release ==
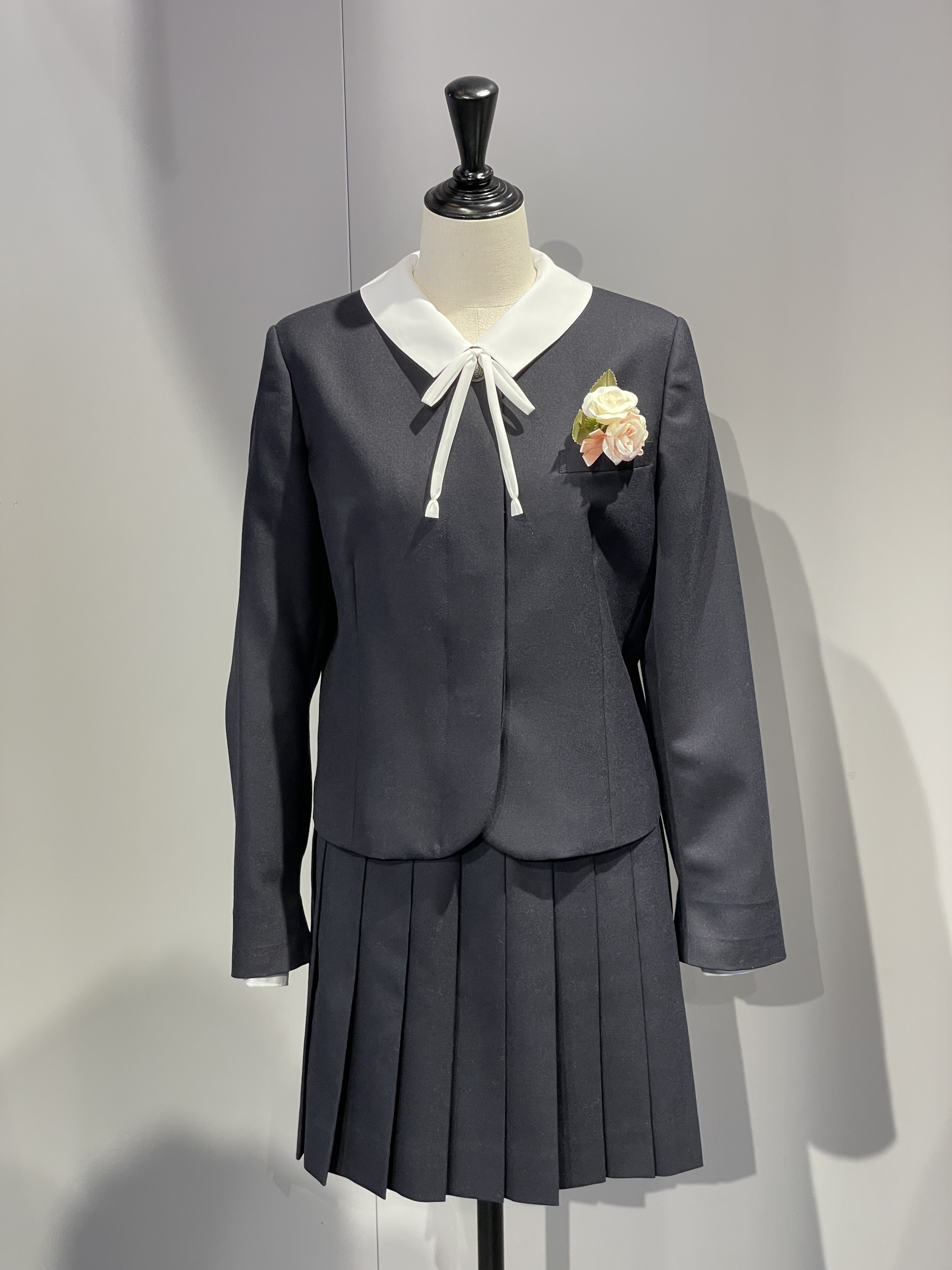
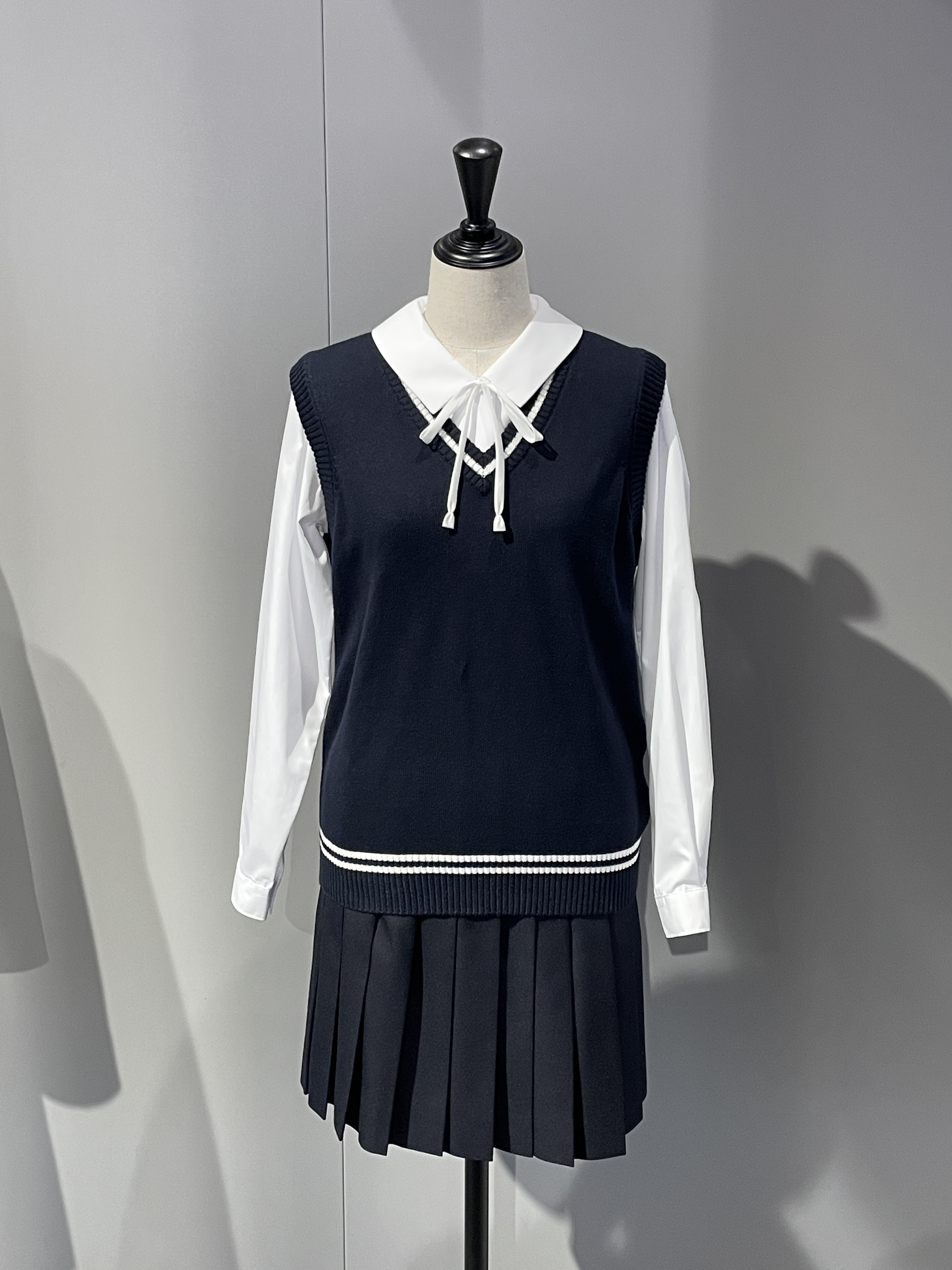
Costumes worn in the music video

As with the previous single, "Sotsugyō Shashin Dake ga Shitteru" implemented a "selection" (選抜, senbatsu) system, where only selected members would perform the title track, while unselected members would be assigned to the understudy group, Hiragana Hinatazaka46 (ひなた坂46). Second generation member Nao Kosaka returned as center (lead performer) for the first time after "Boku Nanka" (2022).

Kumi Sasaki, Mirei Sasaki, and Mana Takase, the last remaining founding members, would leave the group after the promotion of this single and performed the B-side track "Instead of You". "Suzuka", performed by Hiragana Hinatazaka46 with lyrics describing its center Suzuka Tomita, has been noted for being unusually titled after a member. "Ashi no Koyubi o Tansu no Kaku ni Butsuketa" was performed by the group's fourth generation members.

"Sotsugyō Shashin Dake ga Shitteru" was released on physical media on January 29, 2025, in five editions: four limited editions (Types A to D) featuring Blu-ray discs, and a regular CD-only edition.

== Reception ==
"Sotsugyō Shashin Dake ga Shitteru" debuted at number one on the weekly Oricon Singles Chart, selling over 428,000 physical copies in its first week. This marked Hinatazaka46's 13th consecutive number-one single since their debut, extending their record as the female artist with the most consecutive number-one singles since a debut release. The single's digital Special Edition also debuted at number one on the Oricon Weekly Digital Albums ranking.

The single's music video was highlighted for its spring-evoking visual presentation. CDJournal noted that the video's theme revolves around a "parade heralding spring", portraying nostalgic graduation day scenes and dynamic dance sequences set amidst a "blizzard" of cherry blossom.

"Suzuka" received the "Best Shocking Lyrics" and "Story Development" awards from the radio program The Trad on Tokyo FM.

== Track listing ==
1. Sotsugyō Shashin Dake ga Shitteru
2. Suzuka
3. Different tracks on each type:
  - Type A: "Kodoku Tachi yo" (孤独たちよ; lit. 'To the Lonely Ones')
  - Type B: "Ano Ko ni Guigui" (あの娘にグイグイ; lit. 'Being Pushy with That Girl')
  - Type C: "43-nen Machi no Croquette" (43年待ちのコロッケ; transl. Croquette with 43-year Waiting List)
  - Type D: Instead of You
  - Regular: "Ashi no Koyubi o Tansu no Kaku ni Butsuketa" (足の小指を箪笥の角にぶつけた; lit. 'I Stubbed My Pinky Toe on the Corner of the Dresser')
4. Sotsugyō Shashin Dake ga Shitteru (off-vocal)
5. Suzuka (off-vocal)
6. Off-vocal versions of track 3

== Personnel ==
Lineups obtained from official website.

=== "Sotsugyō Shashin Dake ga Shitteru" ===
Center: Nao Kosaka

- 1st row: Yōko Shōgenji, Nao Kosaka, Kaho Fujishima
- 2nd row: Kumi Sasaki, Miku Kanemura, Hina Kawata, Konoka Matsuda, Mirei Sasaki
- 3rd row: Sumire Miyachi, Honoka Hirao, Hinano Kamimura, Marie Morimoto, Haruyo Yamaguchi, Haruka Yamashita

=== "Suzuka" ===
Center: Suzuka Tomita

Tamaki Ishizuka, Nanami Konishi, Mitsuki Hiraoka, Rio Shimizu, Mikuni Takahashi, Mana Takase, Kirari Takeuchi, Suzuka Tomita, Rina Watanabe

=== "Kodokutachi yo" ===
Same as "Sotsugyō Shashin Dake ga Shitteru"

=== "Ano Ko ni Guigui" ===
Same as "Suzuka"

=== "43-nen Machi no Croquette" ===
All second generation members: Miku Kanemura, Hina Kawata, Nao Kosaka, Suzuka Tomita, Konoka Matsuda

=== "Instead of You" ===
All first generation members: Kumi Sasaki, Mirei Sasaki, Mana Takase

=== "Ashi no Koyubi wo Tansu no Kaku ni Butsuketa" ===
Center: Haruka Yamashita

All fourth generation members:

- 1st row: Sumire Miyachi, Haruka Yamashita, Nanami Konishi
- 2nd row: Rio Shimizu, Kirari Takeuchi, Honoka Hirao, Tamaki Ishizuka
- 3rd row: Mitsuki Hiraoka, Kaho Fujishima, Rina Watanabe, Yōko Shōgenji

== Charts ==
=== Weekly charts ===
Weekly chart performance for "Sotsugyō Shashin Dake ga Shitteru"
| Chart (2025) | Peak position |
|---|---|
| Japan (Japan Hot 100) | 6 |
| Japan (Oricon) | 1 |
| Japan Combined Singles (Oricon) | 1 |

=== Monthly charts ===
Monthly chart performance for "Sotsugyō Shashin Dake ga Shitteru"
| Chart (2025) | Position |
|---|---|
| Japan (Oricon) | 1 |

=== Year-end charts ===
Year-end chart performance for "Sotsugyō Shashin Dake ga Shitteru"
| Chart (2025) | Position |
|---|---|
| Japan (Oricon) | 16 |
