= Suzaku =

Suzaku, Su-zaku, or Su-Zaku may refer to:

- Vermilion Bird (Zhū Què), whose Japanese name is Suzaku, the bird guardian of the South and one of the Four Symbols of Chinese constellations
- Suzaku (film), a 1997 Japanese film by Naomi Kawase
- Emperor Suzaku (922–952), an emperor of Japan
- Emperor Go-Suzaku (1009–1045), an emperor of Japan
- SUZAK Inc., also known as Suzaku, a video game developer
- Suzaku Avenue, one of the ancient main streets in Kyoto and Nara, Japan
- Suzaku (satellite), the name given in 2005 to an ASTRO-EII spacecraft, a joint venture of NASA and the Japanese Space Agency JAXA

== Fictional characters ==
- Su-Zaku, an enemy in the Game Boy game The Final Fantasy Legend
- Suzaku, one of the four divine guardians in the video game Final Fantasy XI: Rise of the Zilart
- Suzaku, a character in the YuYu Hakusho series
- Suzaku, an enemy in the PlayStation game SaGa Frontier
- Suzaku, a character in Descendants of Darkness (Yami no Matsuei) who is one of Tsuzuki's shikigami, or guardian beasts
- Suzaku, a character in the game Flying Dragon
- Suzaku, the bitbeast companion of Kai Hiwatari in the Beyblade franchise
- Suzaku, an antagonist of the game Tenchu 2: Birth of the Stealth Assassins
- Suzaku, the 23rd rank in the video game Tekken Tag Tournament 2
- Suzaku, the guardian of the South Gate of the Imperial Palace in Accel World
- Suzaku, one of the guardian spirits in the video game Nioh
- Suzaku, one of the Four Lords in the video game Final Fantasy XIV: Stormblood
- Suzaku Ban, a supporting character from the anime series Shinobi no Ittoki
- Suzaku Kururugi, a main character in the anime series Code Geass: Lelouch of the Rebellion
- Ryu Suzaku, the protagonist of the anime series F-Zero: Legend of the Falcon (F-Zero GP Legend), known in English as Rick Wheeler
- Suzaku Seikun, a god-character in Fushigi Yûgi

== See also ==
- Shūsaku, a Japanese given name
- Suzuka (disambiguation)
