= Jump!! The Heroes Behind the Gold =

2021 Japanese film by Ken Iizuka

Japanese name
- Kanji: ヒノマルソウル〜舞台裏の英雄たち〜
- Literal meaning: Hinomaru Soul: The Heroes Behind The Scenes
Transcriptions
- Revised Hepburn: Hinomaru Sōru: Butaiura no Eiyū-tachi
- Directed by: Ken Iizuka
- Written by: Noriaki Sugihara; Kenichi Suzuki
- Produced by: Takashi Hirano; Yasushi Utagawa; Tamako Tsujimoto; Tetsuta Tone
- Starring: Kei Tanaka; Tao Tsuchiya; Yuki Yamada; Gordon Maeda; Nao Kosaka
- Music by: Shogo Kaida
- Production companies: Toho; TBS; et al.
- Distributed by: Toho
- Release date: 18 June 2021
- Running time: 115 minutes
- Country: Japan
- Language: Japanese
- Box office: $626,000

Jump!! The Heroes Behind the Gold (Japanese: ヒノマルソウル〜舞台裏の英雄たち〜, Hepburn: Hinomaru Sōru: Butaiura no Eiyū-tachi; lit. Hinomaru Soul: The Heroes Behind The Scenes) is a Japanese film released on 18 June 2021. It is based on a true story of the test jumpers for the ski jumping event at the 1998 Winter Olympics, who were instrumental in giving Japan a chance at winning the gold medal.

== Plot ==
Jinya Nishikata is part of Japan's Large Hill ski jumping team at the 1994 Winter Olympics in Lillehammer, Norway, which has to settle for silver medal as his teammate Masahiko Harada fails his final jump. Nishikata proceeds to train for the 1998 Winter Olympics, which will be held in his home Nagano Prefecture. However, he gets injured during training and even though he manages to complete rehabilitation before the event, he is not selected for the team, while Harada makes the cut. He instead accepts an offer to join the team of test jumpers, which includes hearing-impaired Ryuji Takahashi; Takashi Minamikawa, who also did not make the Olympics team due to injury; and high school girl Yoshiko Kobayashi, who could only participate in that capacity as the 1998 Olympics has no women's ski jumping event (the first such event would be held in 2014).

During the event, Harada again botches his first jump, and Japan falls to fourth place. A blizzard then hits the event venue, potentially preventing the second attempt to be carried out and eliminating Japan's chances of winning the gold medal. The judges decided that the event would be continued if all 25 test jumpers could successfully make their jump. Japan's hopes of winning the gold medal is placed entirely in the hands of the test jumpers.

== Cast ==
- Kei Tanaka as Jinya Nishikata
- Tao Tsuchiya as Yukie Nishikata, Jinya's wife
- Yuki Yamada as Ryuji Takahashi
- Gordon Maeda as Takashi Minamikawa
- Nao Kosaka as Yoshiko Kobayashi (based on Yoshiko Kasai)
- Motoki Ochiai as Noriaki Kasai
- Takayuki Hamatsu as Masahiko Harada
- Arata Furuta as Koichi Kanzaki, the Japan team's coach
- Kento Kano as Kazuyoshi Funaki
- Toma Kato as Shingo Nishikata, the Nishikatas' son

== Production and release ==
The 1998 Nagano story is one that is retold before every subsequent Winter Olympics in Japan and had inspired ski jumpers such as Sara Takanashi and Ryōyū Kobayashi.

Hakuba Ski Jumping Stadium

Jump!! The Heroes Behind The Gold was first announced in November 2019, with Kei Tanaka as lead actor. Yuki Yamada's appearance was announced in January 2020, while those of Gordon Maeda, Nao Kosaka, Takayuki Hamatsu, Motoki Ochiai, and Arata Furuta were announced in February and Tao Tsuchiya in March. Principal photography took place from January to February 2020 at the actual Olympics venue in the village of Hakuba, Nagano Prefecture, including the 140-meter tall jumping platform at the Hakuba Ski Jumping Stadium.

Jinya Nishikata positively commented on Tanaka's portrayal of him, particularly noting the scene where his character wishes for Harada to fall, as at the time he had indeed hoped that his rival did not make a long jump. Yamada revealed that he had never skied before the film's production, and director Ken Iizuka revealed that Yamada was his first choice for the challenging role. Kosaka drew from her experience as a substitute player in her middle school volleyball club and noted that the film shows that people can shine in life even in support roles.

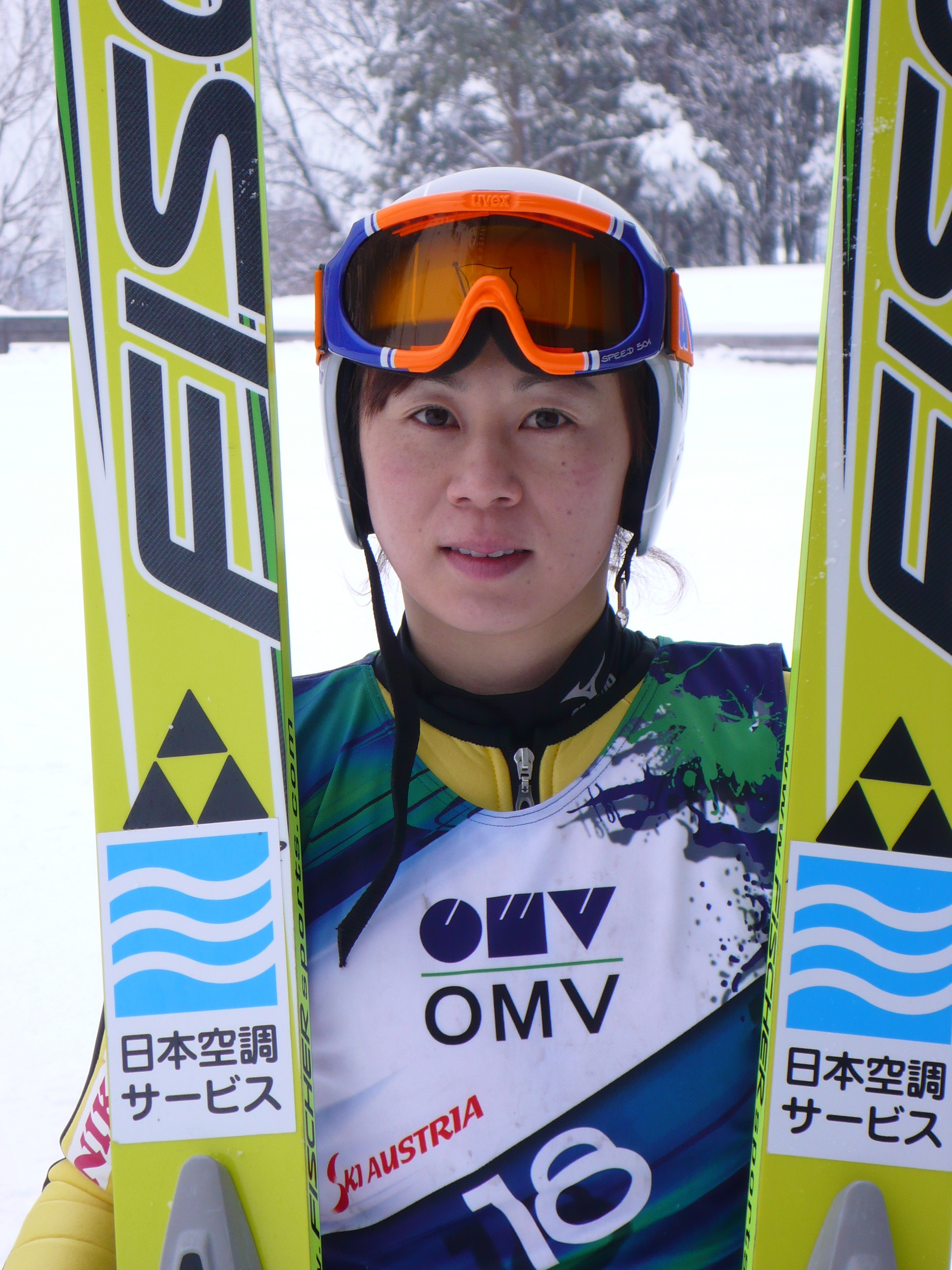
Yoshiko Yoshiizumi in 2010

To promote the film, Yamada and Nishikata appeared as guests at the 2020 HBC Cup Jump. Kosaka appeared as a special guest at the 2021 HBC Cup Jump, where Yoshiko Yoshiizumi (née Kasai) also appeared as a guest. Masahiko Harada served as commentator for both events.

The theme song of Jump!! is "Omoiharaharato" by Misia, with lyrics by Enon Kawatani and arrangement by Keiichi Tomita. It also features "Perfect Clarity" by Man with a Mission.

Originally planned for June 2020, the film's theatrical release was postponed twice due to the COVID-19 pandemic in Japan, and it finally premiered on 18 June 2021. The home media (Blu-ray and DVD) was released on 3 December 2021.

== Reception ==
The film was the ninth most-watched film in its opening weekend, according to cinema survey company Kogyo Tsushinsha. It also earned the highest average user rating on Filmarks for films released that weekend, with 3.99 stars from 315 user reviews.

Cinemarche commented that the film depicts an inspiring story and reminds the viewer that there are many unknown human dramas behind the glory of the Olympics.

=== Accolades ===
Award	Category	Recipient(s)	Result	Refs
76th Mainichi Film Awards	Tsutaya Movie Fan Award 2021	Jump!! The Heroes Behind the Gold	3rd place	
46th Hochi Film Award	Supporting Actor Award	Yuki Yamada	Won	
46th Hochi Film Award	Best New Artist	Gordon Maeda	Nominated	
34th Nikkan Sports Film Award	Yūjirō Ishihara Newcomer Award	Gordon Maeda	Won	
31st Yubari International Fantastic Film Festival	New Wave Award	Gordon Maeda	Won	
64th Blue Ribbon Awards	Best Newcomer	Gordon Maeda	Nominated	
