= Koeharu! =

2021 Japanese television series

- 声春っ!
- Developed by: Yasushi Akimoto
- Screenplay by: Erika Yoshida
- Directed by: Takehiko Shinjō; Ryō Nishimura
- Starring: Hinatazaka46
- Opening theme: "Koe no Ashiato"
- Ending theme: "Koe no Ashiato"
- Composer: Tarō Makido
- Country of origin: Japan
- No. of episodes: 10

Production
- Producers: Kazue San'nōmaru; Tetsu Motegi; Yūka Fukusawa; Yūto Nagashio
- Running time: 30 minutes
- Production company: AOI Pro.

Original release
- Network: Nippon TV
- Release: 29 April – 1 July 2021

Related
- Dasada (TV series)

Koeharu! (声春っ!) is a Japanese television series starring members of the idol group Hinatazaka46. The show follows the daily lives of students at a voice acting school. The show aired on Nippon TV at 1:00 AM to 1:30 AM on Thursdays, and was available on Hulu Japan after it finished airing. The series is the third television series to feature Hinatazaka46, after Re:Mind and Dasada, but Koeharu! is the first to not include every member.

== Premise ==
Meiko Hinowa (Mirei Sasaki) decides to enroll in a voice acting school named Kirameki Academy to audition for a role in her favorite manga series that is about to be adapted into an anime. She befriends people at her dormitory and school as they all work towards their dream roles.

== Cast ==
=== Hinatazaka46 ===
- Mirei Sasaki as Meiko Hinowa (日ノ輪めいこ), soft-spoken and introverted student that's inspired to become a voice actor due to Enjō Kinakuji's manga work.
- Akari Nibu as Mana Tendō (天道まな), student at the academy and self-proclaimed Meiko's rival.
- Miho Watanabe as Amagasaki Amane (尼崎あまね), student at the academy. Attended the same high school as Meiko.
- Miku Kanemura as Yukina Tsukikawa (月川雪菜), older student at the academy. Aspires to be an idol.
- Hina Kawata as Tae Honda (本田多恵), student at the academy and admires Yukina.
- Hinano Kamimura as Airi Kusama (草間愛理), student at the academy. Looks up to Meiko as a mentor.
- Ayaka Takamoto as Chizue Harukaze (春風ちずえ), former student and dorm mother.
- Konoka Matsuda as Mari Koshino (越野まり), Chizue's classmate and part of the idol duo "Maririn & Ruby"
- Sarina Ushio as the voice of Luna (るーな), the narrator and the character on Meiko's handkerchief. Also appears as herself in the final episode.

=== Others ===
- Kōichi Yamadera as Genmai Odawara (大俵玄米), headmaster at the academy
- Aya Hirano as Iwao (岩尾), instructor at the academy
- Naoto Takenaka as Enjō Kinakuji (金閣寺炎上), manga artist
- Keiko Toda as Meiko's grandmother
- Rica Matsumoto as herself (guest star, episode 5)

== Episodes ==
No.	Title	Original release date
1	"夢の形"; Transliteration: "Yume no Katachi"	April 29, 2021
Inspired to become the voice actor in the upcoming anime Namidairo Senki, Meiko attends Kirameki Academy to learn voice acting. At the first day of school, Meiko befriends the cheerful Mana, who happens to live in the same dormitory as her. Meiko finds out that a girl that has been mean to her since high school, Amane, is also in her class. Meiko also meets her dorm mother, Chizue, and her fellow roommates in her dormitory: Yukina, Tae, and Airi.
2	"好敵手未満"; Transliteration: "Kōtekishu Miman"	May 6, 2021
A questionnaire is given to the class asking about each student's perceived strengths. Meiko and Mana both struggle to find an answer, and it is revealed that Mana used to be a proficient kendo athlete before an injury ended her career. Mana declares that she and Meiko are rivals.
3	"外見と中身"; Transliteration: "Gaiken to Nakami"	May 13, 2021
Airi decides to make Meiko her role model since they both have trouble expressing themselves. Airi is scouted by a modeling agency, but is unhappy about it because she does not want to be judged by her looks alone. Airi does take the job, but still remains as a student in Kirameki Academy.
4	"憧れと嫉妬"; Transliteration: "Akogare to Shitto"	May 20, 2021
Meiko and her friends attend an audition for a sister group of the idol duo "Maririn & Ruby". Yukina, who aspires to be an idol, really wants to be selected, but Tae is chosen instead. Yukina and Tae argue as Tae moves out of the dormitory. Tae debuts as part of Chocola Chocola and later reconciles with Yukina.
5	"諦めが肝心"; Transliteration: "Akirame ga Kanjin"	May 27, 2021
A year passes, and the students think about what to do after they graduate. Chizue struggles to find a voice acting role. Meiko's grandmother falls over and is sent to the hospital, so Meiko rushes to the hospital to find that her grandmother is fine and has a new boyfriend. Amane contemplates quitting and taking her family ryokan business, but Meiko persuades her not to. Chizue decides to quit being a dorm mother to focus on voice acting.
6	"卒業"; Transliteration: "Sotsugyō"	June 3, 2021
Meiko learns that the anime for Namidairo Senki is cancelled. She meets Masami Tanabe, an art student working on an anime project, and decides to get her friends to voice his project. While Meiko becomes more and more involved in Masami's project, Masami assigns Meiko a minor character, which angers Meiko. Meiko learns that is the only person in her friend group that was not signed to a voice acting agency and runs away.
7	"挫折の先に"; Transliteration: "Zusetsu no Saki ni"	June 10, 2021
Meiko is working as a janitor when she learns that Genmai, the headmaster, has passed away. At his memorial service, Meiko reunites with her friends. Together, they voice Masami's unfinished anime project.
8	"選ばれたい"; Transliteration: "Erabaretai"	June 17, 2021
Everyone except Yukina and Airi are invited by Enjō to an audition for the main protagonist of Namidairo Senki, and they also agree to appear in a documentary directed by Kaki-P to document their audition process. In a prerecorded video, Genmai asks Yukina and Airi to promote the anime. Tae decides to not participate in the audition to focus on being an idol in Chocola Chocola. The remaining friends pass the first round of the audition.
9	"選ばれない"; Transliteration: "Erabarenai"	June 24, 2021
In the second round of the audition, Meiko finds herself up against the multitalented Maririn, who Enjō is a fan of. In the end, Meiko, Mana, and Maririn are selected to move to the final round, while Chizue is chosen for a minor character. Amane is determined to try harder at other auditions.
10	"声春っ!"; Transliteration: "Koeharu!"	July 1, 2021
Kaki-P inadvertently reveals that Maririn was chosen for the role before the final round of auditions, but Meiko is still determined to participate. During the final round, Mana and Maririn promote themselves, while Meiko decides to withdraw because she believes the others are better suited for the role. Mana ends up with the role, but Maririn and Meiko are still chosen for other characters.

== Production ==
The series was announced on March 27, 2021 during the second day of Hinatazaka46's 2nd anniversary concert.

Koeharu aired on Nippon TV between April 29 and July 1, 2021, and was available on Hulu Japan after its broadcast. An accompanying talk show was also included on Hulu where Sarina Ushio, the narrator of the series, interviewed other Hinatazaka46 cast members.

=== Soundtrack ===
The opening and closing theme song, "Koe no Ashiato", is included in Hinatazaka46's single "Kimi Shika Katan". In the storyline, there are also two musical groups who each record a song in the series' soundtrack: "Röntgen Megane" (レントゲン眼鏡) by Maririn & Ruby (Konoka Matsuda and Suzuka Tomita), and "Hell Rose" by Chocola Shocola (Hina Kawata, Hiyori Hamagishi, and Mei Higashimura).
