= Re:Mind =

Japanese psychological thriller

- Genre: Psychological thriller
- Starring: Members from Hiragana Keyakizaka46
- Music by: Taro Makito
- Opening theme: "Soredemo Aruiteru"
- Country of origin: Japan
- Original language: Japanese
- No. of seasons: 1
- No. of episodes: 13

Production
- Producers: Akira Uchikata, Yusuke Ishida, Yusuke Koroyasu
- Running time: 30 minutes
- Production company: TV Tokyo

Original release
- Network: Netflix
- Release: October 13, 2017

Re:Mind is a Japanese psychological thriller television series, which was released on Netflix on October 13, 2017, and also broadcast on TV Tokyo starting October 19. The series was produced by Akira Uchikata, Yusuke Ishida, and Yusuke Koroyasu, and features cast members from the Japanese idol girl group Hiragana Keyakizaka46 (now Hinatazaka46).

== Plot ==
After awaking in an old European-style room, eleven high school classmates find themselves sitting at a large dining room table, with their feet shackled to the floor. They find that their situation could be related to another classmate named Miho who had disappeared months before. As they try to figure out how to escape, some of the girls start disappearing from the table one by one. The girls realize they each share a checkered past with Miho, but also suspect one of them could be behind the trap.

== Cast ==
The main characters are played by the first generation members (except Miho Watanabe) of the Japanese idol group Hiragana Keyakizaka46. They go by their real given names:

- Mirei Sasaki
- Sarina Ushio
- Mei Higashimura
- Ayaka Takamoto
- Kyōko Saitō
- Kumi Sasaki
- Shiho Katō
- Yūka Kageyama
- Mao Iguchi
- Mana Takase
- Memi Kakizaki
- Miho Watanabe

Ichirōta Miyakawa portrayed their former teacher, Mr. Hayashi.

== Production ==
Re:Mind is produced by Tokyo TV and Netflix.

Neru Nagahama was originally planned to appear, but she left Hiragana Keyakizaka46 in September 2017. An audition was held among the second generation members, who recently joined the group in August, and Miho Watanabe was selected to replace Nagahama in her role. The last episode, titled "Re:Wind", is a special flashback episode depicting the main characters' relationships before the events of the main story; Nao Kosaka portrayed the main character of the episode, while the rest of the second generation members appeared as background characters, all named after themselves.

=== Staff ===
- Planning - Original - Yasushi Akimoto
- Screenplay - Yoshimichi Murooka, Hirofumi Tanaka, Daisuke Hosaka
- Music - Taro Makito
- Theme Song - "Soredemo Aruiteru" (それでも歩いてる; "Keep Walking Anyway") by Hiragana Keyakizaka46
- Producer - Kentaro Yamato, Satoshi Egawa, Toshiya Nomura
- Co-Producer - Nakadake Take
- Associate Producer - Fumiaki Kobayashi
- Contents Producer - Naofumi Takiyama, Yuzo Kikuma
- Director - Akira Uchikata, Yusuke Ishida, Goroyasu YuRyo, Tsuyoshi Furukawa
- Production - TV TOKYO, Netflix
- Production work - "Re: Mind" Production Committee

== Reception ==
Kirsten Howard of Den of Geek said "Re:Mind is sweet, sweet binge fodder for mystery junkies".
