= Tsuzuki =

Tsuzuki may refer to:

== Places ==
- Tsuzuki-ku, Yokohama
- Tsuzuki District, Kyoto

== People with the surname ==
- Ryota Tsuzuki, footballer
- Tsuzuki Yoneko, go player

== See also ==
- Suzuki (disambiguation)
