= Suzuka Tomita =

Japanese actress and media personality (born 2001)

- 富田 鈴花
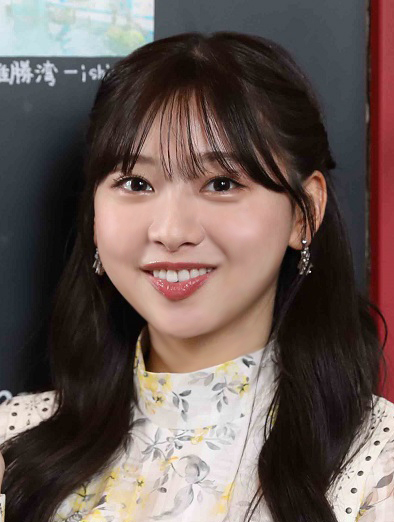
- Tomita in 2024
- Born: January 18, 2001 (age 25); Kanagawa Prefecture, Japan
- Occupations: Actress; media personality
- Years active: 2017–present
- Agent: Trustar
- Height: 165 cm (5 ft 5 in)
- Musical career
- Instruments: Vocals; guitar; bass guitar; piano
- Years active: 2017–2025
- Formerly of: Hinatazaka46
- Website: Official website

Suzuka Tomita (Japanese: 富田鈴花, Hepburn: Tomita Suzuka; born January 18, 2001) is a Japanese actress and media personality. She starred as Hong Cha-young in the first stage adaptation of Vincenzo (2023) and as June in Gypsy (2026). She was also highly involved with Super Formula Championship promotions and held the titles of Super Formula PR Ambassador and Abema Motorsport Ambassador.

Tomita was a member of the girl group Hinatazaka46 (formerly Hiragana Keyakizaka46) from 2017 to 2025. Aside from appearing in the group's concerts, she held a duo concert in 2021 and solo concert in 2025, and played supporting roles in the group's television dramas Dasada (2020) and Koeharu! (2021). Her television work outside the group began with a brief period as co-host of the morning show Love It! in 2022, followed by hosting Super Formula variety shows from 2022 to 2025. She departed from Hinatazaka46 in August 2025, before which she released her first photobook. After a few months of career break, she joined the talent agency Trustar to pursue an acting career.

== Early life ==
Tomita hails from Kanagawa Prefecture and has two older brothers. She was named after the Suzuka Circuit race track in Mie Prefecture, as her mother was a Formula One fan.

Tomita plays the guitar, bass guitar, and piano. Before transferring high schools following her entry into Hiragana Keyakizaka46, she had been classmates with actress and fashion model Miu Suzuki.

== Career ==
=== 2017–2021: Early career, Hana-chans ===
Tomita successfully passed the auditions for the second generation of Hiragana Keyakizaka46, now Hinatazaka46, on August 13, 2017, and was publicly introduced two days later. She made her musical debut with "No War in the Future", included on their parent group Keyakizaka46's fifth single, "Kaze ni Fukarete mo" (2017). In her early variety show appearances, she adopted a comedic "party animal" (パリピ, paripi) persona and she has performed rapping on variety shows and several of the group's concerts. In August 2018, she appeared in the group's stage adaptation of the mobile game Magia Record, playing Yui Tsuruno.

Tomita formed the acoustic guitar and vocal duo Hana-chans (花ちゃんズ, Hanachanzu) with fellow second-generation member Konoka Matsuda. The duo recorded the song "Masaka Gūzen..." (まさか 偶然...; lit. 'Such a Coincidence...'), included on Hinatazaka46's third single, "Konna ni Suki ni Natchatte Ii no?" (2019). The duo's concert, produced by MTV Japan, was titled MTV Acoustic Flowers: "Bell & Like" (Note: "Bell" (鈴, suzu) and "like" (好, konomu) are direct translations of the first kanji characters of their given names.) and held as a live-stream event on June 27, 2021. She also portrayed supporting characters in Hinatazaka46 productions: Nanao Hataya in Dasada (2020) and Rubie in Koeharu! (2021).

=== 2022–2025: Acting and motorsport ventures ===
From April to June 2022, Tomita served as a regular Wednesday co-host on the TBS morning show Love it!. Leveraging the origin of her name, she diversified into motorsport and automotive-related media. In July 2022, she became the main host for the Super Formula Championship racing variety show Go On! Next Circuit de Aimashō (GO ON！ NEXT〜サーキットで会いましょう〜; lit. 'Go On! Let's Meet at the Next Circuit', a reference to the variety show Hinatazaka de Aimashō) on BS Fuji, which migrated to Abema under the title Circuit de Aimashō (サーキットで会いましょう; lit. 'Let's Meet at the Circuit') in April 2023. She was appointed Super Formula PR Ambassador in 2023 and Abema Motorsport Ambassador in 2024. In 2023, she became the first active Japanese idol to sing the Japanese national anthem solo to open the Super Formula round held at the Suzuka Circuit; she reprised the role in 2025. Outside motorsport, she appeared in public service announcements for the Shuto Expressway renewal project in late 2022 and became a brand ambassador for Panasonic's Caos car battery line in 2024. Her video series on the group's Hinatazaka Channel about her journey to purchase her first car also became one of the channel's most popular content; the video released on her 23rd birthday reveals that she has purchased a Suzuki Jimny Sierra.

On May 6, 2022, the YouTube channel The First Take released a video of Tomita performing "Do Re Mi Sol La Si Do" with first-generation Hinatazaka46 members Shiho Katō, Kumi Sasaki, and Mirei Sasaki.

In August 2023, Tomita secured her first major theatrical role outside Hinatazaka46, starring as the female lead Hong Cha-young in the first ever musical stage adaptation of the 2021 Korean television drama Vincenzo, which toured Kobe, Tokyo, and Osaka. She served as the center (lead performer) for the song titled after and describing herself, "Suzuka", released on the group's 13th single, "Sotsugyō Shashin Dake ga Shitteru" (2025).

Tomita has been a recurring contestant on the Fuji Television game show Chidori no Oni Renchan since 2021, where she sang karaoke songs of increasing difficulty, judged solely by machine pitch detection. She won the grand prizes of 1 million yen in March 2024 and January 2025, the second time in a duo "tag team" with fellow Hinatazaka46 member Mikuni Takahashi.

On May 3, 2025, Tomita announced her upcoming graduation from Hinatazaka46. She held her "graduation" ceremony during a live-streamed mini-concert on June 27, 2025. In July, MTV Japan produced a solo concert titled Suzuka Tomita (Hinatazaka46) One Last Live on MTV at the Tachikawa Stage Garden, which also featured Konoka Matsuda as guest.

Tomita's first solo photobook, titled Suzuka Circuit (鈴花サーキット), (Note: Written with the kanji characters of her name instead of those of the actual circuit (鈴鹿サーキット).) was published by Kobunsha on August 5, 2025. With the theme of "road movie", the book chronicled her drive along the east coast of Queensland, Australia, where her parents had gone for their honeymoon, starting from Gold Coast, through landmarks such as the 75 Mile Beach in K'gari and the historic city of Gympie, and ending at Lake McKenzie. She obtained an International Driving Permit specifically for the shoot and provided her own handwriting for the title print on the cover. The book sold 27 thousand copies in its release week and topped the week's Oricon photobook chart. She officially concluded her activities with Hinatazaka46 on the same day as the book's release.

=== 2026–present: Solo career ===
Tomita appeared on Chidori no Oni Renchan for the first time as a solo talent in March 2026, where she remarked on her significantly reduced income after leaving Hinatazaka46. The public reaction to the revelation led to her clarification in an April interview that she was "completely fine" and should have been "more careful" with her words. She would later reveal that she had traded in her Suzuki Jimny for a Mini Cooper S in January.

On April 1, 2026, Tomita announced that she had signed with the talent agency Trustar to pursue a career as an actress and media personality. Shortly after, she was appointed as the official ambassador for the "TIF de Debut 2026" idol audition campaign, held in conjunction with the Tokyo Idol Festival.

In May and June 2026, Tomita portrayed June (Dainty June) in a production of the classic musical Gypsy, directed by English director Christopher Luscombe. The play was performed in Tokyo, Kariya in Aichi Prefecture, Fukuoka, and Osaka. She appeared in Squall, a television drama on ABC Television commemorating the 60th anniversary of diplomatic relations between Japan and Singapore and the first Japanese drama series filmed primarily on location in Singapore.

Tomita has been scheduled to hold her first concert as a soloist on December 20, 2026 at the Shintoshi Hall in Yokohama, billed Suzuka Tomita Winter Live 2026 "Bell Note".

== Personal life ==
Tomita enjoys driving and horseback riding. She owns a cat named Senang, after the Indonesian word for "happy".

== Discography ==
Tomita's prominent appearances in Hinatazaka46 discography include:

- "Masaka Gūzen..." (まさか 偶然...; lit. 'Such a Coincidence...') (2019, released with "Konna ni Suki ni Natchatte Ii no?"), as Hana-chans
- "Sonota Ōzei Type" (その他大勢タイプ; transl. The Regular Guy Type) (2022, released with "Tsuki to Hoshi ga Odoru Midnight"), with Yūka Kageyama, Miku Kanemura, and Hinano Kamimura
- "Suzuka" (2025, released with "Sotsugyō Shashin Dake ga Shitteru"), center (lead performer)

=== Television original ===
- "Röntgen Megane" (レントゲン眼鏡; lit. 'X-ray Glasses') (2021), Koeharu! original song, performed with Konoka Matsuda as the in-universe duo Maririn and Rubie

== Filmography ==
=== Television ===
==== Talk and variety shows ====
Year	Title	Role	Notes	Ref.
2021–2026	Chidori no Oni Renchan	Recurring contestant	Won grand prizes in March 2024 and January 2025	
2022	Love It!	Multiple	Wednesday co-host, April–June	
2022	Go On! Next Circuit de Aimashō	Host		
2023–2025	Circuit de Aimashō	Host		

==== Dramas ====
Year	Title	Role	Notes	Ref.
2020	Dasada	Nanao Hataya		
2021	Koeharu!	Rubie		
2024	Yonimo Kimyogana Monogatari '24 Natsu no Tokubetsu-hen	Airi		
2026	Squall	Natsume		

=== Web series ===
Web series
- Hinakoi Films playlist on YouTube
- "An Awkward Interview with a Powerhouse School" on YouTube

Year	Title	Role	Notes	Ref.
2021	Deadly School Trip (死幽学旅行, Shiyūgakuryokō)	Nanami		
2021	Hinakoi Films: You and Me, Hinata's First Love — Cultural Festival Magic Strikes Unexpectedly	Suzuka	Lead role	
2025	AimaiMe "An Awkward Interview with a Powerhouse School"	Reporter	Vol. 39; 2025 World Table Tennis Championships tie-in	

== Theater ==
Year	Title	Role	Venue(s)	Notes	Ref.
2018	Ayumi	Multiple	AiiA 2.5 Theater Tokyo		
2018	Magia Record	Yui Tsuruno	Akasaka ACT Theater (Tokyo)	Main cast	
2023	Vincenzo	Hong Cha-young	AiiA 2.5 Theater Kobe (Hyogo); Nippon Seinenkan (Tokyo); Sankei Hall Breezé (Osaka)	Female lead	
2026	Gypsy	June (Dainty June)	Nippon Seinenkan (Tokyo); Kariya Cultural Center Iris (Aichi); Fukuoka Canal City Theater (Fukuoka); Morinomiya Piloti Hall (Osaka)		
2026	Almond	Dora	EX Theater Ariake (Tokyo); Orix Theater (Osaka)		

== Bibliography ==
- Suzuka Circuit (鈴花サーキット) (2025, photobook), Kobunsha, ISBN 4334107206

== Radio ==
- Lawson presents Hinatazaka46's Hotto Hitoiki! (ローソン presents 日向坂46のほっとひといき!) (2023–2025, Tokyo FM), host (rotating with other Hinatazaka46 members)
