= Suzuka (beetle) =

Scientific classification
- Domain: Eukaryota
- Kingdom: Animalia
- Phylum: Arthropoda
- Class: Insecta
- Order: Coleoptera
- Suborder: Adephaga
- Family: Carabidae
- Subfamily: Trechinae
- Tribe: Trechini
- Subtribe: Trechina
- Genus: Suzuka; Ueno, 1956

Genus of beetles

Suzuka is a genus of ground beetles in the family Carabidae. There are at least three described species in Suzuka, found in Japan.

== Species ==
These three species belong to the genus Suzuka:

- Suzuka kobayashii (Ueno, 1956)
- Suzuka masuzoi Ueno, 1989
- Suzuka morii Ueno & Kitayama, 2005
