= Suzuki (disambiguation) =

Suzuki is a Japanese vehicle manufacturer.

Suzuki may also refer to:

- Suzuki (surname), a Japanese surname
- Suzuki Musical Instrument Corporation, a Japanese musical instrument manufacturer
- Suzuki & Company, a former Japanese trading firm
- Suzuki (album), an album by Tosca
- "Suzuki" (song), a song by Fuerza Regida
- Suzuki (fish) (also Japanese sea bass), a fish of the family Lateolabracidae
- Suzuki reaction, a cross-coupling chemical reaction
- Suzuki sporadic group, in group theory
- Suzuki method, a method of music teaching
- Suzuki method (actor training), a method of actor training
- The Mooney Suzuki, an American rock band

== See also ==
- Tsuzuki (disambiguation)
- Suzuka (disambiguation)
