= Nikkei Business Publications =

Japanese book and magazine publisher

- Parent company: Nihon Keizai Shimbun
- Founded: 1969; 57 years ago (as Nikkei McGraw-Hill, Inc.); Chiyoda, Tokyo, Japan
- Revenue: JPY 36.8 billion (2018)
- No. of employees: 765 (2018)
- Official website: nikkeibp.com

Nikkei Business Publications, Inc. (株式会社日経BP, Kabushiki-gaisha Nikkei Bī Pī), commonly known as Nikkei BP (日経BP社, Nikkei Bī Pī sha), is a book and magazine publisher based in Tokyo, Japan. The company was established as "Nikkei McGraw-Hill, Inc." (日経マグロウヒル株式会社), a joint venture of Nihon Keizai Shimbun (Nikkei) and McGraw-Hill in 1969, and it became a wholly owned subsidiary of Nikkei in 1988.

Nikkei BP is known well for its various magazines on segmentalized business and technology fields, and a direct-sales system of the magazines.

== Major magazines and websites ==
- Nikkei Business (日経ビジネス), a weekly business magazine founded as a sister magazine of Business Week in 1969, website in English and Japanese.
- Nikkei Electronics (日経エレクトロニクス), a semimonthly electronics industry magazine founded as a sister magazine of Electronics in 1971.
- Nikkei Computer (日経コンピュータ), a semimonthly enterprise computing magazine published since 1981.
- Nikkei Personal Computing (日経パソコン), a semimonthly personal computer magazine published since 1983, website in Japanese.
- Nikkei Byte (日経バイト), a monthly leading computer magazine founded as a sister magazine of Byte in 1984, and was ceased in 2005.
- National Geographic Japan edition (ナショナル ジオグラフィック日本版), a Japanese local edition of National Geographic published by Nikkei National Geographic Inc. (株式会社日経ナショナルジオグラフィック社), a joint venture of Nikkei BP and National Geographic Society, website in Japanese.
- nikkeibp.jp, an integrated business and technology news website in Japanese.

=== Talent Power Ranking ===
The Nikkei Entertainment! (日経エンタテインメント！) magazine has published the annual Talent Power Ranking (タレントパワーランキング) since 2008, based on surveys conducted by the research company Architect, Inc. to measure the public recognition of and interest in Japan's entertainers.
