= Kaze ni Fukarete mo =

- Regular edition cover. Each version A, B, C, and D has separate cover artwork.

Single by Keyakizaka46

from the album Eien Yori Nagai Isshun: Ano Koro, Tashika ni Sonzaishita Watashitachi
- Released: October 25, 2017
- Genre: J-pop
- Length: 3:41
- Label: Sony Music Records
- Composer(s): Shiraishi
- Lyricist(s): Yasushi Akimoto

Keyakizaka46 singles chronology
"Fukyōwaon" (2017)	"Kaze ni Fukarete mo" (2017)	"Glass wo Ware!" (2018)

Music video
- "Kaze ni Fukarete mo" "Kaze ni Fukarete mo" (Vevo) on YouTube

"Kaze ni Fukarete mo" (風に吹かれても, Even If Blown by the Wind) is the fifth single by Japanese girl group Keyakizaka46. It was released on October 25, 2017, by Sony Music Japan.

== Track listing ==
All lyrics written by Yasushi Akimoto.

Type A
No.	Title	Music	Arrangement	Length
1.	"Kaze ni Fukarete mo"	Shiraishi	Shiraishi	3:41
2.	"Soredemo Aruiteru"	Saito	Saito	4:11
3.	"Kekkyoku, Jaa ne Shika Ienai" (結局、じゃあねしか言えない, Goninbayashi unit song)	Hiroyuki Himeno	Himeno	4:40
4.	"Kaze ni Fukarete mo" (instrumental)	Shiraishi	Shiraishi	3:41
5.	"Soredemo Aruiteru" (instrumental)	Saito	Saito	4:11
6.	"Kekkyoku, Jaa ne Shika Ienai" (instrumental)	Himeno	Himeno	4:39
Total length:				25:03

Type B
No.	Title	Music	Arrangement	Length
1.	"Kaze ni Fukarete mo"	Shiraishi	Shiraishi	3:41
2.	"Soredemo Aruiteru"	Saito	Saito	4:11
3.	"No War in the Future" (Hiragana Keyakizaka46 group song)	Tadashi Tsukida	Tsukida	4:34
4.	"Kaze ni Fukarete mo" (instrumental)	Shiraishi	Shiraishi	3:41
5.	"Soredemo Aruiteru" (instrumental)	Saito	Saito	4:11
6.	"No War in the Future" (instrumental)	Tsukida	Tsukida	4:32
Total length:				24:50

Type C
No.	Title	Music	Arrangement	Length
1.	"Kaze ni Fukarete mo"	Shiraishi	Shiraishi	3:41
2.	"Soredemo Aruiteru"	Saito	Saito	4:11
3.	"Hiraishin" (避雷針)	Nazca	Yuichi "Masa" Nonaka	4:05
4.	"Kaze ni Fukarete mo" (instrumental)	Shiraishi	Shiraishi	3:41
5.	"Soredemo Aruiteru" (instrumental)	Saito	Saito	4:11
6.	"Hiraishin" (instrumental)	Nazca	Nonaka	4:03
Total length:				23:52

Type D
No.	Title	Music	Arrangement	Length
1.	"Kaze ni Fukarete mo"	Shiraishi	Shiraishi	3:41
2.	"Soredemo Aruiteru"	Saito	Saito	4:11
3.	"Namiuchigiwa o Hashiranai ka?" (波打ち際を走らないか?, Aozora to Marry unit song)	Yasuo Sakai	Yusuke Itagaki	4:21
4.	"Kaze ni Fukarete mo" (instrumental)	Shiraishi	Shiraishi	3:41
5.	"Soredemo Aruiteru" (instrumental)	Saito	Saito	4:11
6.	"Namiuchigiwa o Hashiranai ka?" (instrumental)	Sakai	Itagaki	4:19
Total length:				24:24

Regular Edition
No.	Title	Music	Arrangement	Length
1.	"Kaze ni Fukarete mo" (風に吹かれても)	Satori Shiraishi	Shiraishi	3:41
2.	"Soredemo Aruiteru" (それでも歩いてる)	Kuniaki Saito	Saito	4:11
3.	"Saisei Suru Saibō" (再生する細胞, Yui Imaizumi solo)	Makoto Watanabe	Watanabe	4:21
4.	"Kaze ni Fukarete mo" (instrumental)	Shiraishi	Shiraishi	3:41
5.	"Soredemo Aruiteru" (instrumental)	Saito	Saito	4:11
6.	"Saisei Suru Saibō" (instrumental)	Watanabe	Watanabe	4:20
Total length:				24:25

== Charts ==
=== Weekly charts ===
Chart (2017)	Peak position
Japan (Oricon)	1
Japan Hot 100 (Billboard)	1

=== Year-end charts ===
Chart (2017)	Position
Japan (Oricon)	9
Japan Hot 100 (Billboard)	17

Chart (2018)	Position
Japan (Oricon)	62
Japan Hot 100 (Billboard)	37

== Certifications ==
Region	Certification	Certified units/sales
Japan (RIAJ) Physical	3× Platinum	750,000^{^}
Japan (RIAJ) Digital	Gold	100,000^{*}
Japan (RIAJ) Streaming	Silver	30,000,000^{†}
^{*} Sales figures based on certification alone.^{^} Shipments figures based on certification alone.^{†} Streaming-only figures based on certification alone.
