= Hinano Kamimura =

- 上村 ひなの
- Kamimura in May 2026
- Born: April 12, 2004 (age 22); Tokyo, Japan
- Occupations: singer; actress; television personality
- Years active: 2018–present
- Musical career
- Label: Sony
- Member of: Hinatazaka46
- Website: Official website

Hinano Kamimura (Japanese: 上村 ひなの, Hepburn: Kamimura Hinano; born April 12, 2004) is a Japanese singer, actress, and television personality. She is a member of the girl group Hinatazaka46 (formerly Hiragana Keyakizaka46).

Kamimura has been the lead performer of Hinatazaka46's 10th single, "Am I Ready?" (2023), and starred in the live-action adaptation of the anime Do It Yourself!! (2023).

== Career ==
Kamimura had wanted to become an idol due to her admiration of Miho Watanabe. On August 19, 2018, she passed the Sakamichi Series Joint Audition and was assigned to Hiragana Keyakizaka46. She first appeared in the group's concert on December 13 at the Nippon Budokan. Her catchphrase is "A curveball anytime, anywhere, Hinanonano!" (Note: いつでもどこでも変化球、ひなのなの！, Itsudemo dokodemo henkakyū, Hinanonano!) When she joined Hiragana Keyakizaka46, she was its only third generation member, until the three other members joined her in February 2020, a year after the group was rebranded to Hinatazaka46; she has been described as the "second coming" of Neru Nagahama, who was also the only member when Hiragana Keyakizaka46 was formed.

Kamimura is the first Hinatazaka46 non-founding member to have released a solo song, "Ichiban Suki da to Min'na ni Itte ita Shōsetsu no Taitoru o Omoidasenai", (Note: 一番好きだとみんなに言っていた小説のタイトルを思い出せない; lit. 'I Can't Remember the Title of the Novel I Told Everyone is My Favorite') released on the group's third single in 2019. She also appeared in the group's television dramas Dasada (2020) and Koeharu! (2021).

Kamimura wrote for a column titled Pure and Straightforward Curveball (ピュアで真っすぐな変化球, Pyua de Massuguna Henkakyū) in the Nikkei Entertainment magazine from 2022 to 2025, where she shared about daily moments that emotionally moved her. A compilation of her articles titled Henteko Switch (へんてこスイッチ; lit. 'Oddball Switch') was published by Nikkei Business Publications on April 9, 2025, and placed 14th on the Oricon Weekly Book chart.

In 2023, Kamimura's first photobook, Sono Mama de (そのままで; lit. 'Just As She Is'), was released by Shufu to Seikatsusha. It was shot at three locations with personal significance to her: Miyazaki Prefecture, which had maintained a close relationship with Hinatazaka46; Chichibu, Saitama Prefecture, where she had visited a shrine to pray during the Sakamichi Series Joint Audition period; and Tokyo, where she was born and raised. It sold 36 thousand copies in its release week and topped the Oricon Weekly Photobook chart. The same year, she starred as Serufu Yua in the live-action adaptation of the animated series Do It Yourself!!, originally aired on Mainichi Broadcasting System and TBS Television. She also became the center (lead performer) of the group's 10th single, "Am I Ready?".

Having been part of the lineups of all Hinatazaka46 title songs up to 2025, Kamimura was not selected for that of the group's 2026 16th single, "Cliffhanger", and instead became the center of the non-selected team, Hiragana Hinatazaka46 (ひなた坂46), making her the first member to have been both title song and Hiragana Hinatazaka46 center. In an interview, she commented that she had always "respected" Hiragana Hinatazaka46 and hoped to "make a lot of eye contact". She returned to the title song lineups of both subsequent singles of that year, "Kind of Love" and "Ichaicha Mushi".

== Image ==
Yohei Nakayama of Real Sound described Kamimura as a "unique" character who combines "seriousness" and "surrealism", and she has been noted for her inventive use of words. Nakayama also remarked that the rock-style dance music of her solo song was "unexpected from a Sakamichi group" and compared her "cool and powerful" singing voice to that of Ami Suzuki.

== Personal life ==
Kamimura is an only child. She enjoys the long-running detective series AIBOU: Tokyo Detective Duo and was one of the entertainers interviewed for the show's twentieth anniversary commemoration in 2019.

== Filmography ==
=== Television series ===
Year	Title	Role	Notes	Ref(s)
2020	Dasada	Sumire Gotanda		
2021	Koeharu!	Airi Kusama		
2023	Nani ka Okashii 2 (何かおかしい2)	Higuchi		
2023	Do It Yourself!!	Serufu Yua	Lead role	
2024	Usotoki Rhetoric	Maid	Episode 2	

=== Web short ===
Web short
- The Cute Female Manager's Brutal Training Is Too Much to Bear on YouTube

- AimaiMe, Vol. 40 "The Cute Female Manager's Brutal Training Is Too Much to Bear" (可愛い女子マネのスパルタ特訓が辛すぎる), tie-in to the 2025 World Table Tennis Championships, 2025

=== Commercials ===
Commercials
- Sony Assurance series on X

- Sony Assurance (Sony Financial Group), 2024

== Discography ==
Kamimura's notable appearances in Hinatazaka46's music releases include:

- "Yasashisa ga Jama o Suru" ("Do Re Mi Sol La Si Do" B-side, 2019), as the "Respect Three" trio with Miho Watanabe and Shiho Katō
- "Ichiban Suki da to Min'na ni Itte ita Shōsetsu no Taitoru o Omoidasenai" ("Konna ni Suki ni Natchatte Ii no?" B-side, 2019), solo
- "Nandodemo Nandodemo" ("Tteka" B-side, 2021), center (lead performer), official support song for the 2021 All-Japan High School Quiz
- "Sonota Ōzei Type" ("Tsuki to Hoshi ga Odoru Midnight" B-side, 2022), with Yūka Kageyama, Miku Kanemura, and Suzuka Tomita
- "Am I Ready?" (2023), center
- "Kimi to Ikiru" (released on "Cliffhanger", 2026), center

== Other appearances ==
=== Radio ===
- Hinatazaka46 no Hi (Nippon Cultural Broadcasting), host (2025–present)

== Bibliography ==
- Pure and Straightforward Curveball (ピュアで真っすぐな変化球, Pyua de Massuguna Henkakyū), series in Nikkei Entertainment magazine (2022–2025)
- Sono Mama de (そのままで; lit. 'Just As She Is'), photobook, Shufu to Seikatsusha, ISBN 978-4391159004, 2023
- Henteko Switch (へんてこスイッチ; lit. 'Oddball Switch'), book, Nikkei Business Publications, ISBN 978-4296207558, 2025
