= Kumi Sasaki =

Japanese television personality (born 1996)

- 佐々木 久美
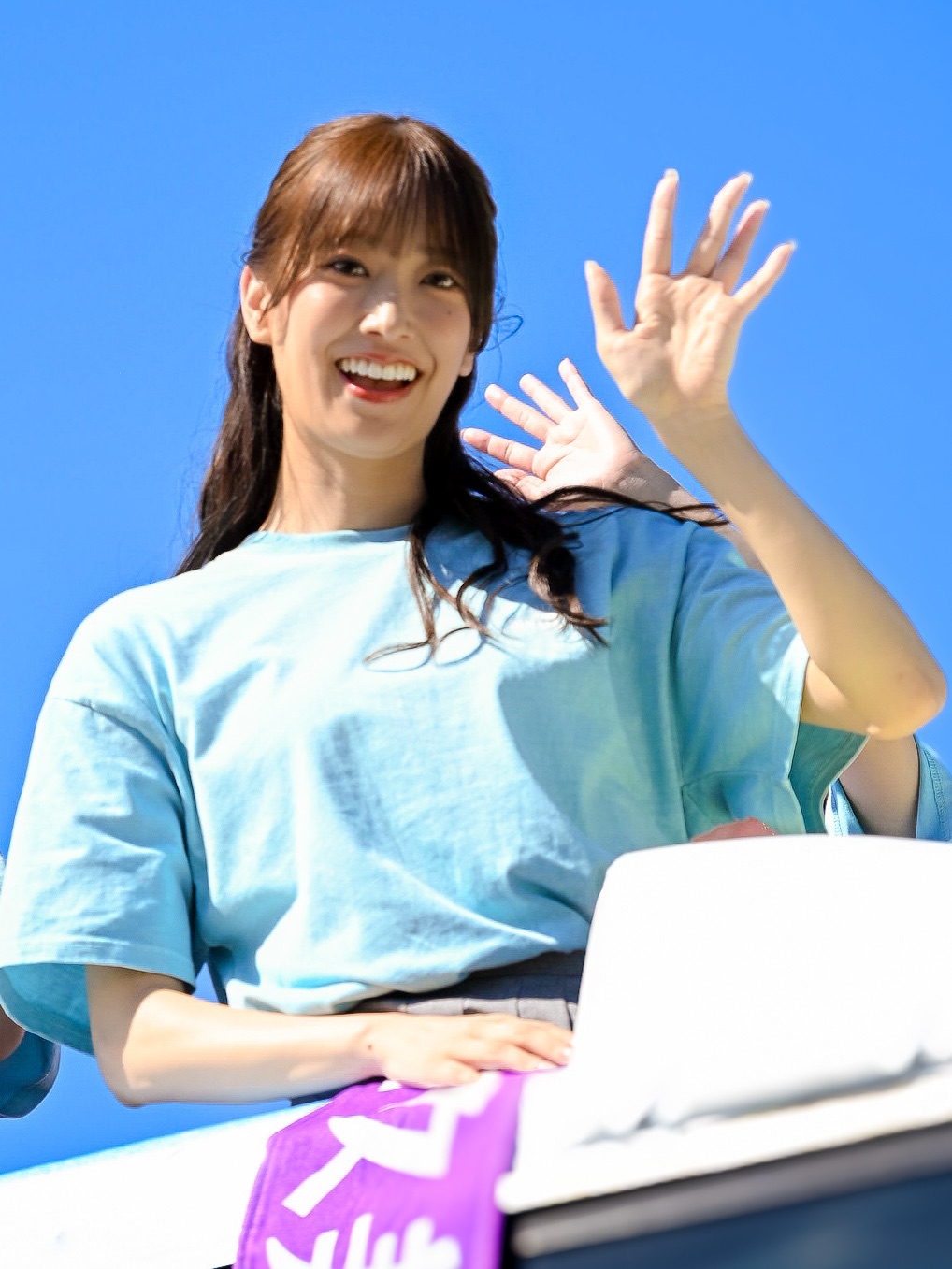
- Sasaki in September 2024
- Born: January 22, 1996 (age 30); Chiba, Japan
- Education: Faculty of Economics, Meiji Gakuin University
- Occupation: Television personality
- Years active: 2016–present
- Agent: Seed & Flower
- Musical career
- Genre: J-pop
- Years active: 2016–2025
- Label: Sony Music
- Formerly of: Hinatazaka46
- Modeling information
- Height: 168.5 cm (5 ft 6 in)
- Hair color: Brown
- Eye color: Black
- Website: Official website

Kumi Sasaki (Japanese: 佐々木 久美, Hepburn: Sasaki Kumi; born January 22, 1996) is a Japanese television personality. She is a former founding member and captain of Japanese girl group Hinatazaka46 (formerly Hiragana Keyakizaka46).

Sasaki joined Hiragana Keyakizaka46 in 2016 and was appointed its captain in 2018, and continued as captain after the group's rebranding into Hinatazaka46 in 2019 until her departure in 2025. She has hosted several television variety shows, and was also an exclusive model for the fashion magazine Ray from 2019 to 2025.

== Career ==
Sasaki's musical career began on May 11, 2016, when she passed the auditions for new members of Keyakizaka46's subgroup Hiragana Keyakizaka46 and joined Hiragana Keyakizaka46 as the "first generation". Her first concert took place on October 28 at Akasaka Blitz, where she performed Keyakizaka46 songs "Silent Majority" and "Sekai ni wa Ai Shika Nai", as well as Hiragana Keyakizaka46's own "Hiragana Keyaki". She was a member of the subgroup's first subunit, Lima Cantik (りまちゃんちっく; Indonesian for 'Five Beauties'), and was appointed captain of Hiragana Keyakizaka46 on a live stream on June 3, 2018. Her fandom name has been Kumitens (くみてんず, Kumitenzu; optionally appended with a giraffe emoji).

Sasaki's first fashion show appearance was at the 27th Tokyo Girls Collection Autumn/Winter event, which took place on September 1, 2018. In February 2019, she became an exclusive model for the fashion magazine Ray.

Hiragana Keyakizaka46 was rebranded into Hinatazaka46 in February 2019, with Sasaki retaining her captaincy. She hosted the 2019 MTV Video Music Awards Japan along with fellow Hinatazaka46 members Mirei Sasaki, Nao Kosaka, and Miho Watanabe. She was the title song center (lead performer) for "Kimi wa 0 kara 1 ni nare", the main song of the group's second album (third since its formation as Hiragana Keyakizaka46), Myakuutsu Kanjō (2023).

From 2020 to 2022, Sasaki co-hosted talk shows on TV Asahi and Abema such as Mieru and 2:59. She hosted the financial radio program Radionomics on the J-Wave radio station from 2024 to 2026. As a sports enthusiast, she has gone on location reporting of the annual MLB All-Star games in the United States since 2023 until 2025 and participated in location reporting with TV Tokyo for the 2024 World Team Table Tennis Championships in Busan and the 2024 Summer Olympics in Paris. In 2024, the baseball team Yomiuri Giants released limited edition merchandise featuring her name to commemorate her throwing out a ceremonial first pitch at their home stadium, the Tokyo Dome.

Sasaki is a fan of the manga series One Piece. In December 2020, she released an original set of stamps for the messaging application Line based on the series, as part of the "LINE Creators Collaboration x One Piece" campaign. On September 3, 2021, she also participated in a collaboration event between the series and the JAXA space agency to commemorate the series's 1000th chapter, which featured the manga characters visiting the Kibō space module.

On January 6, 2025, Sasaki and fellow first generation members Mirei Sasaki and Mana Takase announced that they would part ways with Hinatazaka46 after the promotional cycle of the group's 13th single, marking the end of the founding first generation's tenure in the group. She also ended her contract with Ray, with her final appearance in its May 2025 issue. Her first photobook, titled Mekuru no Hibi (めくる日々; lit. 'Turning Through Days') and photographed in Tokyo and Langkawi, Malaysia, was published on March 25 by Ray publisher Shufunotomosha. It sold around 16,000 copies in its release week and topped the Oricon Weekly Photobooks chart. Her "graduation" ceremony took place on April 6 at the Yokohama Stadium as part of the group's Hinatansai anniversary concert, during which she named vice captain Mikuni Takahashi her successor as captain.

As a solo talent, Sasaki continues to be represented by Seed & Flower, the talent agency that manages Hinatazaka46. She appeared in the drama My Fave, The Killer (2025) as supporting character Shihō Yanagida, her first acting role outside Hinatazaka46 dramas.

== Image ==
In an interview with Sodane, Neru Nagahama described Sasaki as a "fun" girl who "breaks the convention" of idols and was able to bring out the hidden qualities of other members. Mirei Sasaki noted that she had been regarded as a natural leader since the group early days, making her the captain even "before she was officially appointed". Her vocal projection is frequently cited as a key element in her ability to command a concert venue and boost the morale of both the audience and her fellow members. This stage presence is supported by her technical skill in dance, which stems from years of experience in classical ballet; in an interview with Real Sound, Yūka Kageyama credited her with helping the other members improve their dancing.

== Personal life ==
Sasaki has an older brother. She owns a cat named Tororo.

== Filmography ==
=== Variety and talk shows ===
Sasaki's variety and talk show appearances
Year	Title	Role	Notes	Ref(s)
2020–2021	Mieru	Co-host		
2021–2022	2:59	Co-host		

=== Television series ===
Sasaki's TV series appearances
Year	Title	Role	Notes	Ref(s)
2017	Re:Mind	Kumi Sasaki		
2020	Dasada	Yuriko Tachibana		
2025	My Fave, The Killer	Shihō Yanagida		

== Radio ==
Sasaki's radio appearances
Year	Title	Station	Notes	Ref(s)
2024–2026	Logisteed Radionomics	J-Wave		

== Theater ==
Sasaki's stage play appearances
Year	Title	Role(s)	Venue(s)	Ref(s)
2018	Ayumi	Multiple	AiiA 2.5 Theater Tokyo	

== Bibliography ==
- Mekuru no Hibi (めくる日々; lit. 'Turning Through Days'), photobook, 2025, Shufunotomosha, ISBN 9784073503842

== Discography ==
The following are Sasaki's notable participation in Hiragana Keyakizaka46 and Hinatazaka46 discography.

- "Chinmokushita Koibito yo" (2017, released on Masshiro na Mono wa Yogoshitaku naru), first release with the Lima Cantik subunit
- "Kimi wa 0 kara 1 ni Nare" (2023, main song of Myakuutsu Kanjō), first title song center (lead performer) position
