= One Choice =

2023 single by Hinatazaka46

- Type-A cover, featuring Akari Nibu

Single by Hinatazaka46

from the album Myakuutsu Kanjō
- B-side: "Koi wa Nigeashi ga Hayai"; "Ai wa Kocchi no Monoda" (Type-A); "You're in my way" (Type-B); "Pakuchi Pīman Green Peas" (Type-C); "Coelacanth" (Type-D); "Tomo Yo, Ichibanboshi da" (Regular)
- Released: April 19, 2023
- Genre: J-pop
- Length: 4:44
- Label: Sony Music Entertainment Japan
- Lyricist: Yasushi Akimoto
- Producer: Yasushi Akimoto

Hinatazaka46 singles chronology
"Tsuki to Hoshi ga Odoru Midnight" (2022)	"One Choice" (2023)	"Am I Ready?" (2023)

Music video
- "One choice" on YouTube
- "Koi wa Nigeashi ga Hayai" on YouTube
- "Coelacanth" on YouTube
- "Tomo yo, Ichibanboshi da" on YouTube

"One Choice" is the ninth single by Japanese idol group Hinatazaka46. It was released on April 19, 2023 through Sony Music Entertainment Japan and features the first appearance of Akari Nibu as the lead performer of a title song. It is the last single featuring Yūka Kageyama.

== Production and release ==
On March 1, 2023, Hinatazaka46 announced on a YouTube live broadcast that their ninth single would be released on April 19. The title, "One Choice", was announced on March 15 in a teaser video, and the full-length music video was released on March 27. Akari Nibu served as center (lead performer) for the first time in a title song. The song was first performed live at the fourth Hinatansai anniversary concert in Yokohama Stadium on April 1–2, 2023.

The plot of the music video, described by Oricon as "comical", references Nibu's interest in multiplayer gaming, and several costumes worn in previous music videos are featured. Yūka Kageyama, for whom the single would be her last one with the group, was assigned to the front row of the choreography for the first time in a title song.

The single was released in five versions: Type-A, Type-B, Type-C, Type-D, and a regular edition. The bonus Blu-ray of Type-A and Type-B contain parts of the "Happy Smile Tour 2022" concert at the Yoyogi National Gymnasium on November 12–13, 2022, while those of Type-C and Type-D contain parts of the fourth generation members' introduction concert, or "reception event", on February 11–12, 2023, as well as behind-the-scene footages from the concert.

The music video for "Koi wa Nigeashi ga Hayai", (Note: 恋は逃げ足が早い; lit. 'Love is Quick to Run Away') performed by the first to third generation members, features several scenes of members in the present composited with footage of them from the early days of the group, then known as Hiragana Keyakizaka46. The dance scenes were also filmed at Yokohama Stadium.

Each generation of members performed one B-side song: "Ai wa Kocchi no Mono da" (Note: 愛はこっちのものだ; lit. 'Love is Our Thing') by the first generation, "You're in My Way" by the second generation, and "Pakuchi Pīman Green Peas" (Note: パクチー ピーマン グリーンピース; lit. 'Coriander, Bell Pepper, Green Peas') by the third generation members.

"Coelacanth" (Note: シーラカンス, Shīrakansu) was performed by the fourth generation members. The group's three youngest members at the time were assigned to the front row, with Yōko Shōgenji as the center. The lyrics compare the excitement of falling in love as an adult with the rediscovery of the titular ancient fish.

"Tomo Yo, Ichibanboshi da" (Note: 友よ 一番星だ; lit. 'Hey Friend, It's the First Star This Evening' or 'Hey Friend, You're the Number One Star') was also performed by the first to third generation members with Yūka Kageyama as the center. The music video was primarily recorded at the Kashima Soccer Stadium in Ibaraki Prefecture and is themed around Kageyama's specialty of football, with lyrics about friends bidding farewell to each other as they set out to pursue different goals.

== Reception ==
"One Choice" sold 473 thousand copies in its first week according to Oricon (538 thousand copies according to Billboard Japan) and placed first on that week's Oricon Singles Chart, continuing the group's streak of topping the chart since its first single, "Kyun".

Real Sound comments that "One Choice" is a modern pop song with a "poignant yet cheerful" melody which makes full use of live instruments, with lyrics that encourages one to "find their own desire" in a society with vast amounts of information and intermingling different values. It also positively comments on "Koi wa Nigeashi ga Hayai" with its upbeat composition reminiscent of house music.

== Track listing ==
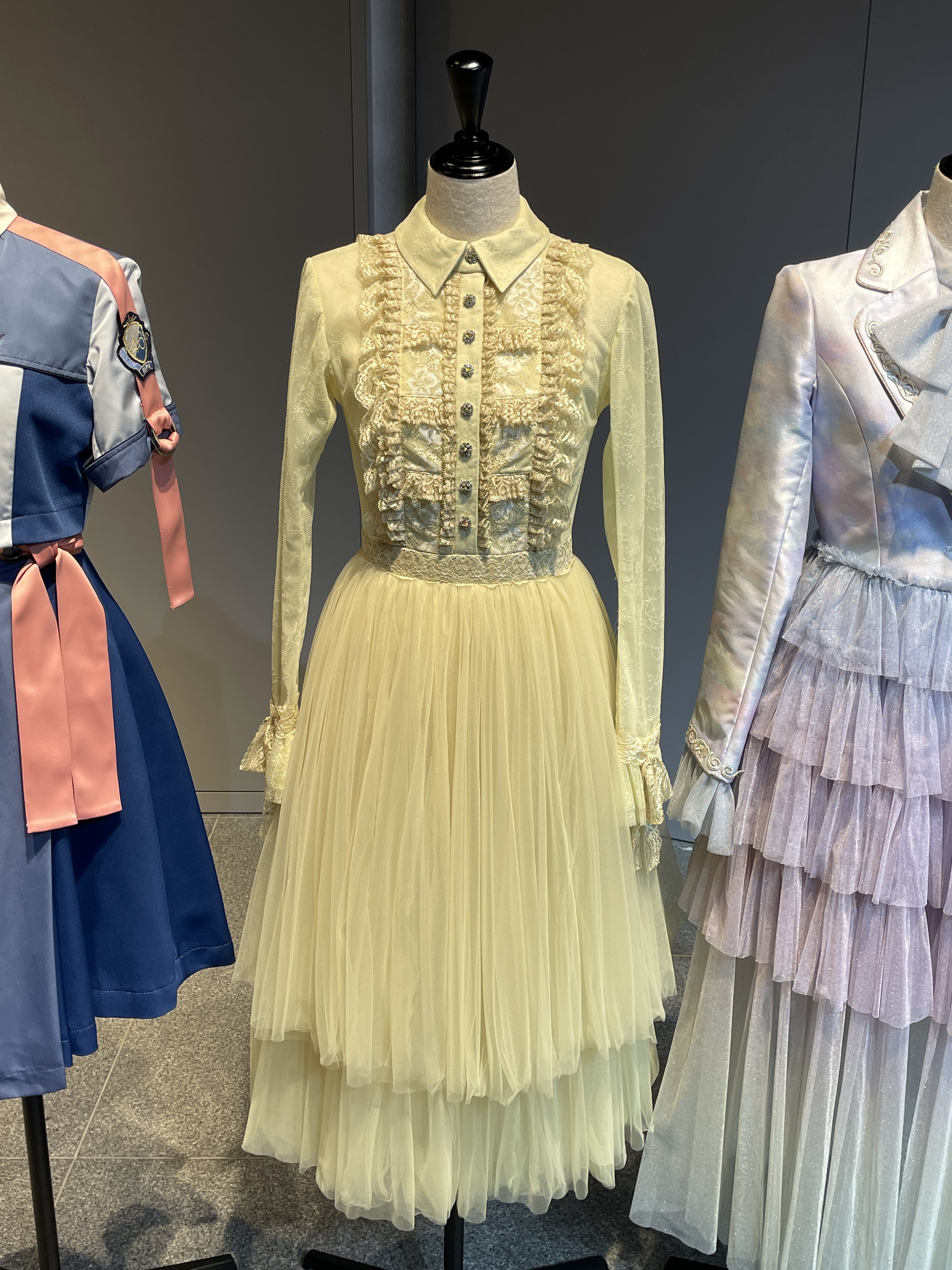
Akari Nibu's costume for "One Choice"

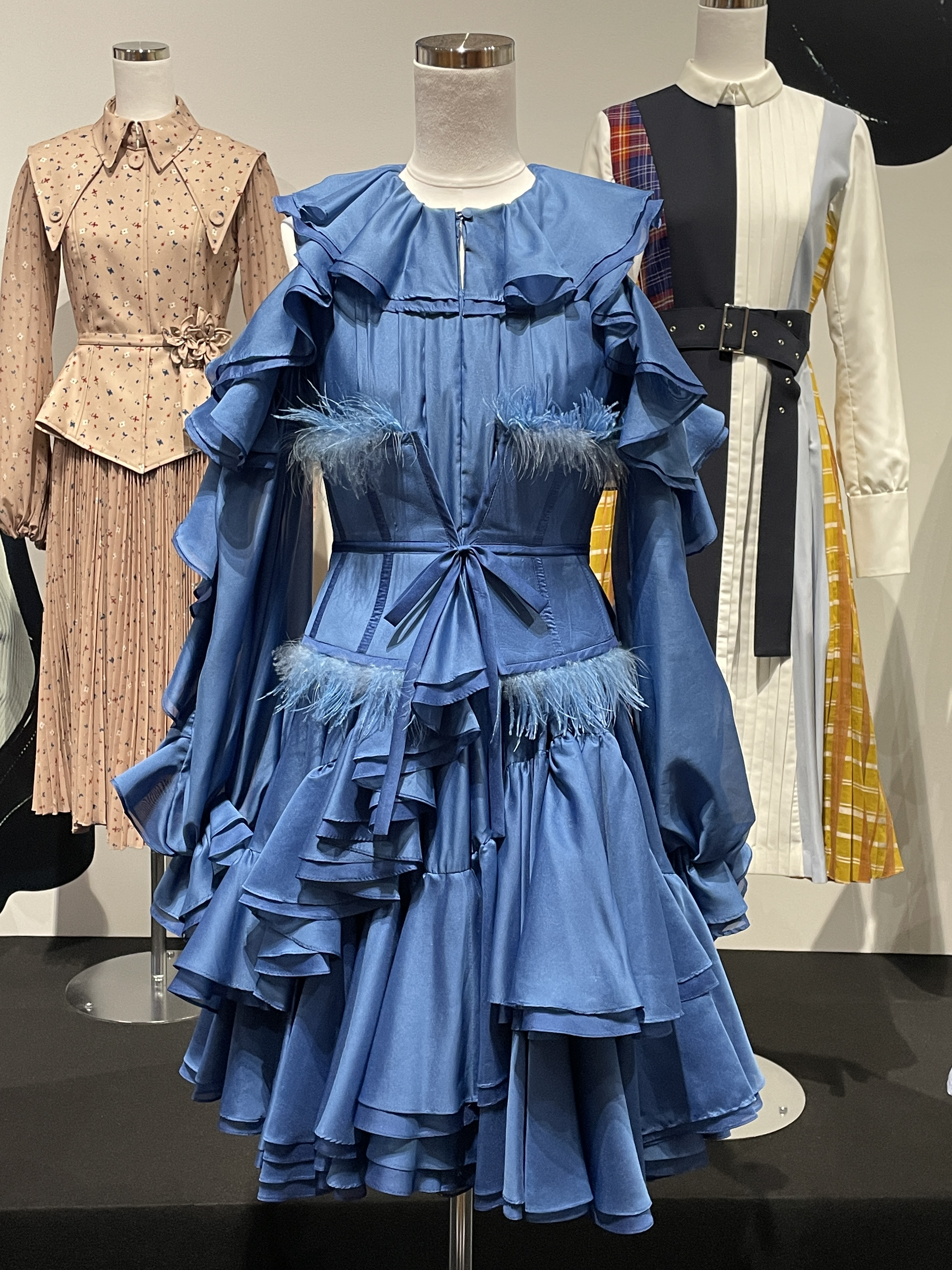
Costume for "Coelacanth"

All lyrics written by Yasushi Akimoto.

=== CD ===
1. "One Choice" – 4:44
2. "Koi wa Nigeashi ga Hayai" (恋は逃げ足が早い) – 4:04
3. Different tracks on each edition:
  - Type-A: "Ai wa Kocchi no Mono da" (愛はこっちのものだ) – 3:50
  - Type-B: "You're in my way" – 3:41 (Type-B)
  - Type-C: "Pakuchi Pīman Green Peas" (パクチー ピーマン グリーンピース) – 4:36 (Type-C)
  - Type-D: "Coelacanth" (シーラカンス) – 4:36 (Type-D)
  - Regular: "Tomo Yo, Ichibanboshi da" (友よ 一番星だ) – 4:12 (Regular)
4. "One Choice" (off vocal ver.) – 4:44
5. "Koi wa Nigeashi ga Hayai" (off vocal ver.) – 4:04
6. Different off-vocal tracks on each edition:
  - Type-A: "Ai wa Kocchi no Mono da" (愛はこっちのものだ) – 3:50
  - Type-B: "You're in my way" – 3:41 (Type-B)
  - Type-C: "Pakuchi Pīman Green Peas" (パクチー ピーマン グリーンピース) – 4:36
  - Type-D: "Coelacanth" (シーラカンス) – 4:36
  - Regular: "Tomo Yo, Ichibanboshi da" (友よ 一番星だ) – 4:12

=== Blu-ray ===
==== Type-A ====
Blu-ray: Happy Smile Tour 2022 (first half)
No.	Title	Length
1.	"Overture"
2.	"My Fans"
3.	"Dare yori mo Takaku Tobe! 2020" (誰よりも高く跳べ! 2020)
4.	"Kitsune" (キツネ)
5.	"Mimi ni Ochiru Namida" (耳に落ちる涙)
6.	"Kimi no Tamenani ga Dekiru Darō" (君のため何ができるだろう)
7.	"Hikōkigumo ga Dekiru Riyū" (飛行機雲ができる理由)
8.	"Kimi Shika Katan" (君しか勝たん)
9.	"Blueberry & Raspberry" (ブルーベリー&ラズベリー)
Total length:		43:18

==== Type-B ====
Blu-ray: Happy Smile Tour 2022 (second half)
No.	Title	Length
1.	"Sonota Ōzei Type" (その他大勢タイプ)
2.	"10-byō Tenshi" (10秒天使)
3.	"Gaufre to Kimi" (ゴーフルと君)
4.	"Mayonaka no Zange Taikai" (真夜中の懺悔大会)
5.	"Koishita Sakana wa Sora o Tobu" (恋した魚は空を飛ぶ)
6.	"Additional Time" (アディショナルタイム)
7.	"Tsuki to Hoshi ga Odoru Midnight" (月と星が踊るMidnight)
8.	"Shiranai Uchi ni Aisareteita" (知らないうちに愛されていた)
Total length:		39:40

==== Type-C ====
Blu-ray: "Hinatazaka46 Fourth Generation Hospitality Party" — Hospitality Part (日向坂46四期生「おもてなし会」〜おもてなしパート〜)
No.	Title	Length
1.	"Hospitality with self-introduction" (自己紹介でおもてなし)	19:28
2.	"Hospitality with traditional performances" (伝統のパフォーマンスでおもてなし)	14:22
3.	"Hospitality with sudden improvisational drama" (いきなり即興劇でおもてなし)	36:28
4.	"Hospitality with plain clothes fashion show" (私服ファッションショーでおもてなし)	9:32
Total length:		79:50

==== Type-D ====
Blu-ray
No.	Title	Length
1.	"Making of Hinatazaka46 Fourth Generation Hospitality Party" (Making of 日向坂46四期生「おもてなし会」)
Total length:		47:58

== Personnel ==
=== "One Choice" ===
Center: Akari Nibu

- 1st row: Kyōko Saitō, Yūka Kageyama, Akari Nibu, Hinano Kamimura, Shiho Katō
- 2nd row: Suzuka Tomita, Konoka Matsuda, Hina Kawata, Nao Kosaka, Miku Kanemura, Hiyori Hamagishi, Kumi Sasaki
- 3rd row: Mirei Sasaki, Haruyo Yamaguchi, Mana Takase, Ayaka Takamoto, Mei Higashimura, Sarina Ushio, Marie Morimoto, Mikuni Takahashi

=== "Koi wa Nigeashi ga Hayai" ===
Center: Akari Nibu

- 1st row: Kyōko Saitō, Yūka Kageyama, Akari Nibu, Hinano Kamimura, Shiho Katō
- 2nd row: Suzuka Tomita, Konoka Matsuda, Hina Kawata, Nao Kosaka, Miku Kanemura, Hiyori Hamagishi, Kumi Sasaki
- 3rd row: Mirei Sasaki, Haruyo Yamaguchi, Mana Takase, Ayaka Takamoto, Mei Higashimura, Sarina Ushio, Marie Morimoto, Mikuni Takahashi

=== "Ai wa Kocchi no Mono da" ===
Two Center: Ayaka Takamoto, Mei Higashimura

- 1st row: Yūka Kageyama, Ayaka Takamoto, Mei Higashimura, Sarina Ushio
- 2nd row: Kumi Sasaki, Shiho Katō, Mirei Sasaki, Kyōko Saitō, Mana Takase

=== "You're in my way" ===
Center: Hina Kawata

- 1st row: Konoka Matsuda, Hina Kawata, Suzuka Tomita
- 2nd row: Akari Nibu, Nao Kosaka, Miku Kanemura, Hiyori Hamagishi

=== "Pakuchi Pīman Green Peas" ===
Center: Haruyo Yamaguchi

- 1st row: Haruyo Yamaguchi
- 2nd row: Hinano Kamimura, Mikuni Takahashi
- 3rd row: Marie Morimoto

=== "Coelacanth" ===
Center: Yōko Shōgenji

- 1st row: Kaho Fujishima, Yōko Shōgenji, Rina Watanabe
- 2nd row: Kirari Takeuchi, Sumire Miyachi, Haruka Yamashita, Rio Shimizu
- 3rd row: Mitsuki Hiraoka, Honoka Hirao, Nanami Konishi, Honoka Kishi, Tamaki Ishizuka

=== "Tomo yo, Ichibanboshi da" ===
Center: Yūka Kageyama

- 1st row: Mirei Sasaki, Ayaka Takamoto, Kyōko Saitō, Sarina Ushio, Yūka Kageyama, Kumi Sasaki, Shiho Katō, Mei Higashimura, Mana Takase
- 2nd row: Hina Kawata, Suzuka Tomita, Nao Kosaka, Akari Nibu, Miku Kanemura, Konoka Matsuda, Hiyori Hamagishi
- 3rd row: Marie Morimoto, Haruyo Yamaguchi, Hinano Kamimura, Mikuni Takahashi

== Charts ==
=== Weekly charts ===
Weekly chart performance for "One Choice"
Chart (2023)	Peak position
Japan (Japan Hot 100)	2
Japan (Oricon)	1
Japan Combined Singles (Oricon)	1
Japanese Combined Albums (Oricon)	18

=== Monthly charts ===
Monthly chart performance for "One Choice"
Chart (2023)	Position
Japan (Oricon)	1

=== Year-end charts ===
Year-end chart performance for "One Choice"
Chart (2023)	Position
Japan (Oricon)	11
Japan Top Singles Sales (Billboard Japan)	9

== Certifications ==
Sales certifications for "One Choice"
Region	Certification	Certified units/sales
Japan (RIAJ)	2× Platinum	500,000^{^}
^{^} Shipments figures based on certification alone.
