= Tsuki to Hoshi ga Odoru Midnight =

2022 single by Hinatazaka46

- Type-A cover, featuring Kyōko Saitō

Single by Hinatazaka46

from the album Myakuutsu Kanjō
- B-side: "Hey! Ohisama!"; "Kodoku na Toki" (Type-A); "10-byō Tenshi" (Type-B); "Sonota Ōzei Type" (Type-C); "Blueberry & Raspberry" (Type-D); "Isshōichido no Natsu" (Regular)
- Released: October 26, 2022
- Genre: J-pop
- Label: Sony Music Entertainment Japan
- Producer: Yasushi Akimoto

Hinatazaka46 singles chronology
"Boku Nanka" (2022)	"Tsuki to Hoshi ga Odoru Midnight" (2022)	"One Choice" (2023)

Music video
- "Tsuki to Hoshi ga Odoru Midnight" on YouTube
- "10-byō Tenshi" on YouTube
- "Sonota Ōzei Type" on YouTube
- "Blueberry & Raspberry" on YouTube

"Tsuki to Hoshi ga Odoru Midnight" (Japanese: 月と星が踊るMidnight; lit. 'Midnight When the Moon and Stars Dance') is the eighth single by the Japanese girl group Hinatazaka46. It was released on October 26, 2022, by Sony Music Entertainment Japan. Kyōko Saitō served as the lead performer for the title song for the first time. The single also features the first appearance of the group's fourth generation in their music release.

== Background ==
"Tsuki to Hoshi ga Odoru Midnight" was announced on September 10, 2022, during the first concert of Hinatazaka46's nationwide Happy Smile Tour 2022 at the Aichi Sky Expo, followed by the first live performance of the title song. Kyōko Saitō served as center (lead performer), her first time for a title song and her second after 2017's "Soredemo Aruiteru".

== Production and release ==
The single was released in five versions: Type-A, Type-B, Type-C, Type-D, and regular edition. It is the first single released after the departure of Miho Watanabe from the group, and Type-A and Type-B included a video recording of her "graduation" ceremony concert at the Tokyo International Forum on June 28, 2022, which was also the group's final concert with 22 members from three generations. Type-C and Type-D included documentaries about the group's fourth generation members, who debuted in September 2022.

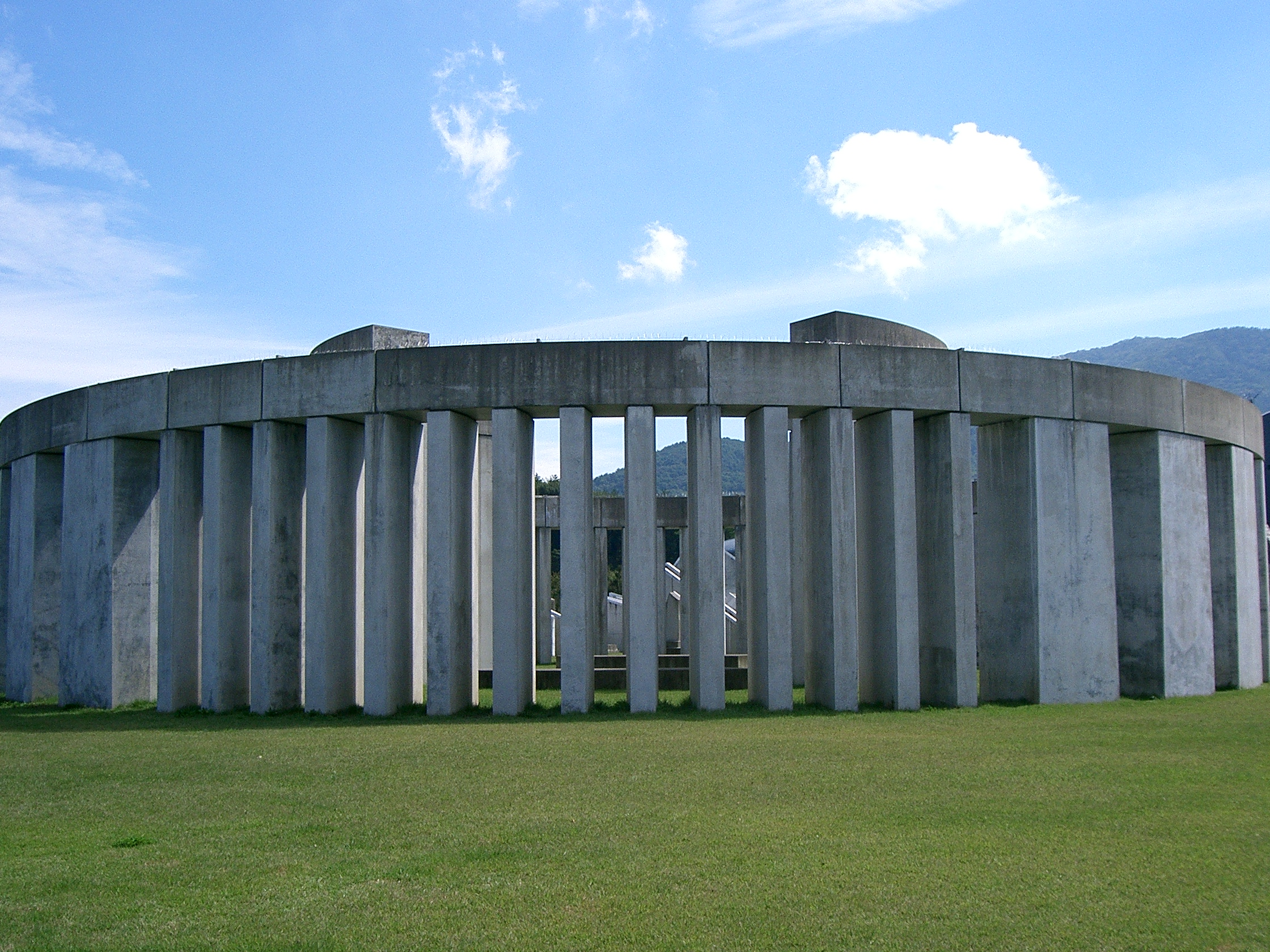
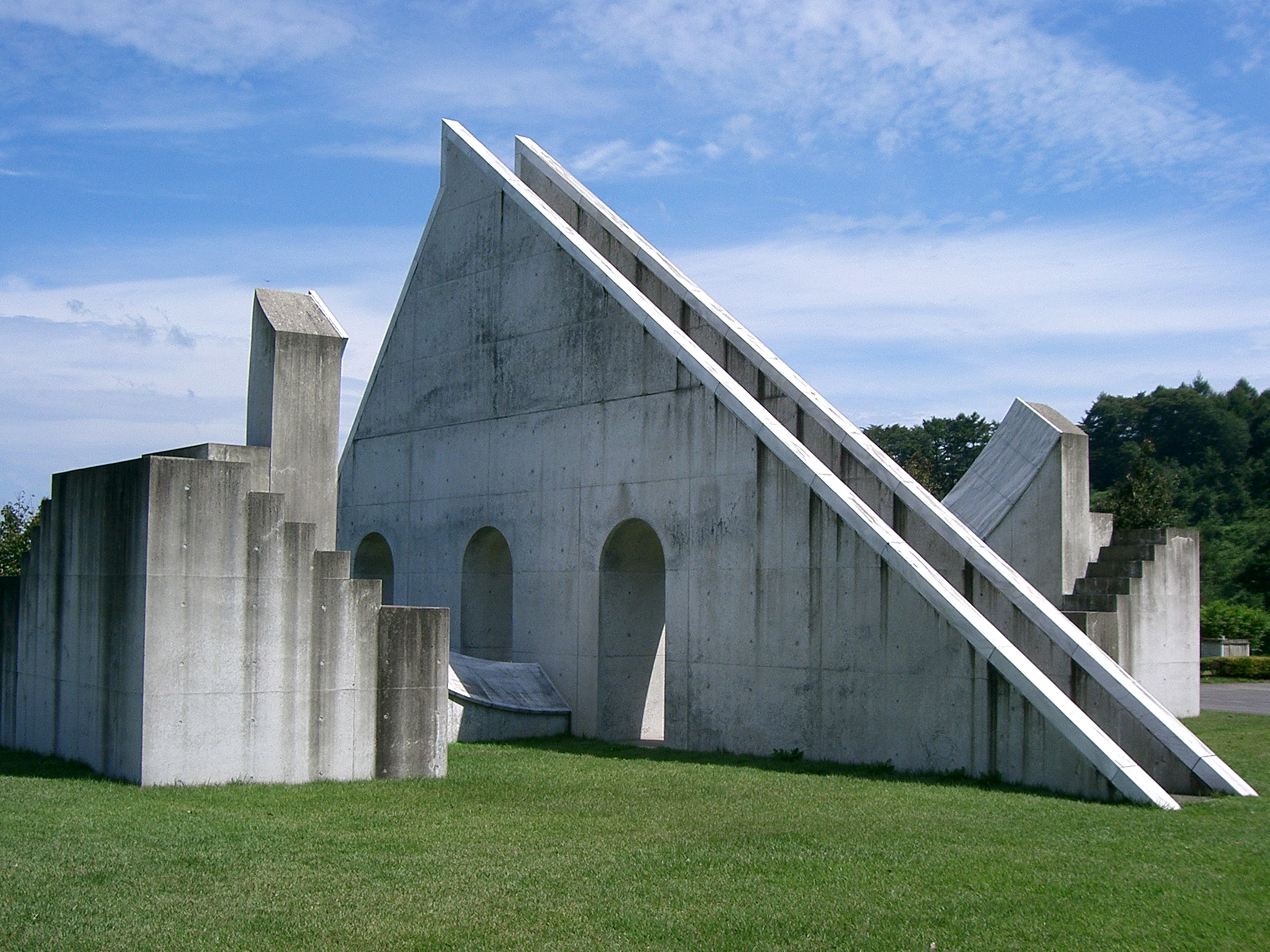
Locations in Gunma Astronomical Observatory featured in the MV

The title song music video, primarily filmed on location at the Gunma Astronomical Observatory, was released on September 18, and those of three of the B-sides have also been released. In addition to Saitō, the front row of the choreography features members who have been the centers of the group's previous main songs (Nao Kosaka, Mirei Sasaki, Shiho Katō, and Miku Kanemura). "Kodoku na Toki" (Note: 孤独な瞬間(とき); "Lonely Moment") is Saitō's solo song, her second one after 2018's "Igokochi Waruku Otona ni natta". "Blueberry & Raspberry" is the first music release by the fourth generation members. "10-byō Tenshi" (Note: 10秒天使; lit. '10-second Angel') was performed by Hina Kawata, Mirei Sasaki, Konoka Matsuda, and Mei Higashimura, "Sonota Ōzei Type" (Note: その他大勢タイプ; transl. "Face-in-the-crowd Type") was performed by Suzuka Tomita, Miku Kanemura, Yūka Kageyama, and Hinano Kamimura, and "HEY! OHISAMA!" and "Isshō Ichido no Natsu" (Note: 一生一度の夏 transl. "A Summer of a Lifetime") were performed by all Senbatsu members.

Manamo Miyata did not participate in the music recording of this single and had announced her graduation from the group for health reasons.

On October 26, 2022, the rehearsal dance video for the title song was released.

"10-byō Tenshi", "Sonota Ōzei Type" and "Blueberry & Raspberry" were first performed on November 12–13, 2022, during Hinatazaka46's nationwide Happy Smile Tour 2022 at the on Yoyogi National Gymnasium 1st Gymnasium, while "Hey! Ohisama!", "Kodoku na Toki" and "Isshōichido no Natsu" were first performed on December 17–18, 2022, during Hinatazaka46's event Hinakuri2022 at the Ariake Arena.

== Reception ==
"Tsuki to Hoshi ga Odoru Midnight" sold 423 thousand copies within three days after release, according to Billboard Japan.

On "10-byō Tenshi", Real Sound commented that the four singers' well-balanced singing voices well expressed the "bittersweet" themes of first love and the end of summer, and that the "relaxed" song would likely be used to "cool down" between the group's more intense numbers during live performances.

== Track listing ==
All lyrics written by Yasushi Akimoto.

=== CD ===
1. "Tsuki to Hoshi ga Odoru Midnight" (月と星が踊るMidnight) – 4:36
2. "Hey! Ohisama!" – 4:33
3. Different track on each edition:
  - Type-A: "Kodokuna Toki" (孤独な瞬間(とき)) – 4:13
  - Type-B: "10-byō Tenshi" (10秒天使) – 5:18
  - Type-C: "Sonota Ōzei Type" (その他大勢タイプ) – 5:18
  - Type-D: "Blueberry & Raspberry" – 4:33
  - Regular: "Isshōichido no Natsu" (一生一度の夏) – 4:03
4. "Tsuki to Hoshi ga Odoru Midnight" (off vocal ver.)
5. "Hey! Ohisama!" (off vocal ver.)
6. Off-vocal version of track 3

=== Blu-ray ===
==== Type-A ====
Blu-ray: Miho Watanabe Graduation Ceremony (first half)
No.	Title	Length
1.	"Overture"
2.	"Happy Aura" (ハッピーオーラ)
3.	"Yasashisa ga Jama o Suru" (やさしさが邪魔をする, performed by Respect Three (リスペクトスリー): Shiho Katō, Miho Watanabe, Hinano Kamimura)
4.	"Akubi Letter" (あくびLetter, performed by Color Chart (カラーチャート): Miku Kanemura, Akari Nibu, Miho Watanabe)
5.	"Hanbun no Kioku" (半分の記憶, by second generation members)
6.	"Chinmoku ga Ai Nara" (沈黙が愛なら, by second generation members)
7.	"Seishun no Uma" (青春の馬)
8.	""Right?”" (by third generation members + Miho Watanabe)
9.	"Soredemo Aruiteru" (それでも歩いてる, by first generation members + Miho Watanabe)

==== Type-B ====
Blu-ray: Miho Watanabe Graduation Ceremony (second half)
No.	Title	Length
1.	"Boku Nanka" (僕なんか)
2.	"No War in the Future 2020"
3.	"Koishita Sakana wa Sora o Tobu" (恋した魚は空を飛ぶ, by second generation members)
4.	"Dare yori mo Takaku Tobe! 2020" (誰よりも高く跳べ！2020)
5.	"Hikōkigumo ga Dekiru Riyū" (飛行機雲ができる理由, by center of Miho Watanabe)
6.	"Kimi no Tame Nani ga Dekiru Darō" (君のため何ができるだろう, by second generations members + Hinano Kamimura)
7.	"Joyful Love"

==== Type-C ====
Blu-ray
No.	Title	Length
1.	"Behind the Scenes of the Fourth Generation's First Photo Session"
2.	"Tamaki Ishizuka" (石塚瑶季)
3.	"Honoka Kishi" (岸帆夏)
4.	"Nanami Konishi" (小西夏菜実)
5.	"Rio Shimizu" (清水理央)
6.	"Yōko Shōgenji" (正源司陽子)
7.	"Kirari Takeuchi" (竹内希来里)

==== Type-D ====
Blu-ray
No.	Title	Length
1.	"Behind the Scenes of the Fourth Generation's First Music Video"
2.	"Honoka Hirao" (平尾帆夏)
3.	"Mitsuki Hiraoka" (平岡海月)
4.	"Kaho Fujishima" (藤嶌果歩)
5.	"Sumire Miyachi" (宮地すみれ)
6.	"Haruka Yamashita" (山下葉留花)
7.	"Rina Watanabe" (渡辺莉奈)

== Personnel ==
=== "Tsuki to Hoshi ga Odoru Midnight" ===
Center: Kyōko Saitō

- 1st row: Shiho Katō, Nao Kosaka, Kyōko Saitō, Miku Kanemura, Mirei Sasaki
- 2nd row: Kumi Sasaki, Hinano Kamimura, Hina Kawata, Konoka Matsuda, Yūka Kageyama, Sarina Ushio
- 3rd row: Suzuka Tomita, Hiyori Hamagishi, Mana Takase, Ayaka Takamoto, Akari Nibu, Mei Higashimura, Haruyo Yamaguchi, Marī Morimoto, Mikuni Takahashi

=== "Hey! Ohisama!" ===
Shiho Katō, Nao Kosaka, Kyōko Saitō, Miku Kanemura, Mirei Sasaki, Kumi Sasaki, Hinano Kamimura, Hina Kawata, Konoka Matsuda, Yūka Kageyama, Sarina Ushio, Suzuka Tomita, Hiyori Hamagishi, Mana Takase, Ayaka Takamoto, Akari Nibu, Mei Higashimura, Haruyo Yamaguchi, Marī Morimoto, Mikuni Takahashi

=== "Kodoku na Toki" ===
Kyōko Saitō / Solo

=== "10-byō Tenshi" ===
Hina Kawata, Mirei Sasaki, Konoka Matsuda, Mei Higashimura

=== "Sonota Ōzei Type" ===
Suzuka Tomita, Miku Kanemura, Yūka Kageyama, Hinano Kamimura

=== "Blueberry & Raspberry" ===
Center: Rio Shimizu

- 1st row: Sumire Miyachi, Rio Shimizu, Nanami Konishi
- 2nd row: Haruka Yamashita, Yōko Shōgenji, Kaho Fujishima, Kirari Takeuchi
- 3rd row: Mitsuki Hiraoka, Tamaki Ishizuka, Honoka Hirao, Honoka Kishi, Rina Watanabe (4th Generation Song)

=== "Isshōichido no Natsu" ===
Shiho Katō, Nao Kosaka, Kyōko Saitō, Miku Kanemura, Mirei Sasaki, Kumi Sasaki, Hinano Kamimura, Hina Kawata, Konoka Matsuda, Yūka Kageyama, Sarina Ushio, Suzuka Tomita, Hiyori Hamagishi, Mana Takase, Ayaka Takamoto, Akari Nibu, Mei Higashimura, Haruyo Yamaguchi, Marī Morimoto, Mikuni Takahashi

== Charts ==
=== Weekly charts ===
Weekly chart performance for "Tsuki to Hoshi ga Odoru Midnight"
Chart (2022)	Peak position
Japan (Japan Hot 100)	3
Japan (Oricon)	1
Japan Combined Singles (Oricon)	1
Japanese Combined Albums (Oricon)	15

=== Monthly charts ===
Monthly chart performance for "Tsuki to Hoshi ga Odoru Midnight"
Chart (2022)	Peak position
Japan (Oricon)	2

=== Year-end charts ===
Year-end chart performance for "Tsuki to Hoshi ga Odoru Midnight"
Chart (2022)	Position
Japan (Oricon)	16
Japan Top Singles Sales (Billboard Japan)	20

== Certifications ==
Sales certifications for "Tsuki to Hoshi ga Odoru Midnight"
Region	Certification	Certified units/sales
Japan (RIAJ)	2× Platinum	500,000^{^}
^{^} Shipments figures based on certification alone.
