= Dasada =

Dasada may refer to the following:

- Dasada (TV series), a Japanese television series
- Dasada (constituency), an assembly constituency in Gujarat, India
