= Deemo: Memorial Keys =

2021 Japanese animated film by Shūhei Matsushita

- Kanji: DEEMO サクラノオト -あなたの奏でた音が、今も響く-
- Revised Hepburn: Deemo Sakura no Oto: Anata no Kanadeta Oto ga, Ima mo Hibiku
- Directed by: Shūhei Matsushita
- Written by: Junichi Fujisaku; Bun'Ō Fujisawa
- Based on: Deemo
- Starring: Ayana Taketatsu; Akari Kitō; Akari Nibu; Ayane Sakura; Gaku Hamada; Koichi Yamadera
- Cinematography: Hisashi Ezura
- Edited by: Yoshinori Murakami
- Music by: Yoshichika Kuriyama; Shiho Terada; Kaho Suzuki; Yu Sonoda
- Production companies: Production I.G; Signal.MD
- Distributed by: Pony Canyon
- Release dates: October 22, 2021 (Bucheon IAF); February 25, 2022 (Japan)
- Running time: 89 minutes
- Country: Japan
- Language: Japanese

Deemo: Memorial Keys (Japanese: DEEMO サクラノオト -あなたの奏でた音が、今も響く-, Hepburn: Deemo Sakura no Oto: Anata no Kanadeta Oto ga, Ima mo Hibiku; lit. 'Deemo: The Sound of Cherry Blossoms — The Sound You Played Still Echoes') is a 2021 Japanese animated film produced by Production I.G and Signal.MD, based on the Taiwanese mobile rhythm game Deemo developed by Rayark. It was released theatrically in Japan in February 2022. This was Signal.MD's final anime film as the studio will be absorbed by Production I.G in June 2025.

== Synopsis ==
The titular Deemo is a mysterious character that plays the piano in a castle. One day, amnesiac girl Alice (Ayana Taketatsu) comes falling from the sky, which starts the story of the two of them, the castle inhabitants, and a tree that grows with the sound of the piano.

== Cast ==
Character	Cast	
Character	Japanese	English
Alice	Ayana Taketatsu	Anairis Quiñones; Michelle Marie (young)
The Masked Lady	Akari Nibu	Michelle Marie
Sania	Akari Kitō	Luci Christian
Rosalia	Ayane Sakura	Stephanie Sheh
Hans	Kouhei Matsushita	Bryce Papenbrook
Fragrant Sachet	Naomi Watanabe	Luci Christian
Mirai	Gaku Hamada	Bryce Papenbrook
Nutcracker	Issey Ogata	Mike Pollock
Professor Valensky	Kōichi Yamadera	Mike Pollock

== Production ==
Game developer Rayark announced that Deemo would receive an animated adaptation in November 2019. The film would be animated by Production I.G and Signal.MD, and directed by Shūhei Matsushita, with Junichi Fujisaku serving as executive director and Mebachi as character designer.

The theme song is titled "Nocturne" (stylized in all lowercase), composed by Yuki Kajiura and performed by Hinano Takashima. Takashima was selected through a worldwide audition of 1400 participants that took place from January to July 2020, with the final round being broadcast as part of the Anime Expo Lite 2020 online event on July 4.

Ayana Taketatsu was the first voice actress announced to take part in the film, continuing her performance in Deemo: Last Recital as the voice of main character Alice. In March 2021, it was announced at the AnimeJapan 2021 virtual event that Akari Nibu of Hinatazaka46 would voice the Masked Lady. In July, Ayane Sakura and Akari Kitō was announced to have also joined the cast at the Anime Expo Lite 2021; the official English title of the film, Deemo: Memorial Keys, was also announced at the same event. Five more cast members were announced in October.

The film was Nibu and Kōhei Matsushita's first major voice acting role. Despite this, Fujisaku decided to treat Nibu "equally" and raised his expectations of her, while Taketatsu commented that Nibu's performance did not "feel like that of a first-timer". Meanwhile, Matsushita consulted "word by word" with the director on producing a voice which would fit the film's world, and also drew from his experience as a pianist.

== Release ==
Deemo: Memorial Keys was first screened at the 23rd Bucheon International Animation Film Festival on October 22, 2021. It was released theatrically in Japan on February 25, 2022, Thailand on March 17, and Taiwan on March 25.

On June 4, 2022, American distribution company Eleven Arts announced that it obtained the distribution license for Deemo: Memorial Keys. The film was released in select U.S. theaters on February 2, 2023.

== Reception ==
Yuichi Shigeta of IGN commented that Deemo: Memorial Keys is generally respectful to the source material and would satisfy both newcomers and fans of the game, although it would not exceed the expectations of the latter. The flow of storytelling was considered reminiscent of the game despite the differences in media, and the addition of original characters does not interfere with the main storyline. While the animation is not very "adventurous", he recommended the film to be watched in theaters to enjoy the music to the fullest.

=== Accolades ===
Award	Category	Recipient(s)	Outcome
Bucheon International Animation Festival 2021	International Competition - Feature Film	Deemo: Memorial Keys	Nominated
