= Kashima Soccer Stadium =

Football stadium in Ibaraki, Japan

Coordinates: 35°59′30″N 140°38′26″E

Kashima Soccer Stadium Mercari Stadium
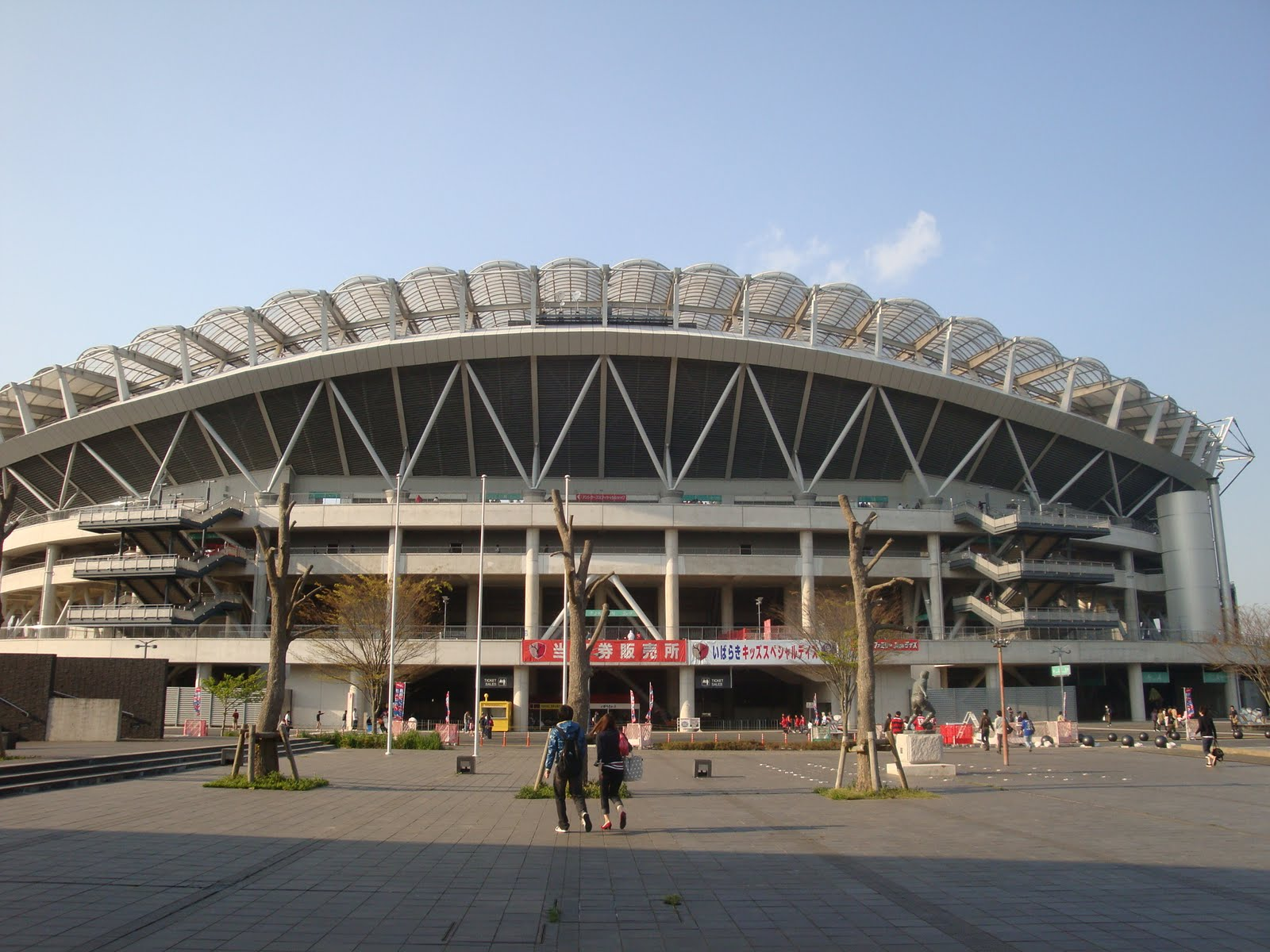
- Interactive map of Kashima Soccer Stadium; Mercari Stadium
- Location: Kashima, Ibaraki, Japan
- Owner: Ibaraki Prefecture
- Operator: Kashima Antlers
- Capacity: 40,728
- Surface: Grass
- Field size: 115 x 78 m
- Public transit: JR East: Kashima Line at Kashima Soccer Stadium

Construction
- Groundbreaking: March 1992
- Opened: May 1993
- Expanded: 2001

Tenants
- Kashima Antlers (1993–present); Japan national football team (some games)

Kashima Soccer Stadium (カシマサッカースタジアム, Kashima Sakkā Sutajiamu), currently known as Mercari Stadium (メルカリスタジアム) for sponsorship reasons, is a football stadium in the city of Kashima, in Ibaraki Prefecture, Japan. It is the home stadium of J1 League club Kashima Antlers. The stadium has a capacity of 40,728.

In 2025, e-commerce company Mercari, the owner of the Kashima Antlers since 2019, acquired the naming rights to the stadium and gave it the "nickname" Mercari Stadium, by which it would be referred in matches and events, while the official name remained unchanged.

Before the creation of the J. League, Kashima's forerunner, Sumitomo Steel S.C., played at the nearby Sumitomo Steel plant's athletic grounds.

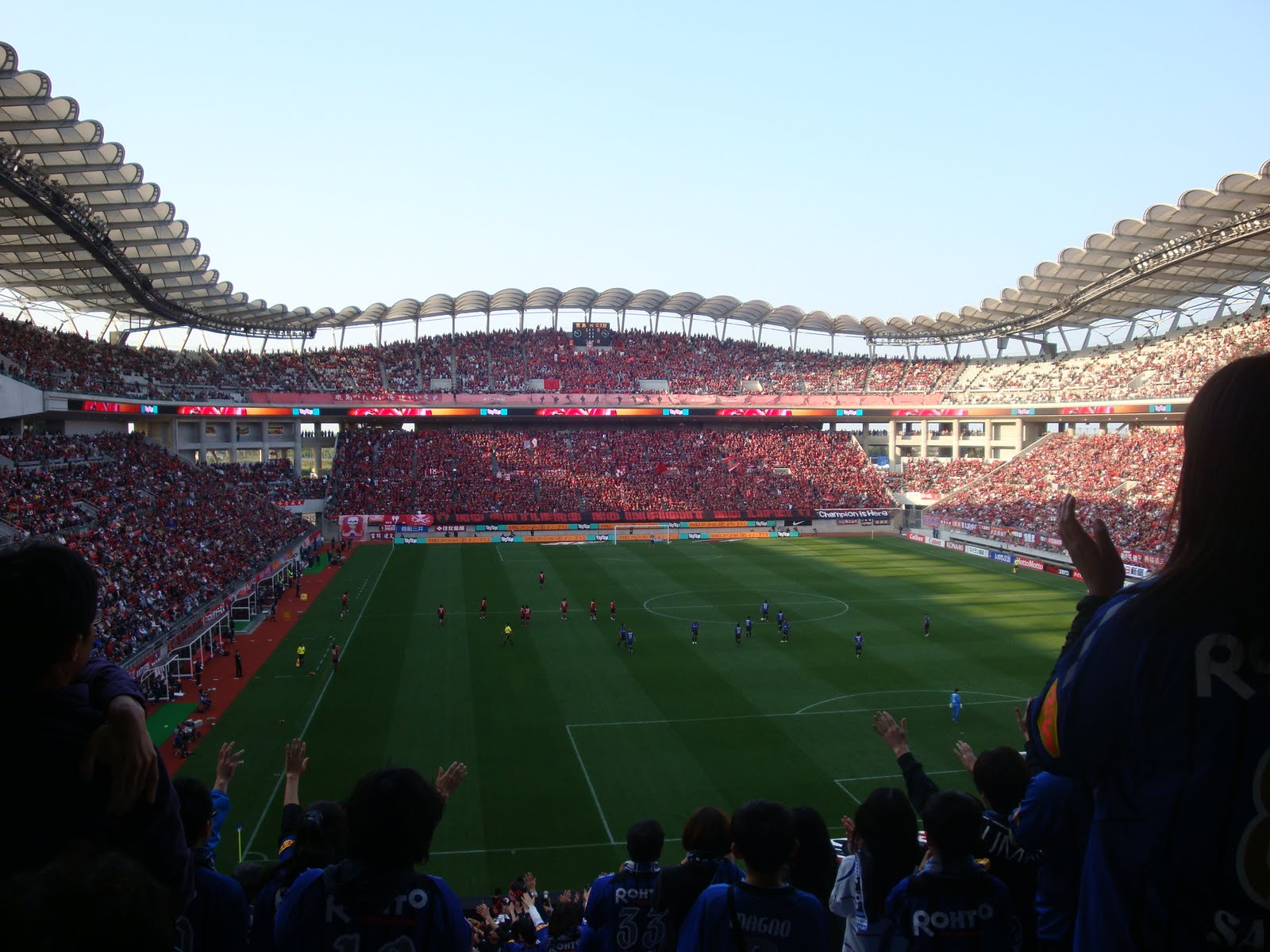

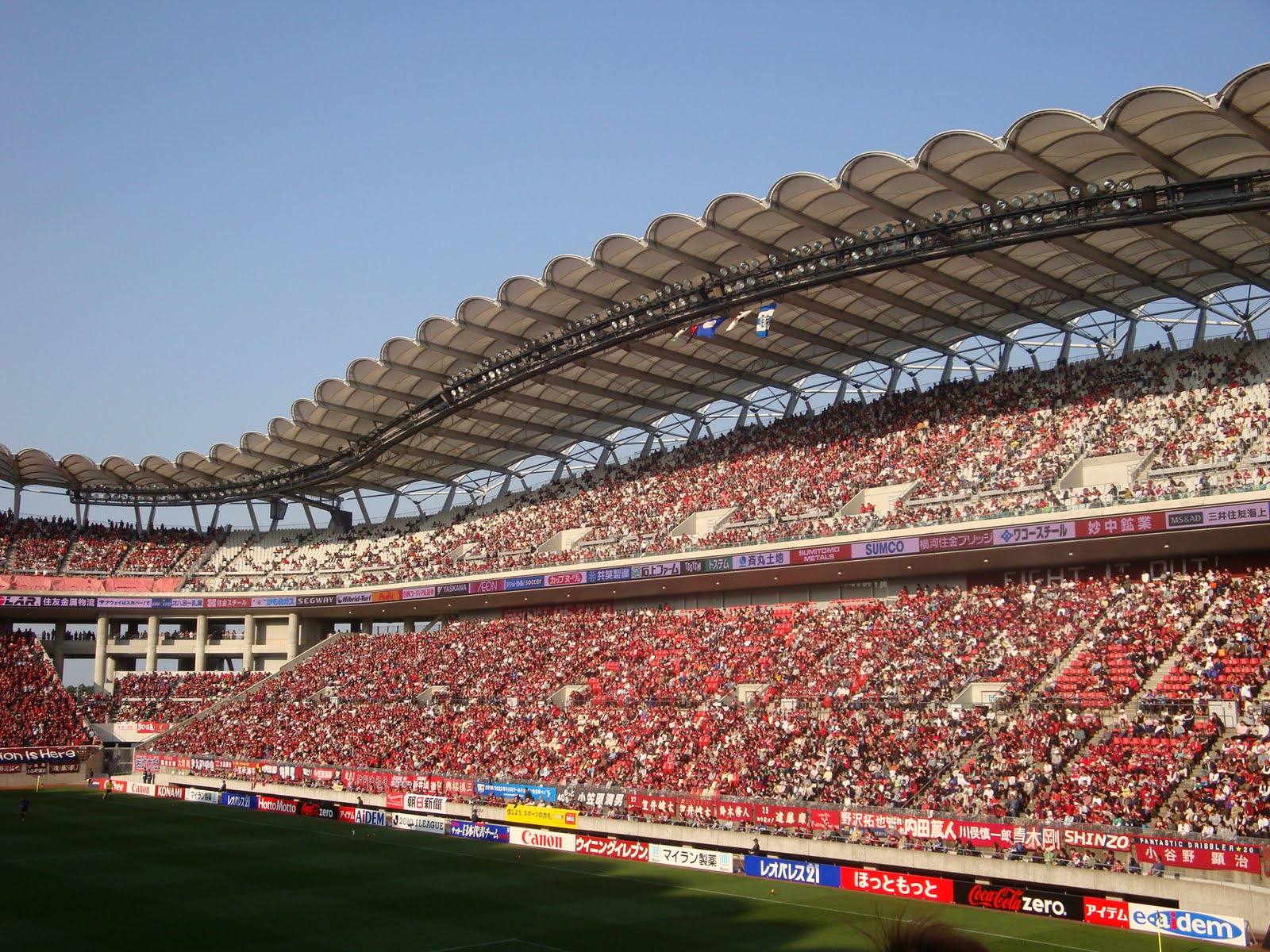

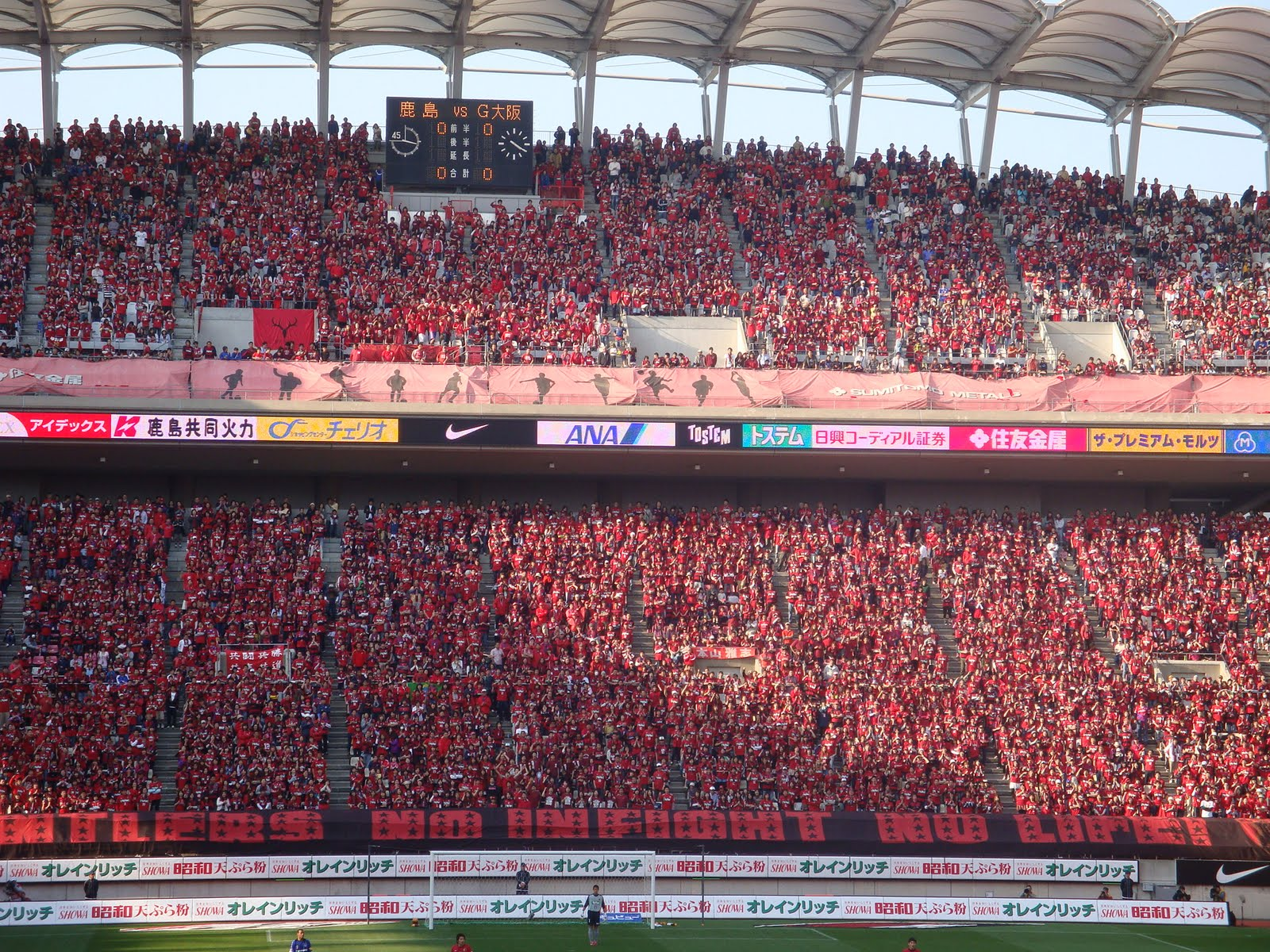

== 2002 FIFA World Cup ==
Kashima Soccer Stadium hosted the following three matches in the 2002 FIFA World Cup.

Date	Time (JST)	Team 1	Result	Team 2	Round	Attendance
2 June 2002	14.30	Argentina	1–0	Nigeria	Group F	34,050
5 June 2002	20.30	Germany	1–1	Republic of Ireland	Group E	35,854
8 June 2002	18.00	Italy	1–2	Croatia	Group G	36,472

== Football at the 2020 Olympic Games ==
Men's Tournament
Date	Time (JST)	Team 1	Result	Team 2	Round	Attendance
22 July 2021	17.00	New Zealand	1–0	South Korea	Group B	0
22 July 2021	20.00	Honduras	0–1	Romania	Group B	0
25 July 2021	17.00	New Zealand	2–3	Honduras	Group B	0
25 July 2021	20.00	Romania	0–4	South Korea	Group B	0
31 July 2021	18.00	Japan	0–0 (a.e.t.) (4–2 pen)	New Zealand	Quarter-finals	0
3 August 2021	17.00	Mexico	0–0 (a.e.t.) (1–4 pen)	Brazil	Semi-finals	0

Women's Tournament
Date	Time (JST)	Team 1	Result	Team 2	Round	Attendance
27 July 2021	20.00	Canada	1–1	Great Britain	Group E	0
27 July 2021	17.00	United States	0–0	Australia	Group G	0
30 July 2021	18.00	Great Britain	3–4 (a.e.t.)	Australia	Quarter-finals	0
2 August 2021	17.00	United States	0–1	Canada	Semi-finals	0
5 August 2021	17.00	Australia	3–4	United States	Bronze Medal match	0

== Other uses ==
In 2023, the girl group Hinatazaka46 released the music video for "Tomo yo, Ichibanboshi da", filmed primarily at the stadium.

== See also ==
- List of football stadiums in Japan
- Lists of stadiums
