= Pickles the Frog =

- Spice Mix character
- First appearance: 1994
- Created by: Nakajima Corporation

In-universe information
- Full name: Pickles The Frog
- Species: Anthropomorphic frog
- Gender: secret
- Home: qua mei dou, France (claimed); Kameido, Kōtō, Tokyo, Japan (suspected)

Pickles the Frog (Japanese: かえるのピクルス, Hepburn: Kaeru no Pikurusu; stylized in all lowercase) is an anthropomorphic frog character created by Nakajima Corporation.

== Overview ==
In 1994, Nakajima Corporation introduced Pickles as part of the Spice Mix Series, based on the concept of "making fashionable plush toys as general goods". The Spice Mix Series was developed in 1993 as a series of general goods plush toys, starting with bears and dogs, and was named after the original fabric made by curling acrylic thread and then mixing and weaving it, resulting in a distinct feel from ordinary plush fabric. Eventually, Pickles became the only character in the series still in production.

According to the official bio, Pickles was born on 1 June 1994, around the beginning of the rainy season. Pickles claims to hail from Qua Mei Dou, France, a wordplay on Kameidō, the location of Nakajima Corporation head office. Pickles' gender is "secret", and Pickles is "one cucumber" in height and "two cucumbers" in weight.

In October 2006, Nakajima USA started to offer Pickles The Frog products.

In 2013, Nakajima Corporation released the Pickles Safety Frog Backpack in collaboration with the Ishinomaki Reconstruction Assistance Network, a nonprofit organization formed in response to the 2011 Tōhoku earthquake and tsunami.

In 2016, the company started a crowdfunding campaign for a Pickles picture book, which proceeds would be partially donated for the reconstruction of areas affected by the 2011 Tōhoku and 2016 Kumamoto earthquakes. The campaign collected 6.45 million yen.

Pickles has been part of the tourism marketing efforts of the Northern Mariana Islands, and special edition plush toys were released in collaboration with the Marianas Visitors Authority in 2017 and 2018. In December 2018, a series of limited edition Pickles dolls was released in collaboration with the girl group Hiragana Keyakizaka46. Pickles has also been featured on the variety show Ametalk! and as merchandise for the drama adaptation of the manga series An Incurable Case of Love.

== Animated series ==
An animated series titled Kaeru no Pickles: Kimochi no Iro (かえるのピクルス -きもちのいろ-; lit. 'Pickles the Frog: The Color of Feelings') was aired on BS12 TwellV satellite channel from 4 October to 27 December 2020. The series featured the voices of Megumi Hayashibara, Saori Hayami, Miku Kanemura, Akari Nibu, and Miho Watanabe, among others. It ran for 12 episodes, each around two minutes long.
