= Konoka Matsuda =

Media personality

- 松田 好花
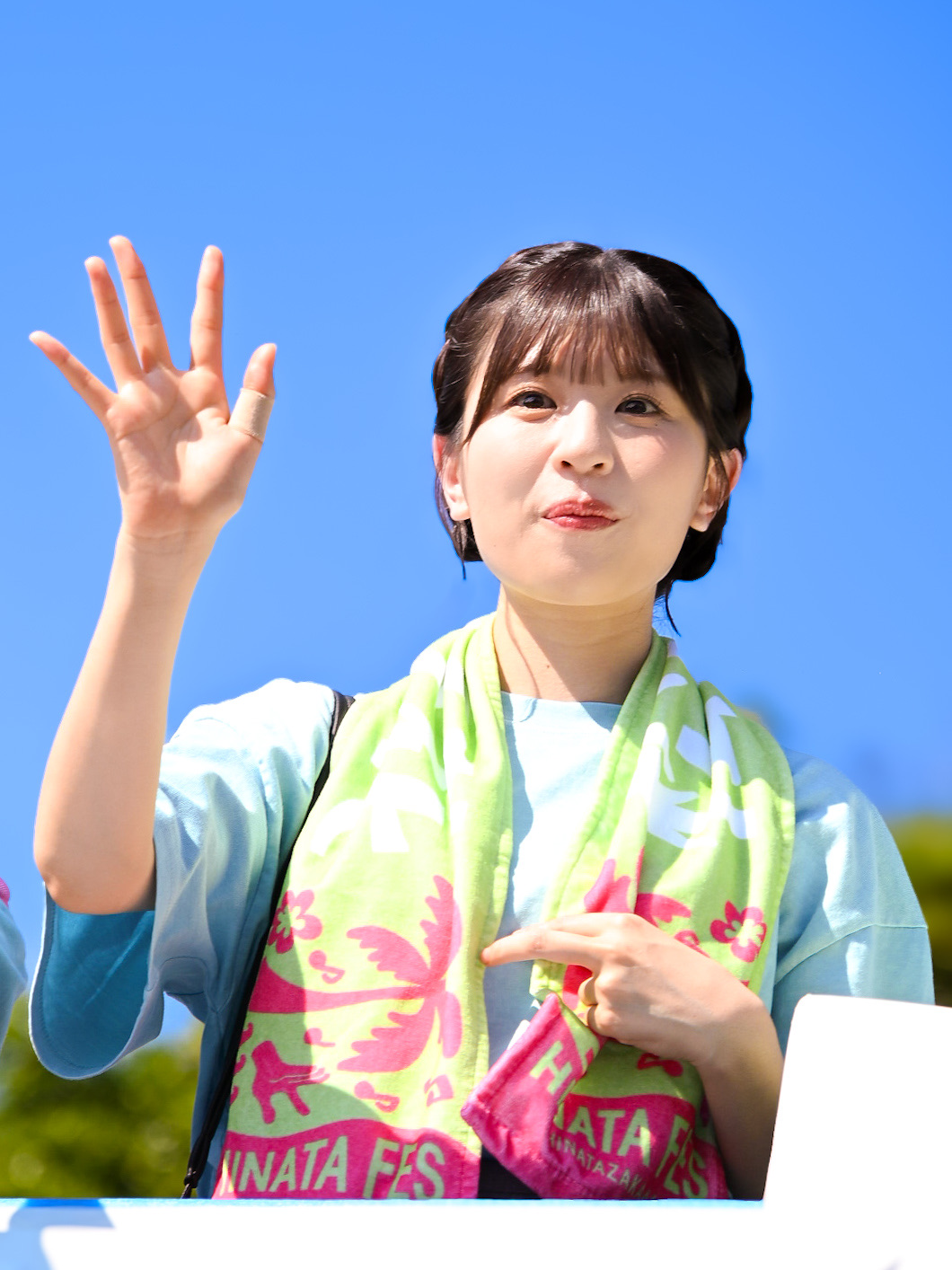
- Matsuda in September 2024
- Born: April 27, 1999 (age 27); Kyoto Prefecture, Japan
- Education: Doshisha University (enrolled in 2018)
- Occupations: Radio personality; television presenter; actress
- Years active: 2017–present
- Agent: Seed & Flower
- Height: 157 cm (5 ft 2 in)
- Musical career
- Genre: J-pop
- Years active: 2017–2026
- Label: Sony Music Labels
- Formerly of: Hinatazaka46
- Website: Official website

Konoka Matsuda (Japanese: 松田 好花, Hepburn: Matsuda Konoka; born April 27, 1999) is a Japanese radio personality, television presenter, and actress. She hosts the radio program Konoka Matsuda's All Night Nippon 0 and has hosted various educational, variety, and morning television shows.

Matsuda was a member of the girl group Hinatazaka46 (formerly Hiragana Keyakizaka46) from 2017 to 2026. As a member, aside from performing in the group's regular music releases, she was one half of the group's guitar duo subunit Hana-chans and played supporting roles in the group's television dramas Dasada (2020) and Koeharu! (2021). She was noted as the first Sakamichi Series group member to be credited as lyricist for a song performed by an entire group, released in 2026 shortly before her departure in February. She hosted her first television show outside the group in 2019 and started her first self-titled radio program in 2021, before joining the long-running All Night Nippon franchise in 2023. Her first self-titled television program, Broadcast Writer, Konoka Matsuda, aired as television specials on TV Tokyo in 2024 and 2025 and as a miniseries in 2026.

After her departure from Hinatazaka46, Matsuda has pursued both broadcasting and acting. She starred in the television drama Maritottsan and appeared in Doubt: Revenge After 15 Years and Retiring from a Wife's Role, as well as the stage play Hagaki no Ō-sama (all 2026).

== Early life ==
Matsuda was born in Kyoto Prefecture and has an older sister. She trained in classical ballet for 15 years, from the age of three until joining Hiragana Keyakizaka46. Prior to attending high school, she participated in a homestay program in Vancouver, Canada. She was a member of her school's taiko club and played guitar in a band.

== Career ==
=== 2017–2021: Early career, Hana-chans ===
Matsuda successfully passed the auditions for the second generation of Hiragana Keyakizaka46, now Hinatazaka46, on August 13, 2017, and was publicly introduced two days later. She made her musical debut with "No War in the Future", included on their parent group Keyakizaka46's fifth single, "Kaze ni Fukarete mo" (2017). In her early variety show appearances, she was noted for her original gag that incorporated her ballet skill. She played female lead Mariko Senri in a 2018 all-female stage adaptation of Rainbow Parakeet, with Nogizaka46 member Junna Itō cross-cast as the titular protagonist.

Matsuda was one half of the guitar duo subgroup Hana-chans (花ちゃんズ, Hanachanzu) with fellow member Suzuka Tomita. The duo released their first and only original song as part of Hinatazaka46's 3rd single in 2019 and held a livestreamed concert outside the group on MTV Japan, titled MTV Acoustic Flowers: Until Full Bloom "Bell & Like", on June 27, 2021.

In September 2020, Matsuda went on hiatus to treat an ophthalmic disease. During her break, she obtained the Kanji Kentei level 2 certification. She made her comeback in the livestreamed Hinakuri 2020 concert on December 24.

Matsuda served as co-host for the "Society and Information" (社会と情報, Shakai to Jōhō) subject on NHK Educational TV's High School Course program from 2019 to 2020. In Hinatazaka46's television dramas, she portrayed idol supporting characters Ochoko in Dasada (2020) and Maririn in Koeharu! (2021).

=== 2021–2025: Broadcasting ventures ===
Matsuda became interested in radio after listening to an episode of Audrey's All Night Nippon featuring her fellow members as guests. In a 2019 location shooting of Hinatazaka de Aimashō in Miyazaki Prefecture, co-host Masayasu Wakabayashi of the comedy duo Audrey remarks that she has potential as a broadcast writer after she correctly guessed the purpose of a segment. She would later study broadcast writing under the mentorship of comedian Mitsuharu Satō, the regular writer for Audrey's All Night Nippon, and pursue various broadcasting activities of her own.

Matsuda's first solo radio program was the self-titled Konoka Matsuda's Hinatazaka High School Broadcasting Club on Nippon Broadcasting System, which ran from 2021 to 2023. In October 2023, she joined the long-running All Night Nippon radio franchise on the same station as a monthly host (final Saturdays of each month) for All Night Nippon 0 (Zero), and transitioned in April 2024 to a weekly schedule for its sister program All Night Nippon X (Cross).

Matsuda served as a weekly co-host for TBS Television's morning show Love It! from August to September 2021 and the Tuesday co-host for The Time on the same station from 2022 to 2025. From 2023 to 2026, she also co-hosted the travel variety show Kasuga Location on Nippon TV with Satō and Toshiaki Kasuga, the other half of Audrey and producer of the show.

Broadcast Writer, Konoka Matsuda (放送作家松田好花, Hōsōsakka Matsuda Konoka), Matsuda's first self-titled television show, was aired on August 10, 2024, on TV Tokyo and follows her efforts to create an original television program. Both Audrey members appear as observers. A second installment, about discovering the unknown sides of the Hinatazaka46 fourth-generation members, aired in August 2025 and features more All Night Nippon radio personalities, namely television producer Nobuyuki Sakuma and comedy duo Magical Lovely.

Aside from broadcasting, Matsuda's first photobook, titled Furimuite (振り向いて; lit. 'Look Back'), was released by Kodansha on May 28, 2024. The photography took place in Vancouver, Canada, where she had taken part in a homestay program before attending high school, and she managed to reunite with her former host family. The book sold 51,000 copies in its first week and placed first on the Oricon Weekly Book Ranking that week; at the end of the year, it placed seventh and second on the annual photobook and annual solo female photobook rankings, respectively, with 65,000 copies sold. During the first Hinata Fes in Miyazaki Prefecture in September that year, she was also noted to start the concert on both days by playing the taiko.

Matsuda placed eighth on the 2025 Oricon Favorite Radio Personality Ranking (Actors/Artists), announced in August 2025. She held her first off-air radio event at the Pacifico Yokohama on December 8, 2025, titled Hinatazaka46 Konoka Matsuda's All Night Nippon X: So You Want to Listen to Matsuda's Talk! in Pacifico Yokohama!. She remarked during the event that she was especially "grateful" that it had sold out, with demand for tickets exceeding the venue's capacity, even before she announced her upcoming departure from Hinatazaka46 the previous week.

Matsuda's "graduation" ceremony merchandise on display.

On December 1, Matsuda announced on her official blog that she would leave Hinatazaka46 in February 2026. The group's 16th single, "Cliffhanger", would include a song with lyrics written by her, titled "Namidame no Taiyō" (涙目の太陽) and performed by all members, making her the first Sakamichi Series group member to write the lyrics for a group (i.e., non-solo) song, as producer Yasushi Akimoto had previously been credited as sole lyricist for all such songs. Her "graduation" ceremony took place on January 29, 2026, at the Toyota Arena Tokyo and she concluded all activities with the group on February 28.

=== 2026–present: Solo career ===
As a solo talent, Matsuda continues to be represented by Seed & Flower, which manages Hinatazaka46, and her official website and fan club, Konoka no Soba (このかのそば; lit. 'By Konoka's Side' or 'Konoka's Soba'; she has made soba noodles from scratch on several television shows and live streams), were launched on March 1.

Matsuda returned to All Night Nippon 0 in April 2026 as the weekly personality for Tuesdays. Her All Night Nippon X Thursday time slot was taken over by Hinatazaka46 member Yōko Shōgenji the same month.

Matsuda starred in Maritottsan (まりっとっつぁん), a retro style television miniseries presented as a rediscovered morning drama from 1990 and broadcast in May 2026 as part of the "Fictitious Masterpieces Theater" (架空名作劇場) series. She was credited as Maika Miyajima (宮島舞花), a fictional "newcomer actress" from 1990, who in turn portrayed Mari Ibuki, a Shōwa-era entrepreneur who achieves success by introducing the Italian pastry maritozzo to Japan (in real life, maritozzo only became popular in Japan in 2021). The series received an Honorable Mention in the 64th Galaxy Awards.

The third installment of Broadcast Writer, Konoka Matsuda, titled Broadcast Writer, Konoka Matsuda: Restart, would start airing in October as a four-episode miniseries. The theme was to have Matsuda "come to accept herself", and the first episode features former Nogizaka46 member Asuka Saitō, who had inspired her to enter the entertainment industry, as well as her soba making. The third episode would feature an original drama directed by Rikiya Imaizumi, with her both as scriptwriter and co-starring alongside Ginpei Sato and fellow former Hinatazaka46 member Shiho Katō. An "episode zero" has also been announced, featuring her trip after her departure from the group with Hina Kawata and Akari Nibu.

== Image ==
In February 2026, television producer Nobuyuki Sakuma remarked that Matsuda had "honed her skills so thoroughly" and possessed a "versatile skillset" she could utilize anywhere. Writing for Bubka magazine, entertainment writer Shin named Matsuda the "Genius of Hard Work" (努力の天才, Doryoku no Tensai) in recognition of her endeavors in various fields.

== Personal life ==
Matsuda's older sister, Arisa Matsuda, held the title of Miss Ritsumeikan 2016 and won the grand prize in the Miss of Miss Campus Queen Contest 2017.

== Discography ==
Matsuda has been in the lineup of all Hinatazaka46 title songs until her departure. Other notable contributions include:

- "Masaka Gūzen..." (まさか 偶然...; lit. 'Such a Coincidence...') (2019, "Konna ni Suki ni Natchatte Ii no?" B-side), with Suzuka Tomita as Hana-chans
- "Naze..." (ナゼー; lit. 'Why') (2020, "Sonna Koto Nai yo" B-side), Dasada original song, performed with Mei Higashimura and Hina Kawata as the in-universe group Factory
- "Midnight Konoka" (真夜中の松田さん, Mayonaka no Matsuda-san) (2021, "Kimi Shika Katan" bonus content), solo song
- "10-byō Tenshi" (10秒天使; lit. '10-second Angel') (2022, "Tsuki to Hoshi ga Odoru Midnight" B-side), performed with Mirei Sasaki, Mei Higashimura, and Hina Kawata
- "Namidame no Taiyō" (涙目の太陽; lit. 'Tearful Sun') (2026, "Cliffhanger" B-side), lyricist

=== Television original ===
- "Röntgen Megane" (レントゲン眼鏡; lit. 'X-ray Glasses') (2021), Koeharu! original song, performed with Suzuka Tomita as the in-universe duo Maririn and Ruby

== Filmography ==
=== Television ===
==== Talk, variety and educational shows ====
Year	Title	Role	Notes	Ref(s)
2019	NHK Anytime, Anywhere High School Course 2019 (Note: いつでもどこでも高校講座2019, Itsudemo Dokodemo Kōkō Kōza 2019)	Co-host		
2019–2020	NHK High School Course: Society and Information (Note: 高校講座「社会と情報」, Kōkō Kōza: Shakai to Jōhō)	Co-host		
2021	Love It! (Note: ラヴィット!)	Co-host	August 2–September 20	
2021–2022	Choten (Note: X-MOMENT Presents CHOTeN 〜今週、誰を予想する?〜)	Co-host		
2021–2022	DAZN Football AFC Asian Qualifiers	Support Ambassador	With Yūka Kageyama and Mei Higashimura	
2022	42nd All Japan High School Quiz Championship	Observer	With Yūka Kageyama	
2022–2025	The Time	Co-host		
2023	Are You Smarter than a 5th Grader?	Contestant	2 episodes; won 3 million yen grand prize on October 13	
2023–2026	Kasuga Location	Co-host		
2024	Broadcast Writer, Konoka Matsuda (Note: 放送作家松田好花, Hōsōsakka Matsuda Konoka)	Main personality	Television special	
2025	Broadcast Writer, Konoka Matsuda Returns	Main personality	Television special	
2026	Broadcast Writer, Konoka Matsuda: Restart	Main personality	4 episodes	

==== Dramas ====
Year	Title	Role	Notes	Ref(s)
2020	Dasada	Ochoko		
2021	Koeharu!	Mari Koshino/Maririn		
2026	Maritottsan	Mari Ibuki	Lead role; credited as Maika Miyajima	
2026	Doubt: Revenge After 15 Years	Momoka Onodera		
2026	Retiring from a Wife's Role	Suzuko Ōsawa		

== Radio ==
Weekly appearances unless otherwise noted.

Year	Title	Role	Network	Notes	Ref(s)
2021–2023	Hinakoi Presents: Hinatazaka46 Konoka Matsuda's Hinatazaka High School Broadcasting Club (Note: ひなこい presents 日向坂46 松田好花の日向坂高校放送部, Hinakoi Presents Hinatazaka46 Konoka Matsuda no Hinatazaka Kōkō Hōsō-bu)	Host	Nippon Broadcasting System		
2023–2024	Hinatazaka46 Konoka Matsuda's All Night Nippon 0	Host	Nippon Broadcasting System	Monthly	
2024–2026	Hinatazaka46 Konoka Matsuda's All Night Nippon X	Host	Nippon Broadcasting System		
2026–present	Konoka Matsuda's All Night Nippon 0	Host	Nippon Broadcasting System		

== Bibliography ==
- Furimuite (振り向いて; lit. 'Looking Back') (2024), photobook, published by Kodansha, ISBN 978-4-06-535909-9

== Other appearances ==
=== Theater ===
Year	Title	Venue(s)	Role(s)	Notes	Ref(s)
2018	Ayumi	AiiA 2.5 Theater Tokyo	Various		
2018	Rainbow Parakeet	AiiA 2.5 Theater Tokyo	Mariko Senri	Co-lead role	
2019	Zambi: Theater's End	Tennōzu Galaxy Theater	Mirai	With Nogizaka46 and Keyakizaka46 members	
2026	Hagaki no Ō-sama (はがきの王様; lit. 'King of Postcards')	Honda Theater, Tokyo; Morinomiya Piloti Hall, Osaka	Yayoi Ureshi		

=== Attraction ===
Year	Title	Venue	Ref(s)
2019	Zambi the Room Saigo no Sentaku	Shibuya Hikarie, Hikarie Hall	

=== Talk event ===
- Hinatazaka46 Konoka Matsuda's All Night Nippon X: So You Want to Listen to Matsuda's Talk! in Pacifico Yokohama! (Note: 日向坂46・松田好花のオールナイトニッポンX 松田のトークが聴きてぇか！ in パシフィコ横浜！, Hinatazaka46 Matsuda Konoka no All Night Nippon X Matsuda no Talk ga Kikite~e ka! in Pacifico Yokohama!) (Pacifico Yokohama, December 8, 2025)
