= Hina Kawata =

Japanese actress (born 2001)

- 河田 陽菜
- Kawata in 2024
- Born: July 23, 2001 (age 25); Shimonoseki, Yamaguchi Prefecture, Japan
- Occupation: Actress
- Years active: 2017–present
- Agent: Seed & Flower
- Musical career
- Genre: J-pop
- Instrument: Vocals
- Years active: 2017–2025
- Label: Sony
- Formerly of: Hinatazaka46
- Website: Official website

Hina Kawata (Japanese: 河田 陽菜, Hepburn: Kawata Hina; born July 23, 2001) is a Japanese actress. She began her career as a member of the girl group Hinatazaka46 (formerly Hiragana Keyakizaka46) from 2017 to 2025. Aside from participating in the group's music releases, she appeared in the group's stage adaptation of Magia Record (2018) and television drama series Dasada (2020) and Koeharu! (2021). She also released two best-selling photobooks in 2022 and 2025. After leaving the group in late 2025, she started pursuing an acting career in July 2026.

== Early life ==
Kawata was born in Shimonoseki, Yamaguchi Prefecture. She trained in the electone as a child and participated in electone ensembles, and aspired to become a pianist. She played volleyball in middle school.

== Career ==
=== 2017–2025: Hinatazaka46 ===
On August 13, 2017, Kawata joined the girl group Hiragana Keyakizaka46, now Hinatazaka46, as a second generation member, and was officially revealed on August 15. She appeared in the 2018 stage adaptation of the mobile game Magia Record: Puella Magi Madoka Magica Side Story alongside several fellow members, portraying Homura Akemi. Within the group, Kawata was known for her gentle and "healing" personality, earning her the moniker "Most Beloved Girl". She and fellow member Hiyori Hamagishi were particularly considered an "inseparable pair" and were noted to have adopted similar speech patterns.

Kawata appeared in the Hinatazaka46 television drama productions Dasada (2020) as Tokkurin, member of the fictional idol group Factory, and Koeharu! (2021) as Tae Honda, a voice acting student who becomes a member of the fictional group Chocola Shocola, with Hamagishi portraying the group's leader. The song performed in-universe by Factory, "Naze...", was released on Hinatazaka46's 2021 fourth single. She and Hamagishi also performed together in Hinatazaka46's vocal unit Mī-pan Family, led by Mirei Sasaki (Mī-pan) as the "mother figure", in which Hamagishi was depicted as the "eldest daughter", despite being a year younger than Kawata. She also served as center (lead performer) for several B-side songs, including "You're In My Way" (2023), "Glass Mado ga Yogoreteru" (2023), and "43-nen Machi no Croquette" (2025).

On March 1, 2022, Kawata released her first photobook, titled Omoide no Junban (思い出の順番; lit. 'Order of Memories') and published by Kodansha. WIth the concept of "365 days of living with her", it was photographed over the course of a year between 2020 and 2021 in various locations in Japan, including the Amami Islands, Kamakura, Tokyo, and her hometown of Shimonoseki. It was the longest photobook of a Sakamichi Series member at the time with 256 pages (Note: The page count record would be matched by Nogizaka46 member Nagi Inoue's photobook in 2025.) and had an initial print run of 100,000 copies, followed by two pre-release reprints that increased its total print run to 140,000 copies; Oricon reported that the initial print run was unusually large even among Sakamichi Series photobooks. The photobook sold 76,000 copies in its first week, placing it first on the weekly Oricon book ranking, and sold nearly 98,000 copies through the first half of 2022, placing it second among female photobooks in the Oricon 2022 first-half rankings, with works by Nogizaka46 members placing first and third.

In August 2025, Kawata announced that she would leave Hinatazaka46 after the promotional cycle of the 15th single, which would be released on September 17. The single would include the final song for which she served as center, "Kotoba no Genkai" (言葉の限界; lit. 'The Limit of Words'), performed by all second, third, and fourth-generation members; the music video includes various references to her previous works with the group and depicts her leaving a rural town and her friends behind to travel to "a new future".

Several of the outfits worn by Kawata in her second photobook, Takeoff.

Kawata's second photobook, titled Takeoff (テイクオフ) and published by Takeshobo, was released on November 11. It was photographed in Copenhagen and other locations in Denmark, and meant to symbolize her departure from the group and a new "starting point". It sold nearly 34,000 copies in its release week and topped the Oricon weekly photobook ranking.

Merchandise display for Kawata's "graduation" ceremony.

Kawata's "graduation" ceremony took place on November 19 at the Yoyogi National Stadium, as part of the group's national Monster Groove tour. In her speech, she reflected on her eight-year career and discussed how she had gradually become "more comfortable" expressing herself.

=== 2026–present: Solo career ===
After her departure, Kawata took a break from entertainment, although she appeared as a special guest at fellow former member Yūka Kageyama's birthday event in May. On July 23, her 25th birthday, she announced her return and the launching of her official website and fan club, "17" (the goroawase numbers of her given name) under Seed & Flower, the agency that managed Hinatazaka46. In an interview, she revealed that she decided to continue in the entertainment industry at Hamagishi's encouragement.

Kawata's first acting role after leaving Hinatazaka46, as well as her first starring role, was in the science-fiction television special Seikai ga Wakaranai on ABC TV, created by the team behind the social media account of the same name, whose work previously won the Mynavi Short Drama Awards 2026. She portrayed Misaki, a young woman living with a "resurrection AI", an artificial intelligence simulation of her deceased mother. She also appeared in the stage production Itsuka Aitsu ni Ai ni Iku: Beyond the Moon in September 2026, which is about a man's journey to meet Elon Musk to ask for his help to go to the far side of the Moon, and provided her voice for the Yūsanchi! from Yū-hachi omnibus anime series.

== Filmography ==
=== Television dramas ===
Year	Title	Role	Notes	Refs
2020	Dasada	Tokkuri		
2021	Koeharu!	Tae Honda		
2026	Seikai ga Wakaranai	Misaki	Lead role; television special	
2026	Yūsanchi! from Yū-hachi	Jirai-chan (voice)		

== Theater ==
Year	Title	Role	Venue(s)	Notes	Refs
2018	Ayumi	Multiple	AiiA 2.5 Theater Tokyo		
2018	Magia Record	Homura Akemi	Akasaka ACT Theater		
2026	Itsuka Aitsu ni Ai ni Iku: Beyond the Moon		Kinokuniya Southern Theater Takashimaya; Ginza Hakuhinkan Theater		

== Discography ==
Kawata has been included in all the Hinatazaka46 title song lineups released during her tenure. Other notable contributions include:

- "Cage" (2019, released on "Do Re Mi Sol La Si Do"), performed with Mei Higashimura, Miku Kanemura, and Akari Nibu as the Yancharu Family
- "Naze..." (ナゼー; lit. 'Why') (2020, released on "Sonna Koto Nai yo"), Dasada original song, performed with Mei Higashimura and Konoka Matsuda as the in-universe group Factory
- "Suppai Jiko Ken'o" (酸っぱい自己嫌悪; lit. 'Sour Self-loathing') (2021, released on "Tteka"), unit track with Mirei Sasaki, Hiyori Hamagishi, and Haruyo Yamaguchi (Mī-pan Family)
- "10-byō Tenshi" (10秒天使; lit. '10-second Angel') (2022, "Tsuki to Hoshi ga Odoru Midnight" B-side), performed with Mirei Sasaki, Mei Higashimura, and Konoka Matsuda (informally known as the "Bread Factory")
- "You're in My Way" (2023, released on "One Choice"), second-generation member song, center (lead performer)
- "Glass Mado ga Yogoreteru" (ガラス窓が汚れてる; lit. 'The Glass Windows Are Dirty') (2023, released on "Am I Ready?"), center
- "43-nen Machi no Croquette" (43年待ちのコロッケ; transl. Croquette with a 43-year Waiting List) (2025, released on "Sotsugyō Shashin Dake ga Shitteru"), second-generation member song, center
- "Kotoba no Genkai" (言葉の限界; lit. 'The Limit of Words') (2025, released on "Onegai Bach!"), final center song

=== Television original ===
- "Hell Rose" (2021), Koeharu! original song, performed in-universe as Chocola Shocola (Kawata, Hiyori Hamagishi, Mei Higashimura)

== Bibliography ==
=== Photobooks ===
- Omoide no Junban (思い出の順番; lit. 'Order of Memories'), Kodansha, 2022, ISBN 4065274052
- Takeoff (テイクオフ), Takeshobo, 2025, ISBN 4801947212

== Other appearances ==
=== Radio ===
- Lawson presents Hinatazaka46 no Hotto Hitoiki! (ローソン presents 日向坂46のほっとひといき!), co-host (rotating) (2023–2025)
