= Nakajima USA =

American Toy Company

Nakajima USA, Inc.
- Company type: Private
- Founded: 2000
- Headquarters: 21041 South Western Avenue Suite 200, Torrance, California, United States
- Key people: Shinji Nakajima (CEO)
- Number of employees: 435
- Parent: Nakajima Corporation, Co., Ltd. (Japan)

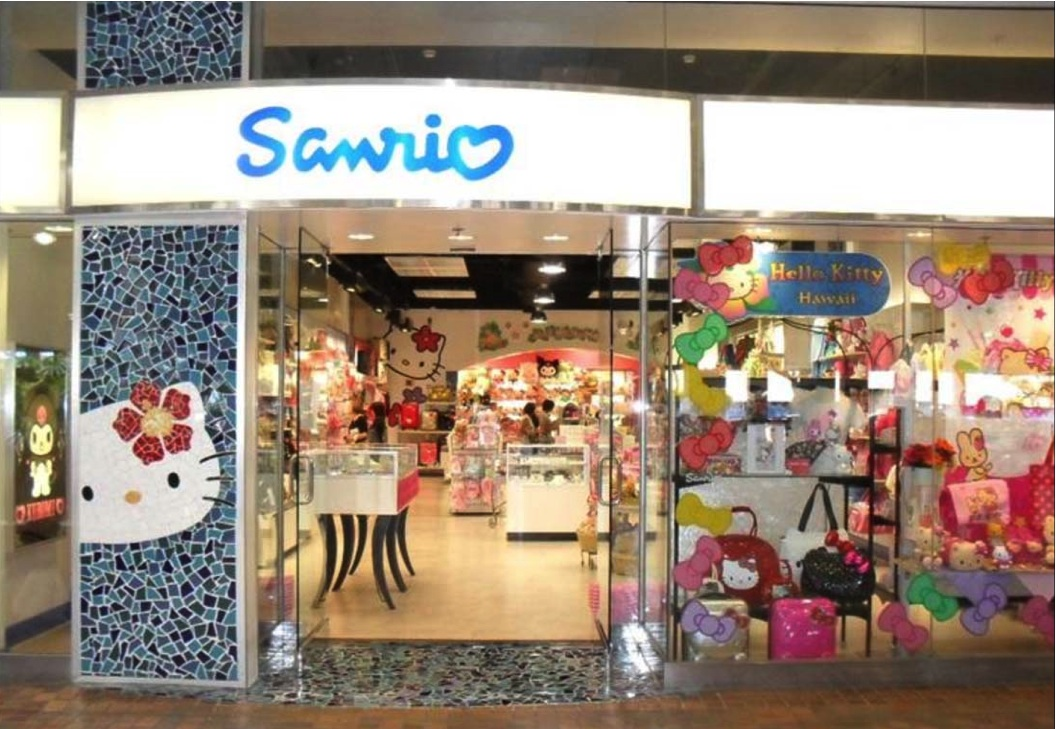
Nakajima USA Sanrio Store

Nakajima USA, Inc., is an American toy manufacturer, founded in 2000. It is a wholly owned subsidiary of Nakajima Japan, a family run company founded in 1919. A seasoned company in the design and manufacture of licensed plush, collectible and seasonal toys and gifts, Nakajima USA currently produces and distributes a wide range of lifestyle products under a master license agreement for Sanrio Inc. as well as the company’s signature characters.

Nakajima USA has produced and distributed lifestyle products for brands including Angry Little Girls, Harajuku Lovers and Sesame Street. Nakajima USA operates in Los Angeles and San Francisco. The stores division, sales, marketing, finance and operations are based in Los Angeles, while warehouse facilities, customer service, credit and merchandise control and based in San Francisco.

== History ==
In 1919, Founder and CEO Koichi Nakajima started celluloid Toy Plush in Kameido, Koto-ku in Japan. They moved their office in 1945 from Kameido to Chuo, Edogawa-ku, where it is currently located. In 1953, the company organization changed to a corporation, and the same year they started producing inflatable vinyl toys.

In 1959, they changed their trade name to Nakajima Seisakusho, and in 1962 they got a license contract with the Walt Disney Company. The same year, they began producing the floating ring, floating boat, and kids' pool. In 1986, their new head office building at 1-7-8 Chuo Edogawa-ku was established.

In 1988, they founded partner corporation Nakakima USA, as well beginning a license contract with Sanrio. In 1991, they again changed their trade name to Nakajima Corporation. In 1996, a new organization with new CEO Shinji Nakajima began.

=== Nakajima USA ===
In April 2004, Sanrio Co. Ltd., expanded its license to Nakajima USA to include all categories of products for US Sanrio Boutique Stores and specialty gift retailers.

Nakajima USA currently assumes responsibility for the US boutique and retail stores business to include 49 independently run Sanrio stores, 47 Nakajima USA corporate-owned Sanrio stores, and the wholesale gift business to include 2000+ accounts nationwide. Today, Nakajima USA is Sanrio’s principle licensee and its primary partner for the Specialty Retail Channel in the US.

Sanrio, best known for icon Hello Kitty and home to many more characters including Chococat, My Melody, and Keroppi, celebrated its 50th anniversary in August 2010. Today, over 50,000 Sanrio-branded items are sold in over 70 countries around the world. In the Western Hemisphere Sanrio character-branded products are sold in upwards of 12,000 locations including department, specialty, national chain stores and over Sanrio Boutique stores.

In 2020, Nakajima Japan head office was moved back to Kameido.

== Prominent Sanrio characters ==
- Badtz-Maru
- Charmmy Kitty
- Chococat
- Cinnamoroll
- Hello Kitty
- Keroppi
- Kuromi
- Little Twin Stars
- My Melody
- Sugarbunnies

== Nakajima original characters ==
- Pickles the Frog
- Baby Coco
- Buta: Coron
- Zou: Coron

== Sanrio stores ==
Typically 1,200 square feet (110 m^{2}) and in major metropolitan malls, Nakajima oversees two kinds of Sanrio Boutique stores. Corporate stores are owned and managed directly by the company while licensed stores are owned and operated by individual store owners in the region.
