= Akari Nibu =

Japanese YouTuber, radio personality, and actress (born 2001)

- 丹生 明里
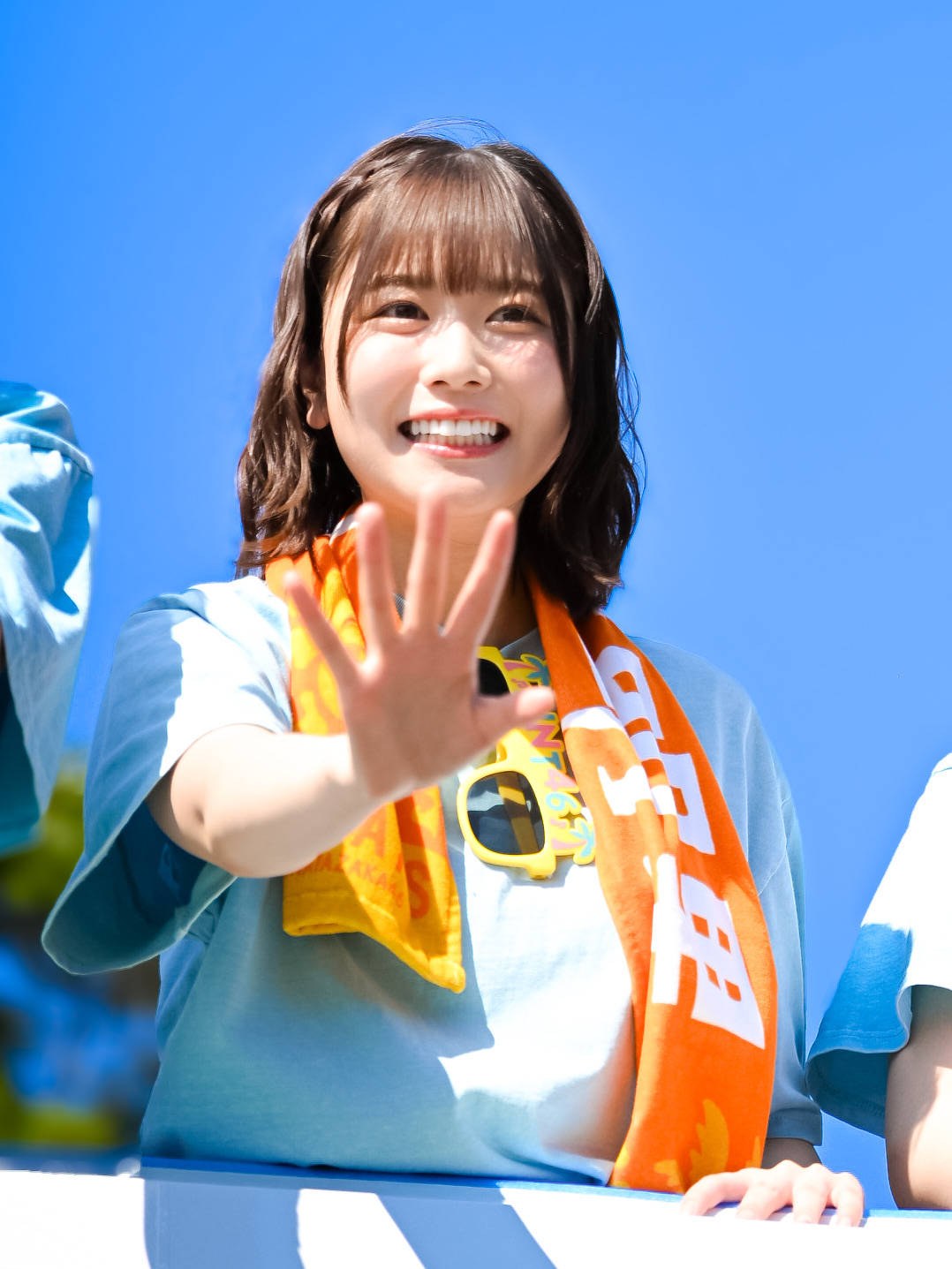
- Nibu in September 2024
- Born: February 15, 2001 (age 25); Tochigi Prefecture, Japan
- Occupations: YouTuber; radio personality; actress
- Years active: 2017–present
- Agent: Seed & Flower

YouTube information
- Channel: Nibu-channel
- Years active: 2025–present
- Genre: video game
- Subscribers: 110,000
- Views: 10,545,995
- Last updated: 11 May 2026
- Musical career
- Origin: Saitama Prefecture, Japan
- Genre: J-pop
- Years active: 2017–2024
- Label: Sony Music Entertainment Japan
- Formerly of: Hinatazaka46
- Website: Official website

Akari Nibu (Japanese: 丹生 明里, Hepburn: Nibu Akari; born February 15, 2001) is a Japanese YouTuber, radio personality, and actress, represented by Seed & Flower. Focusing on video games and anime, she often appears in gaming-related events and television shows and was a voice actress for Deemo: Memorial Keys (2021).

Nibu began her career as a member of the girl group Hinatazaka46 (formerly Hiragana Keyakizaka46) from 2017 to 2024, and was the lead performer of the group's single "One Choice" (2023). She also hosts Akari Nibu Happy Caravan on TBS Radio.

== Early life ==
Nibu was born in Tochigi Prefecture and has two older brothers. She lived in Gunma Prefecture as a child before moving to Saitama Prefecture. She holds a third dan rank in kendo and took part in prefectural tournaments when she was in middle school.

== Career ==
=== 2017–2019: Early career ===
Nibu considered becoming an idol after listening to the Keyakizaka46 song "Silent Majority" and joined the audition for Hiragana Keyakizaka46, the subgroup of Keyakizaka46. She passed the auditions on August 13, 2017, and was publicly introduced two days later as a second generation member of Hiragana Keyakizaka46, which was spun off and rebranded into Hinatazaka46 in February 2019.

Nibu is a fan of shōnen manga, particularly Dragon Ball and The Promised Neverland. In 2018, she guested in an Animax special feature to commemorate the release of Dragon Ball Super: Broly.

=== 2020–2022: Ventures into acting, gaming ===
Nibu and fellow Hinatazaka46 members Miku Kanemura and Miho Watanabe were voice actresses for the animated miniseries adaptation of the character Pickles the Frog, aired in October 2020. In November 2020, the three of them were inducted into the Saitama Support Group (also known as Kobaton Club), a community of entertainers from Saitama Prefecture tasked with promoting the region in the media. She played a supporting role in the Hinatazaka46 drama series Dasada (2020) and co-starred in Koeharu! (2021).

Nibu made her feature film voice acting debut in 2021's Deemo: Memorial Keys. Despite her inexperience, executive director Junichi Fujisaku remarked that he treated her "equally" to the other voice actors, while co-star Ayana Taketatsu commented that her performance did not "feel like that of a first-timer". Nibu herself cited Koeharu!, in which she portrayed an aspiring voice actress, as an influence; Koichi Yamadera, who portrayed the school principal in that drama, was also part of the Deemo cast.

Minna no Mameo

Images
- Mameo at Manga Ōkoku

Video
- Minna no Mameo playlist on YouTube

In April 2022, Nibu became the voice of main character Mami in the animated shorts miniseries (four minutes per episode) Minna no Mameo (みんなのまめお; lit. 'Everyone's Mameo'), aired as a segment of the TV Asahi variety show Onegai! Ranking (お願い!ランキング) and also released on YouTube. It was based on a one-shot manga titled Mameo, with original concept by her and written and illustrated by mangaka Kengo Kurando in May 2021 on the variety show Manga Michi (まんが未知) on the same network.

Nibu's first photobook was released on July 26, 2022, published by Gentosha. Titled Yasashī Kankei (やさしい関係; lit. 'Gentle Relationship'), the photos were taken throughout 2021, with summer pictures taken in the Setouchi region and winter pictures in the Aomori Prefecture. The book sold 46,000 copies in its release week and placed first on the weekly Oricon photobook chart and second on the general book chart.

Nibu is an avid gamer and has guested in events such as the "Sony Creative Cup featuring Fortnite" and participated in "The Gaming Days Valorant Series", a competitive gaming event between entertainers and professional gamers, in 2022. She co-hosted the esports show Choten on TV Tokyo and is a recurring guest on Hiroiki Ariyoshi's gaming show Ariyoshieeeee!

=== 2023–2024: Live-action feature film debut, Hinatazaka46 center and departure ===
Nibu served as the title song center (lead performer) for Hinatazaka46's ninth single "One Choice", released on April 19, 2023.

Nibu's first two live-action feature films are the 2024 Shinji Muroi duology, continuations of the long-running Bayside Shakedown detective series. Producer Chihiro Kameyama and screenwriter Ryoichi Kimizuka considered casting her after watching her appearances on a video gaming television show, while director Katsuyuki Motohiro remarked that her experience as an idol contributed to her "nuanced" performance and ability to respond well to his "interesting" direction.

Merchandise display at Nibu's "graduation" ceremony.

On August 6, 2024, Nibu, along with Shiho Katō, Mei Higashimura, and Hiyori Hamagishi, announced that she would leave Hinatazaka46 after the promotional cycle for the 12th single, which would be released on September 18. She cited persistent low back pain, which she had endured since 2021, as the reason. Her "graduation" ceremony took place over two days at the Pia Arena MM, with a competitive gaming event, or "Game Day", on November 30, featuring professional esports teams Zeta Division and Crazy Raccoon, and a concert on December 1, the "Live Day". While the first day was not live-streamed, the group performed two songs relayed live from the venue as part of Nippon TV's Best Artist 2024 music program, which also became Nibu's final music performance with the group on terrestrial television. Her final concert with the group was on December 26 at the Tokyo Dome, the final leg of that year's national "Happy Magical Tour".

=== 2025–present: Solo career ===
Nibu remained with Hinatazaka46's management agency, Seed & Flower, after her departure. In April 2025, she launched her official website and YouTube channel, primarily focused on gaming. She also started her solo radio program, Akari Nibu Happy Caravan, on TBS Radio the same month.

Nibu starred in the stage play Hula Girls: Dance for Smile from May 22 to June 2, 2025. She played the lead role in Steal the Voice! (声を盗れ!), an intermission drama miniseries for the live sketch comedy show "Conton vol.8", performed on February 12–15, 2026 at the Tokyo Sōgetsu Hall and featuring fellow former Hinatazaka46 member Miho Watanabe.

== Personal life ==
Nibu is a fan of Aimyon. She has attended Aimyon's concert and received a signed album from her.

== Discography ==
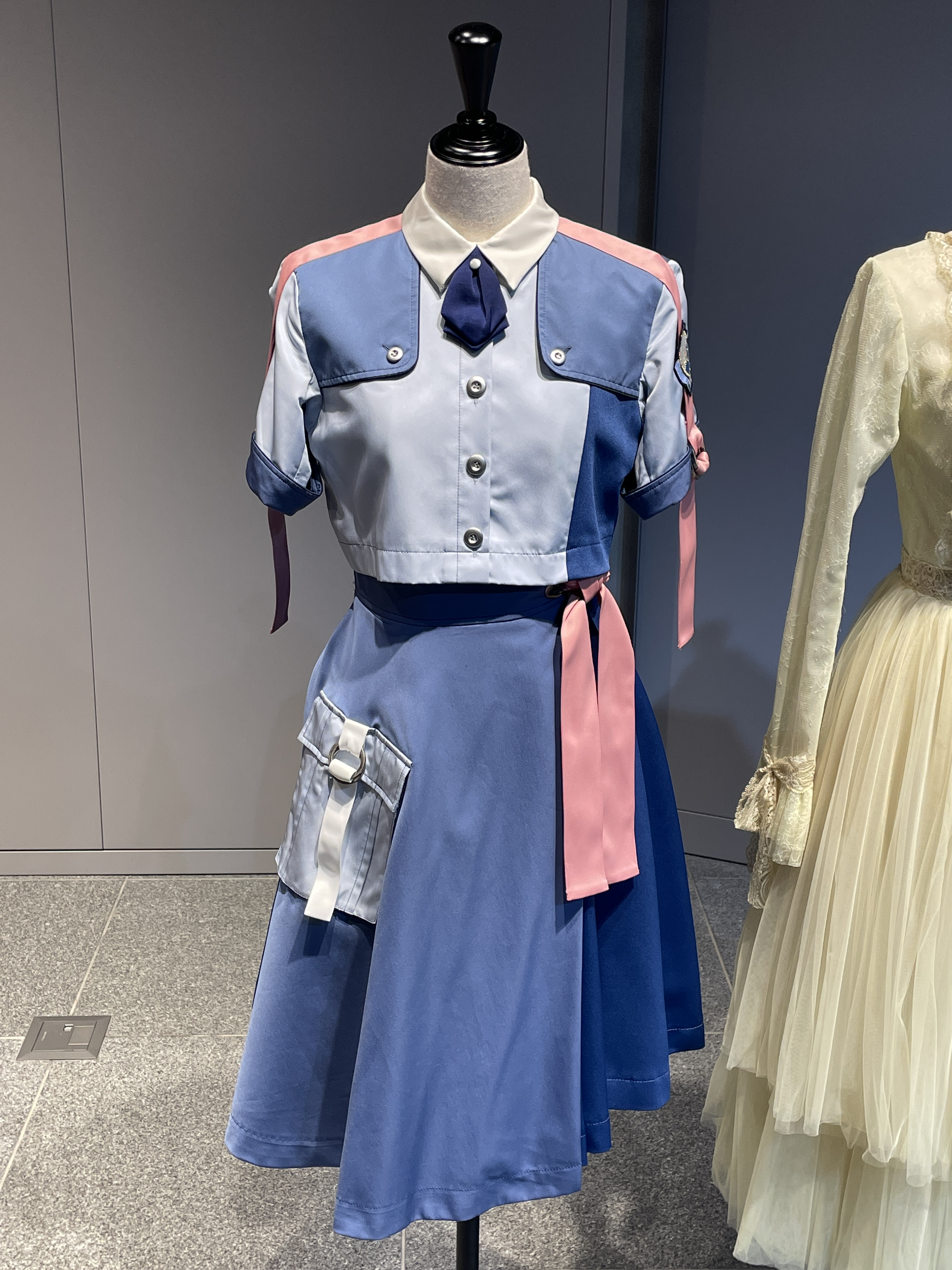
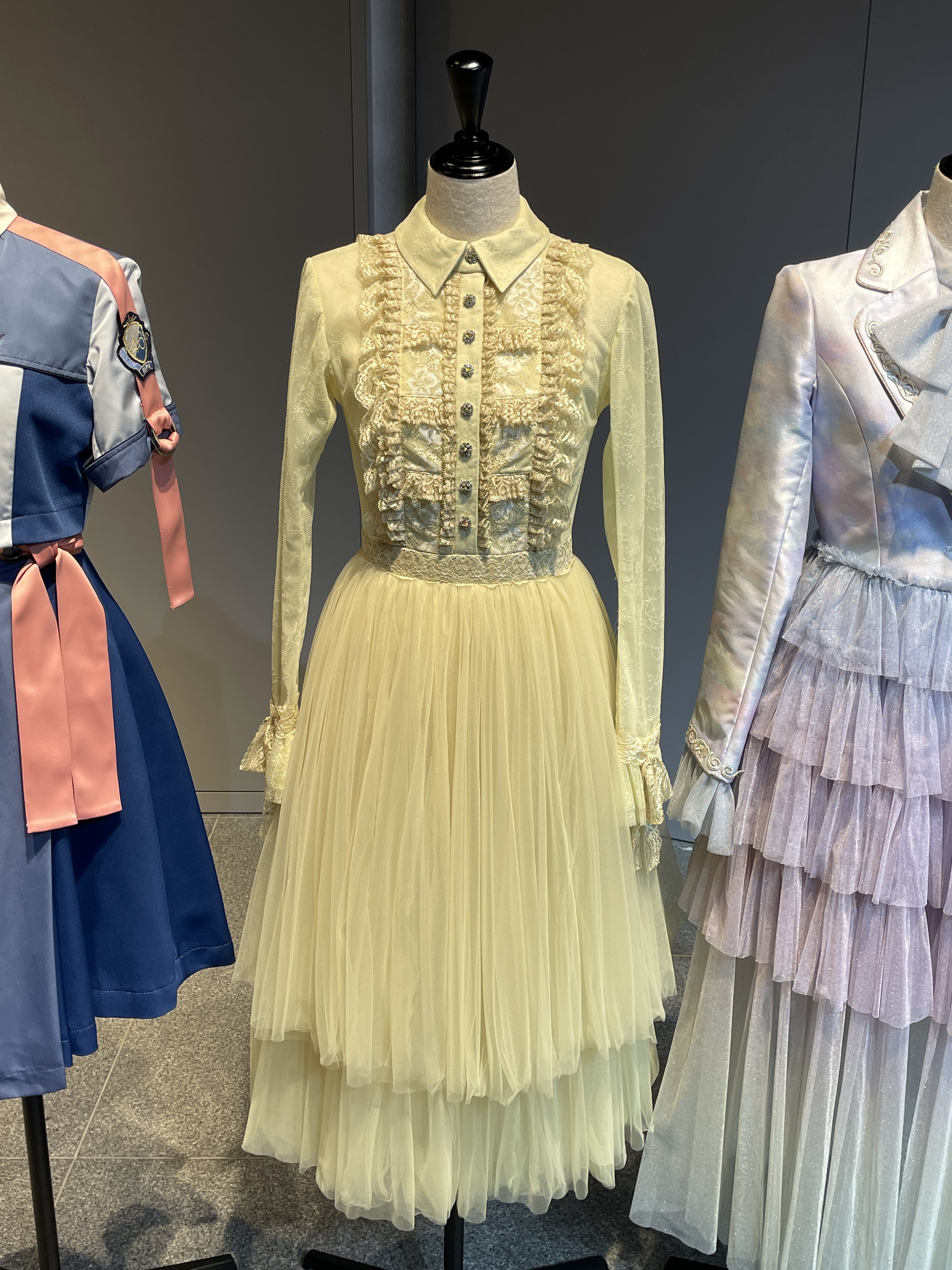
Nibu's costumes for the "Do Re Mi Sol La Si Do" (2019) music video, "One Choice" (2023) music video, and a "One Choice" year-end live performance.

Nibu has participated in all Hinatazaka46 title songs and was the center (lead performer) for their ninth single, "One Choice" (2023). Other notable appearances include:

- "Kirei ni Naritai" (Hashiridasu Shunkan, 2018), as a trio with Nao Kosaka and Miho Watanabe
- "Cage" ("Do Re Mi Sol La Si Do" B-side, 2019), co-center with Mei Higashimura, performed with Miku Kanemura and Hina Kawata as the Yancharu Family
- "Kimi no Tame Nani ga Dekiru Darō" ("Sonna Koto Nai yo" B-side, 2020), center
- "Koe no Ashiato" ("Kimi Shika Katan" B-side, 2021), Koeharu! theme song, co-center with Mirei Sasaki
- "Akubi Letter" ("Tteka" B-side, 2021), with Miku Kanemura and Miho Watanabe as Color Chart

== Filmography ==
=== Film ===
| Date | Title | Role | Notes | Ref(s) |
|---|---|---|---|---|
| 2022 | Deemo: Memorial Keys | Masked Lady (voice) | | |
| 2024 | Shinji Muroi: Not Defeated | Sayaka Okawa | | |
| 2024 | Shinji Muroi: Stay Alive | Sayaka Okawa | | |

=== Television ===
| Year | Title | Role | Notes | Ref(s) |
|---|---|---|---|---|
| 2017 | Re:Mind | Akari Nibu | Episode 13 | |
| 2020 | Dasada | Kurumi Harusawa | | |
| 2020 | Pickles the Frog – Color of Feelings (Note: かえるのピクルス - きもちのいろ -) | Akari (voice) | | |
| 2021 | Koeharu! (Note: 声春っ!) | Mana Tendō | Lead role | |
| 2022–2023 | Minna no Mameo (Note: みんなのまめお; lit. 'Everyone's Mameo') | Mami (voice) | Nibu co-wrote the draft; series aired as a segment in Onegai! Ranking on TV Asahi and also published on YouTube | |
| 2026 | Game Change | Moeko Inuyama | | |
| 2026 | Tokyo PD | Mikie Minowa | Season 2, streaming exclusive only on FOD | |

==== Variety and talk shows ====
| Year | Name | Role | Notes | Ref(s) |
|---|---|---|---|---|
| 2018 | Ora-tachi's Dragon Ball Lecture | Guest | Special feature | |
| 2020–present | Ariyoshieeeee! (Note: 有吉ぃぃeeeee!) | Recurring guest | | |
| 2021 | Choten (Note: CHOTeN 〜今週、誰を予想する?〜) | Co-host | | |

== Other appearances ==
=== Theater ===
| Year | Title | Role(s) | Venue | Notes | Ref(s) |
|---|---|---|---|---|---|
| 2018 | Ayumi | Various | AiiA 2.5 Theater Tokyo | | |
| 2018 | Magia Record | Madoka Kaname | Akasaka ACT Theater | | |
| 2025 | Hula Girls: Dance for Smile | Kimiko Tanigawa | New National Theatre Tokyo | Lead role | |

=== Radio ===
| Year | Title | Role | Network | Ref(s) |
|---|---|---|---|---|
| 2020–2024 | Belc presents Hinatazaka46 no Yokei na Koto made Yarimashō (Note: ベルク presents 日向坂46の余計な事までやりましょう; transl. Let's Do Extra Things) | Host | Tokyo FM | |
| 2025–present | Nibu Akari Happy Caravan | Host | TBS Radio | |

== Bibliography ==
| Release date | Title | Publisher | ISBN | Remarks |
|---|---|---|---|---|
| 2021 | Mameo | Manga Kingdom; Ganma | | One-shot web manga; drafted by Nibu, drawn by Kengo Kurando |
| July 26, 2022 | Yasashii Kankei (やさしい関係; lit. 'Gentle Relationship') | Gentosha | ISBN 978-4344039902 | Photobook |
