= Sonna Koto Nai yo =

2020 single by Hinatazaka46

- Type A cover, featuring Miku Kanemura, Nao Kosaka, and Mei Higashimura

Single by Hinatazaka46

from the album Hinatazaka
- English title: That's Not True
- B-side: "Seishun no Uma"; "Suki to Iu Koto wa…" (Type-A); "Mado o Akenakute mo" (Type-B); "Naze-" (Type-C); "Kimi no Tamenani ga Dekiru Darō" (Regular)
- Released: February 19, 2020
- Genre: J-pop
- Length: 4:45
- Label: Sony Music Entertainment Japan
- Producer: Yasushi Akimoto

Hinatazaka46 singles chronology
"Konna ni Suki ni Natchatte Ii no?" (2019)	"Sonna Koto Nai yo" (2020)	"Kimi Shika Katan" (2021)

Music video
- "Sonna Koto Nai yo" on YouTube
- "Seishun no Uma" on YouTube

"Sonna Koto Nai yo" (Japanese: ソンナコトナイヨ; lit. 'That's Not True') is the 4th single by Japanese idol group Hinatazaka46. It was released on February 19, 2020 through Sony Music Entertainment Japan. The title track featured Nao Kosaka as center, marking her fourth consecutive appearance at this position.

== Release ==
The single was released in four versions: Type-A, Type-B, Type-C and a regular edition.

For the bonus Blu-ray content, the members competed against each other in a Daifugō tournament.

The songs "Seishun no Uma" and "Naze" are used in the opening and closing theme, respectively, of the television show Dasada, which casts all members of Hinatazaka46. "Seishun no Uma" was debuted unusually early before the title track on January 11, where it was performed live at a Tokyo Girls Collection event in Shizuoka.

== Reception ==
Songwriter Junji Ishiwatari positively commented on the expressions used in the lyrics to describe the singer's love interest, such as comparing her bangs to the art style of Yoshitomo Nara.

== Track listing ==
All lyrics written by Yasushi Akimoto.

=== Type-A ===
CD
No.	Title	Length
1.	"Sonna Koto Nai yo" (ソンナコトナイヨ)	4:45
2.	"Seishun no Uma" (青春の馬)	5:06
3.	"Suki to Iu Koto wa…" (好きということは…)	4:28
4.	"Sonna Koto Nai yo" (off vocal ver.)	4:45
5.	"Seishun no Uma" (off vocal ver.)	5:06
6.	"Suki to Iu Koto wa…" (off vocal ver.)	4:27
Total length:		28:37

Blu-ray
No.	Title	Length
1.	"Sonna Koto Nai yo" (music video)	4:55
2.	"Seishun no Uma" (music video)	5:19
3.	"Hinatazaka46 President No.1 Decisive battle" (Qualifying 〜First part〜)	60:05
Total length:		70:19

=== Type-B ===
CD
No.	Title	Length
1.	"Sonna Koto Nai yo" (ソンナコトナイヨ)	4:45
2.	"Seishun no Uma" (青春の馬)	5:06
3.	"Mado o Akenakute mo" (窓を開けなくても)	4:14
4.	"Sonna Koto Nai yo" (off vocal ver.)	4:45
5.	"Seishun no Uma" (off vocal ver.)	5:06
6.	"Mado o Akenakute mo" (off vocal ver.)	4:13
Total length:		28:09

Blu-ray
No.	Title	Length
1.	"Sonna Koto Nai yo" (music video)	4:55
2.	"Mado o Akenakute mo" (music video)	4:25
3.	"Hinatazaka46 President No.1 Decisive battle" (Qualifying 〜Second part〜)	44:20
Total length:		53:40

=== Type-C ===
CD
No.	Title	Length
1.	"Sonna Koto Nai yo" (ソンナコトナイヨ)	4:45
2.	"Seishun no Uma" (青春の馬)	5:06
3.	"Naze-" (ナゼー)	4:14
4.	"Sonna Koto Nai yo" (off vocal ver.)	4:45
5.	"Seishun no Uma" (off vocal ver.)	5:06
6.	"Naze-" (off vocal ver.)	4:13
Total length:		28:09

Blu-ray
No.	Title	Length
1.	"Sonna Koto Nai yo" (music video)	4:55
2.	"Naze-" (music video)	4:23
3.	"Hinatazaka46 President No.1 Decisive battle" (Final game & Reward recording)	50:46
Total length:		60:04

=== Regular Edition ===
CD
No.	Title	Length
1.	"Sonna Koto Nai yo" (ソンナコトナイヨ)	4:45
2.	"Seishun no Uma" (青春の馬)	5:06
3.	"Kimi no Tame Nani ga Dekiru Darō" (君のため何ができるだろう)	4:57
4.	"Sonna Koto Nai yo" (off vocal ver.)	4:45
5.	"Seishun no Uma" (off vocal ver.)	5:06
6.	"Kimi no Tame Nani ga Dekiru Darō" (off vocal ver.)	4:56
Total length:		29:35

== Personnel ==
=== "Sonna Koto Nai yo" ===
Center: Nao Kosaka

- 1st row: Kyōko Saitō, Miku Kanemura, Nao Kosaka, Mei Higashimura, Shiho Katō
- 2nd row: Sarina Ushio, Miho Watanabe, Akari Nibu, Hina Kawata, Konoka Matsuda, Suzuka Tomita
- 3rd row: Kumi Sasaki, Hiyori Hamagishi, Ayaka Takamoto, Hinano Kamimura, Mana Takase, Manamo Miyata, Mirei Sasaki

=== "Seishun no Uma" ===
Center: Nao Kosaka

Sarina Ushio, Shiho Katō, Kyōko Saitō, Kumi Sasaki, Mirei Sasaki, Mana Takase, Ayaka Takamoto, Mei Higashimura, Miku Kanemura, Hina Kawata, Nao Kosaka, Suzuka Tomita, Akari Nibu, Hiyori Hamagishi, Konoka Matsuda, Manamo Miyata, Miho Watanabe, Hinano Kamimura

=== "Suki to Iu Koto wa…" ===
Center: Mirei Sasaki

Sarina Ushio, Shiho Katō, Kyōko Saitō, Kumi Sasaki, Mirei Sasaki, Mana Takase, Ayaka Takamoto, Mei Higashimura

=== "Mado o Akenakute mo" ===
Shiho Katō, Kyōko Saitō, Kumi Sasaki, Mirei Sasaki, Nao Kosaka, Suzuka Tomita, Miho Watanabe

=== "Naze-" ===
Mei Higashimura, Hina Kawata, Konoka Matsuda

=== "Kimi no Tame Nani ga Dekiru Darō" ===
Center: Akari Nibu

Miku Kanemura, Hina Kawata, Nao Kosaka, Suzuka Tomita, Akari Nibu, Hiyori Hamagishi, Konoka Matsuda, Manamo Miyata, Miho Watanabe, Hinano Kamimura

== Charts ==
=== Weekly charts ===
Chart (2020)	Peak position	First week sales
Japan (Japan Hot 100)	1	556,724
Japan (Oricon)	1	558,000

=== Year-end charts ===
Chart (2020)	Position
Japan (Japan Hot 100)	61
