= Dasada (TV series) =

2020 Japanese television series

- Developed by: Yasushi Akimoto
- Screenplay by: Erika Yoshida
- Directed by: Hayato Kawai; Ryō Nishimura
- Starring: Hinatazaka46
- Opening theme: "Seishun no Uma"
- Country of origin: Japan
- Original language: Japanese
- No. of episodes: 10

Production
- Producers: Kazue San'nōmaru; Takahisa Mizuta; Hirofumi Itō
- Running time: 30 minutes

Original release
- Network: Nippon TV
- Release: 16 January – 19 March 2020

Dasada (stylized in all-caps) is a Japanese television series starring members of the idol group Hinatazaka46. The show aired on Nippon TV at 1:00 AM to 1:30 AM on Thursdays, and is available on Hulu Japan after it finished airing. The series is the second television drama series starring Hinatazaka46, after Re:Mind.

== Plot ==
High school student Yuria Sada finds out that her parents are at risk of losing their dressmaking shop to debt collectors unless they can repay their 10 million yen debt within six months. Teaming up with fellow classmate and aspiring fashion designer Saori Shinohara, Yuria launches a clothing brand named "Dasada" to repay the debt. Along the way, Saori becomes acquainted with Ochoko, her role model and leader of the girl group Factory, and is forced to face the realities of being a creative professional.

== Cast ==
All active members of Hinatazaka46 make an appearance in the series (Yūka Kageyama and Hiyori Hamagishi were on hiatus during production and did not appear). Major roles include:

- Nao Kosaka as Yuria Sada (佐田ゆりあ): An airheaded second-year student who thinks she looks very cute. Her family owns the Sada Dressmaking Shop.
- Miho Watanabe as Saori Shinohara (篠原沙織): A second-year student in the same class as Yuria. She becomes the designer of Dasada's clothes.
- Kyōko Saitō as Makoto Ogasawara (小笠原真琴): A third-year student and the volleyball club president.
- Shiho Katō as Serena Takatō (高頭せれな): A third-year student who also works as a model under the stage name Serenadé, which makes her popular among her peers.
- Mirei Sasaki as Ichigo Okada (岡田いちご): A second-year student in the same class as Yuria. Her sister Tororo, played by Mao Iguchi, is a gravure idol.
- Kumi Sasaki as Yuriko Tachibana (立花ゆりこ): A second-year student and Yuria's childhood friend.
- Suzuka Tomita as Nanao Hataya (畑屋菜々緒): A second-year student and Yuria's childhood friend.
- Members of the idol group Factory
  - Mei Higashimura as Guinomi (ぐいのみ)
  - Konoka Matsuda as Ochoko (おちょこ)
  - Hina Kawata as Tokkrin (トックリン)

Former AKB48 member Yūka Tano appears as a volleyball club member.

== Production and release ==
The fashion brand Dasada was launched in real life and modeled by Hinatazaka46 members at the 30th Tokyo Girls Collection fashion show, held on 29 February 2020 at the Yoyogi National Gymnasium. Due to the COVID-19 pandemic, the fashion show was held via livestreaming only.

The opening theme song, "Seishun no Uma", and the song by in-universe group Factory, "Naze", are both included on Hinatazaka46's 4th single, "Sonna Koto Nai yo".

A re-run of the series with audio commentary by the cast, titled Dasada: Mirai e no Countdown (DASADA〜未来へのカウントダウン〜; lit. 'Dasada: Countdown to the Future'), was aired from July 2 to September 10.
