= Mirei Sasaki =

Japanese actress and media personality

- 佐々木 美玲
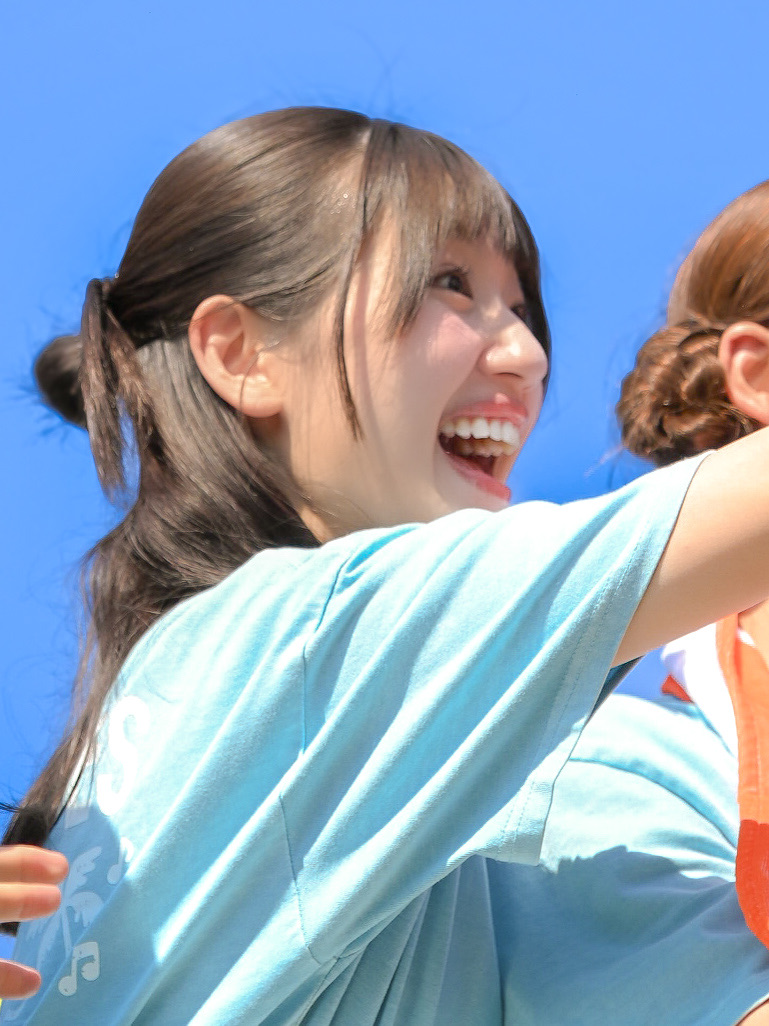
- Sasaki in September 2024
- Born: December 17, 1999 (age 26); Kanagawa Prefecture, Japan
- Occupations: Actress; media personality; singer
- Years active: 2013–present
- Musical career
- Origin: Hyōgo Prefecture, Japan
- Genre: J-pop
- Years active: 2013–2025; 2026–present
- Label: Sony
- Formerly of: Chocomilq (2013–2015); Hinatazaka46 (2016–2025)
- Modeling information
- Height: 164.9 cm (5 ft 5 in)
- Website: Official website

Mirei Sasaki (Japanese: 佐々木 美玲, Hepburn: Sasaki Mirei; born December 17, 1999) is a Japanese actress, media personality, and singer. She has appeared in dramas such as Women's Gourmet Burger Club (2020) and Kakegurui Twin (2021), and starred in Koeharu! (2021) and Piece of Cake! (2022). Her theater appearances include portraying Yor Forger in the first musical adaptation of Spy × Family (2023). She is also a lifestyle reporter for the Nippon TV morning show Zip!

Sasaki was a founding member of the girl group Hinatazaka46 (formerly Hiragana Keyakizaka46) from 2016 to 2025 and made her acting debut in the group's drama series Re:Mind (2017). She was the lead performer for "Kitai Shiteinai Jibun" from the album Hashiridasu Shunkan (2018) and "Azatokawaii" from Hinatazaka (2020). She was also an exclusive model for the fashion magazine Non-no from 2019 to 2025.

Since leaving Hinatazaka46, Sasaki has continued her acting career in We're Worse at Love Than Pandas and lead roles in Piece of Safe and The Night I Got Pregnant By the CEO (all 2026). She has also produced her own lifestyle brand Mireille and held her first solo concert in October 2026.

== Early life ==
Sasaki was born in Kanagawa Prefecture and raised in Hyōgo Prefecture. She lived in Taiwan for four years as a child and can speak Mandarin Chinese; she has revealed that she once appeared on Taiwanese news footage fleeing an earthquake "wearing only her underwear".

== Career ==
=== 2013−2018: Early career ===
In 2013, Sasaki became a founding member of the Osaka-based local idol group Chocomilq (stylized as choco☆milQ). She left the group on November 1, 2015.

In May 2016, Sasaki passed the auditions for new members of girl group Keyakizaka46's subgroup Hiragana Keyakizaka46 and joined the group as the "first generation". Her first concert was on October 28 at Akasaka Blitz, where she performed Keyakizaka46 songs "Silent Majority" and "Sekai ni wa Ai Shika Nai", as well as Hiragana Keyakizaka46's own "Hiragana Keyaki". She made her television acting debut in the group's drama series Re:Mind (2017) on TV Tokyo and Netflix, portraying a character named after herself, and theater debut in the group's stage play Ayumi (2018).

Sasaki served as center (lead performer) for the main song on Hiragana Keyakizaka46's debut album Hashiridasu Shunkan (2018), titled "Kitai Shitenai Jibun" (期待していない自分; lit. 'I Don't Expect Anything'). The album also included her solo song, "Wazukana Hikari" (わずかな光; lit. 'A Little Light').

=== 2019−2025: Hinatazaka46, expanding activities ===
Sasaki portrayed the main character in the music video of Aimer's "Hanabiratachi no March", released in January 2019. She started modelling work in earnest by becoming an exclusive model for the fashion magazine Non-no in February.

In February 2019, Hiragana Keyakizaka46 was spun off from Keyakizaka46 and rebranded into Hinatazaka46. Sasaki was one of five members representing Hinatazaka46 in "Hatsukoi Door" (初恋ドア; lit. 'First Love Door'), a collaboration track between the AKB48 Group and Sakamichi Series franchises released on the 2019 AKB48 single "Jiwaru Days". She again served as center for the main song of Hinatazaka46's first studio album (second since its founding as Hiragana Keyakizaka46) Hinatazaka (2020), "Azatokawaii" (アザトカワイイ; transl. "Cunningly Cute").

On September 18, 2019, Sasaki hosted the 2019 MTV Video Music Awards Japan along with fellow Hinatazaka46 members Kumi Sasaki, Nao Kosaka, and Miho Watanabe.

As a bread lover, Sasaki hosted her first self-titled special program Kaiten! Mīpan Bakery (開店!みーぱんベーカリー; lit. 'Open for Business! Mīpan Bakery') (2019) on TV Asahi CS 1. In April 2020, she became a regular lifestyle reporter for the "Kiterune!" (キテルネ！; transl. This is Trending!) segment of the long-running Nippon TV morning show, Zip! Her work in television acting continued with appearances in the TV Tokyo drama Japan Women's Gourmet Burger Club (女子グルメバーガー部) (2020) and as Mikura Sado in the live-action series adaptation of Kakegurui Twin (2021), as well as lead roles in the Hinatazaka46 drama Koeharu! (2021) and Piece of Cake (2022) on Nippon TV. She also starred in the 2023 stage adaptation of Piece of Cake and made her musical theater debut as she was double cast as Yor Forger in the first musical adaptation of best-selling manga Spy × Family.

Sasaki's first photobook, titled Hizashi no Parade (陽射しのパレード, Hizashi no Parēdo; lit. 'Sunshine Parade'), was published on December 17, 2024, her 25th birthday, by Shueisha (publisher of Non-no). It was primarily photographed in Da Nang, Vietnam, and made with the theme of "sparkling happiness". In an interview, Sasaki revealed that she previously had reservations about releasing a photobook, as she still felt "immature", but gradually changed her mind after seeing the "wonderful" works of her fellow members and wanted expressions that she could only make while still an idol to be captured. The book sold around 32,000 copies in its first week and topped the Oricon weekly photobook chart that week, and placed sixth on the Oricon 2025 first half-year photobook chart with around 41,800 copies sold.

On 6 January 2025, Sasaki and fellow first generation members Kumi Sasaki and Mana Takase announced that they would part ways with Hinatazaka46 after the promotional cycle for the upcoming 13th single, marking the end of the founding first generation's tenure in the group. Her "graduation" ceremony took place on April 6 at the Yokohama Stadium as part of the sixth Hinatansai anniversary concert.

=== 2025−present: Solo career ===
In June 2025, Non-no magazine announced that Sasaki would end her exclusive modeling contract after 6.5 years, with a final appearance in its September 2025 issue. On July 1, Sasaki announced that she had joined the Queen-B talent agency, which had also represented fellow former Hinatazaka46 member Miho Watanabe since 2022. She started a new radio program, Mirei Sasaki's Hapi Hapi! Happy Radio! (佐々木美玲のハピハピ！ハッピーラジオ！), on InterFM in September. She also launched the lifestyle goods brand Mireille, with limited-edition releases in 2025 and 2026.

In January 2026, the sequel to Piece of Cake, Piece of Safe, was announced, with Sasaki and the other cast members playing different characters. It would again include both a drama series and stage play; Nippon TV noted that all 17 performances of the previous stage play were sold out despite being shown during the COVID-19 pandemic. She also starred in the drama adaptation of the manga The Night I Got Pregnant By the CEO.

Sasaki became the second-generation "Butter Queen" brand ambassador for the Butter Queen cookie brand in September 2026, succeeding fellow former Hinatazaka46 member Manamo Miyata. On October 3, she launched her official YouTube channel and published a video of herself recording her original song, "Step by Skip", and she held her first solo concert, billed "Another Me", a week later on October 10 at the Nihonbashi Mitsui Hall in Tokyo, with fellow former Hinatazaka46 members Mei Higashimura and Suzuka Tomita as guests.

== Personal life ==
Sasaki owns two dogs and a cat, and all three have been featured in her works. In 2021, she revealed that she drank the medicinal liqueur Yōmeishu daily to improve her blood circulation. She enjoys fishing with her family and obtained a class 2 small boat operator's license in 2024, humorously remarking that she obtained it before having a driver's license.

== Filmography ==
=== Drama series ===
Sasaki's television drama series appearances
| Year | Title | Role | Notes | Ref(s) |
|---|---|---|---|---|
| 2017 | Re:Mind | Mirei Sasaki | | |
| 2020 | Dasada | Ichigo Okada | | |
| 2020 | Japan Women's Gourmet Burger Club | Emi Moribayashi | | |
| 2021 | Kakegurui Twin | Mikura Sado | | |
| 2021 | Koeharu! | Meiko Hinowa | Lead role | |
| 2022 | Piece of Cake | Nao Nakamura | Lead role | |
| 2026 | We're Worse at Love Than Pandas | Rina Takagi | | |
| 2026 | Piece of Safe | Megumi Haibara | Lead role | |
| 2026 | The Night I Got Pregnant By the CEO | Shiori Hanai | Lead role | |
| 2026 | Doubt | Mizuki Kamisaka | | |

=== Variety and talk shows ===
Sasaki's variety and talk show appearances
| Year | Title | Role | Notes | Ref(s) |
|---|---|---|---|---|
| 2019 | Kaiten! Mīpan Bakery | Host | | |
| 2020–present | ZIP! | Regular reporter for lifestyle segment | | |

=== Music video ===
Sasaki's appearances in other artists' music videos
| Year | Artist | Title | Notes | Ref(s) |
|---|---|---|---|---|
| 2019 | Aimer | "Hanabiratachi no March" | Main role | |

== Theater ==
Sasaki's stage play appearances
| Year | Title | Role(s) | Venue(s) | Notes | Ref(s) |
|---|---|---|---|---|---|
| 2018 | Ayumi | Various | AiiA 2.5 Theater Tokyo | Part of Team Castanets | |
| 2018 | Magia Record | Nanami Yachiyo | Akasaka ACT Theater | | |
| 2023 | Piece of Cake | Nao Nakamura | Tennōzu Galaxy Theater | Lead role | |
| 2023 | Spy × Family | Yor Forger | Imperial Theater, Hyogo Performing Arts Center, Hakata-za | Lead role | |
| 2026 | Piece of Safe | Megumi Haibara | | Lead role | |

== Discography ==
=== Digital single ===
Music videos
- "Step By Skip" on YouTube

Sasaki's digital singles
| Year | Title | Peak chart positions | Notes | Ref(s) |
| Year | Title | JPN Oricon | Notes | Ref(s) |
|---|---|---|---|---|
| 2026 | "Step by Skip" | TBA | | |

=== Hiragana Keyakizaka46/Hinatazaka46 ===
"Kitai Shiteinai Jibun" (2018) music video

"Azatokawaii" performance in the 71st NHK Kōhaku Uta Gassen (2020)

Several of Sasaki's costumes

The following are Sasaki's notable contributions to Hiragana Keyakizaka46 and Hinatazaka46 discography.

- "Kitai Shitenai Jibun" (期待していない自分; lit. 'I Don't Expect Anything') (2018, main song of Hashiridasu Shunkan), center (lead performer)
- "Wazukana Hikari" (わずかな光; lit. 'A Little Light') (2018, released on Hashiridasu Shunkan), solo song
- "Azatokawaii" (アザトカワイイ; transl. "Cunningly Cute") (2020, main song of Hinatazaka), center
- "Koe no Ashiato" (声の足跡; lit. 'Voice Footprints') (2021, released on "Kimi Shika Katan"), double center with Akari Nibu, Koeharu! theme song
- "Suppai Jiko Ken'o" (酸っぱい自己嫌悪; lit. 'Sour Self-loathing') (2021, released on "Tteka"), unit track with Hina Kawata, Hiyori Hamagishi, and Haruyo Yamaguchi (Mi-pan Family)
- "10-byō Tenshi" (10秒天使; lit. '10-second Angel') (2022, "Tsuki to Hoshi ga Odoru Midnight" B-side), performed with Mei Higashimura, Hina Kawata, and Konoka Matsuda

=== Collaboration ===
- "Hatsukoi Door" (初恋ドア; lit. 'First Love Door') (2019, released on "Jiwaru Days"), collaboration between Sakamichi Series and AKB48 Group

== Radio ==
Sasaki's television drama series appearances
| Year | Title | Role | Network | Notes | Ref(s) |
|---|---|---|---|---|---|
| 2021–2022 | Dragon Quest of the Stars presents Hinatazaka46 Mirei Sasaki's Hoimīpan (星のドラゴンクエスト presents 日向坂46 佐々木美玲のホイミーぱん) (Note: Hoimi is a healing spell from the Dragon Quest game series, referring to the program's sponsor, the now-discontinued mobile game Dragon Quest of the Stars; Mīpan is Sasaki's nickname.) | Host (originally substituting for Nao Kosaka) | Tokyo FM | Formerly Dragon Quest of the Stars presents Hinatazaka46 Nao Kosaka's Kosaka-na Radio (星のドラゴンクエスト presents 日向坂46 小坂菜緒の「小坂なラジオ」) | |
| 2022–2025 | Lawson presents Hinatazaka46 no Hotto Hitoiki! (ローソン presents 日向坂46のほっとひといき!) | Host (alternating with Suzuka Tomita and Hina Kawata) | Tokyo FM | | |
| 2025–present | Mirei Sasaki's Hapi Hapi! Happy Radio! (佐々木美玲のハピハピ！ハッピーラジオ！) | Host | InterFM | | |

== Bibliography ==
- Hizashi no Parade (陽射しのパレード, Hizashi no Parēdo; lit. 'Sunshine Parade') (2024, photobook), Shueisha, ISBN 978-4-08-790181-8
