= Hiyori Hamagishi =

Japanese actress (born 2002)

- 濱岸 ひより
- Hamagishi in 2024
- Born: September 28, 2002 (age 24); Fukuoka Prefecture, Japan
- Occupation: Actress
- Years active: 2017–present
- Agent: Horipro
- Height: 167.5 cm (5 ft 6 in)
- Musical career
- Genre: J-pop
- Instrument: Vocals
- Years active: 2017–2024
- Label: Sony
- Formerly of: Hinatazaka46
- Website: Official website

Hiyori Hamagishi (Japanese: 濱岸 ひより, Hepburn: Hamagishi Hiyori; born September 28, 2002) is a Japanese actress. She is represented by Horipro and has appeared in the stage adaptation of the anime Odd Taxi (2023) and the drama series Therapy Game (2025) and Yukari-kun's Unfair Gap (2026).

Hamagishi began her career as a member of the girl group Hinatazaka46 (formerly Hiragana Keyakizaka46) from 2017 to 2024. Aside from participating in the group's music releases, she appeared in the television drama series Borderless (2021) and the group's Koeharu! (2021). She became an exclusive model for the fashion magazines With in 2021 and andGIRL in 2023, and released her first best-selling photobook before leaving the group in late 2024. She joined Horipro in May 2025 to pursue an acting career.

== Early life ==
Hamagishi was born and raised in Fukuoka Prefecture. She practiced classical ballet from the age of three and had aspired to become a ballet teacher until entering the entertainment industry. Influenced by her mother, she is an avid fan of the all-female theater troupe Takarazuka Revue and has visited the Takarazuka Grand Theater.

== Career ==
=== 2017–2024: Hinatazaka46 ===
Hamagishi's Hiragana Keyakizaka46 training bib and uniform.

On August 13, 2017, Hamagishi joined the girl group Hiragana Keyakizaka46, now Hinatazaka46, as a second generation member, and was officially revealed on August 15. She had joined the auditions due to her admiration of founding member Neru Nagahama. She and fellow member Hina Kawata were particularly considered an "inseparable pair" and were noted to have adopted similar speech patterns.

On June 21, 2019, Hamagishi announced a hiatus due to health reasons, and she did not participate in Hinatazaka46's third single released later that year. She returned to public activities on January 7, 2020, joining promotional activities for the group's fourth single, and officially returned to the stage during the Hinatazaka46 × DASADA Live & Fashion Show at Yokohama Arena on February 4 and 5, 2020.

In 2021, Hamagishi made her television drama debut in the Sakamichi Series collaboration drama Borderless, portraying visually impaired karateka Kei Yatsuji. She appeared in the Hinatazaka46 drama Koeharu! (2021) and its live show as the leader of Chocola Shocola, a music group performing metal-style songs "reminiscent of X Japan and Babymetal", of which Kawata portrayed another member; Real Sound regarded her as a standout singer among the second-generation members, describing her voice as "alluring" and "emotional". She and Kawata also performed together in Hinatazaka46's singing unit Mī-pan Family, led by Mirei Sasaki (Mī-pan) as the "mother figure", in which Hamagishi was depicted as the "eldest daughter", despite being a year younger than Kawata. She expanded her activities into professional modeling as she became an exclusive model for Kodansha's fashion magazine With and made her first appearance in the November 2021 issue, released on her 19th birthday.

In early 2023, Hamagishi made her stage debut independent of the group as Sakura Wadagaki in the stage adaptation of the anime Odd Taxi, titled Odd Taxi: Diamonds Will Not Be Damaged. Shortly after, on March 7, 2023, she became a regular model for the fashion magazine andGIRL, published by Donuts and distributed by Shufunotomo, debuting in its spring issue.

On August 6, 2024, Hamagishi, along with Shiho Katō, Mei Higashimura, and Akari Nibu, announced that she would leave Hinatazaka46 following the promotional cycle of their 12th single, "Zettaiteki Dairokkan". She released her first photobook, titled Moshimo (もしも; lit. 'What If'), published by Donuts and distributed by Shufunotomo, on December 3. Shot in her hometown in Fukuoka Prefecture and Saipan, Northern Mariana Islands, the book has been called the "culmination" of her modeling career. It sold nearly 18,000 copies in its release week and topped the week's Oricon Weekly Photobook Chart.

Hamagishi's "graduation" ceremony was held on December 5, 2024, during Hinatazaka46's Happy Magical Tour 2024 stop at the Marine Messe Fukuoka. She made a surprise last appearance with the group in the final leg of the tour at the Tokyo Dome on December 26.

=== 2025–present: Solo career ===
Following her departure from Hinatazaka46, Hamagishi announced her affiliation with the talent agency Horipro on May 1, 2025, and launched her official fan club, "HiyoLab". Later that year, she appeared in more television dramas, landing a regular supporting role as Yuna Kukita in the MBS late-night drama Koi Fre: Koi-hito Miman ga Chōdo Ii and in the Nippon TV series adaptation of the manga Therapy Game. In February 2026, she portrayed announcer Sumire Maki in the TV drama Yukari-kun's Unfair Gap on Tokyo MX, co-starring with fellow former Hinatazaka46 member Miho Watanabe.

== Filmography ==
=== Drama series ===
Year	Title	Role	Notes	Ref(s)
2021	Borderless	Kei Yatsuji	Ensemble cast	
2021	Koeharu!	Azuki		
2023	Imikowa Kōsatsu Mystery: Bukimi na Kotae	Mizuki Kanzaki	Main role (3 episodes)	
2025	Koi Fre: Koibito Miman ga Chōdo Ii	Yuina Kukita		
2025	Therapy Game	Yuka		
2026	Yukari-kun's Unfair Gap	Sumire Maki		

== Theater ==
Year	Title	Role(s)	Venue(s)	Notes	Ref(s)
2018	Ayumi	Various	AiiA 2.5 Theater Tokyo	Part of Team Castanets	
2023	Odd Taxi: Diamonds Will Not Be Damaged	Sakura Wadagaki	Otemachi Mitsui Hall (Tokyo); Cool Japan Park Osaka (Osaka)		
2026	Keigo Higashino Theater Vol. 2: The Miracles of the Namiya General Store	Seri Mizuhara; Akiko Minazuki	Sunshine Theatre (Tokyo); Cool Japan Park Osaka (Osaka)	Cast as 2 characters	

== Discography ==
Hamagishi's costumes for "Warenai Shabondama" (2018) and "Seishun no Uma" (2020).

The following are Hamagishi's notable participation in Hiragana Keyakizaka46 and Hinatazaka46 discography.

- "No War in the Future" (2017, released on "Kaze ni Fukarete mo"), first song with Hiragana Keyakizaka46
- "Suppai Jiko Ken'o" (酸っぱい自己嫌悪; lit. 'Sour Self-loathing') (2021, released on "Tteka"), unit track with Mirei Sasaki, Hina Kawata, and Haruyo Yamaguchi (Mī-pan Family)
- "Mou Konna ni Suki ni Narenai" (もうこんなに好きになれない; lit. 'I Can't Love This Much Anymore') (2022, released on "Boku Nanka"), performed by all members born in 2002 (Hamagishi, Nao Kosaka, and Miku Kanemura)

=== Television original ===
- "Hell Rose" (2021), Koeharu! original song, performed in-universe as Chocola Shocola (Hamagishi, Hina Kawata, Mei Higashimura)

== Radio ==
Year	Title	Role	Network	Notes	Ref(s)
2025–present	Suki-more Me-seum	Host	Tokyo FM		

== Bibliography ==
- Moshimo (もしも; lit. 'What If') (2024) (photobook), published by Donuts, distributed by Shufunotomo, ISBN 9784073492405
