= Ichaicha Mushi =

- Digital edition cover, featuring a montage of all physical edition CD covers

Single by Hinatazaka46
- Released: September 30, 2026
- Genre: J-pop
- Label: Sony Music Labels
- Lyricist: Yasushi Akimoto
- Producer: Yasushi Akimoto

Hinatazaka46 singles chronology
"Kind of Love" (2026)	"Ichaicha Mushi" (2026)	"Archive" (2027)

Music video
- "Ichaicha Mushi" on YouTube
- "Kaze ni Kinmokusei" on YouTube
- "Soredemo Itsuka" on YouTube
- "Ichaicha Mushi" (choreography) on YouTube
- "Kaze ni Kinmokusei" (choreography) on YouTube

"Ichaicha Mushi" (Japanese: イチャイチャ虫; lit. 'Affectionate Bug') is the 18th single by Japanese idol group Hinatazaka46, released on September 30, 2026, by Sony Music Labels. It features fourth-generation member Yōko Shōgenji as the lead performer of the title track.

== Background and release ==
Hinatazaka46 announced its 18th single, titled "Ichaicha Mushi", on August 7, 2026. It is the group's first music release after the departure of Haruyo Yamaguchi. The 14-member main lineup (選抜, senbatsu; lit. 'selection') and formation for the title track were revealed on August 9 on the group's weekly television variety program Hinatazaka de Aimashō, with fourth-generation member Yōko Shōgenji serving as title song center (lead performer) for the third time, after 2024's "Kimi wa Honeydew" and "Zettaiteki Dairokkan", and Mitsuki Hiraoka and Yū Satō being selected for the first time. Four of the newest fifth-generation members, including Satō, joined the main lineup.

The unselected members formed the Hiragana Hinatazaka46 (ひなた坂46) lineup, with Rio Shimizu as center. Marie Morimoto, who would leave the group after the single's promotional cycle, became center for "Pink no Cosmos" and performed it with the members of the squad she formed in Hinatazaka de Aimashō, the travel-themed Morimoto Going-out Squad (森本連れ出し隊, Morimoto Tsuredashi-tai). Finally, Sumire Miyachi and Izuki Shimoda served as centers for the fourth and fifth-generation songs, respectively.

Art director Kumiko Takagi of ONPHA utilized the overall visual concept of "I am the protagonist of my story!" (わたしは、わたしの主人公！, Watashi wa, watashi no shujinkō!). The creative direction reflects how in a modern world overflowing with information and constant social evaluation, the members assert their individuality by spending time with the people who matter the most to them in simple, everyday moments. Dressed in the group's signature colors, they are posed against geometric architectural forms symbolizing the group's historical foundation, while the forward-facing block installations represent the future, with the members' expressions showing the passion of the "current" Hinatazaka46.

"Ichaicha Mushi" was performed live for the first time on September 20, 2026, during the group's performance in the Idol Runway Collection 2026 A/W fashion show at Yokohama Arena. The single was released on September 30, 2026, in five editions: Type A, Type B, Type C, Type D, and a regular edition. The four limited editions include a Blu-ray disc, while the regular edition contains a CD only.

== Music videos ==
The intact and battered props of Shōgenji's oversized heart.

The title track and its music video were released digitally on September 1, ahead of the physical release. It was choreographed by Rena of the dance collective RHT and the music video was directed by Yoshika Matsuoka, her second collaboration with the group after the "Cliffhanger" music video early that year. Filmed on Kodak's Vision3 500T 16 mm film, it depicts "overwhelming love" represented by heart-shaped items, with center Yōko Shōgenji, who carries an oversized heart, coming to realize the importance of loving herself as well as loving others. According to Shōgenji, the hearts carried by each member represent the different ways people express love, with hers getting more battered as her mind, represented by another version of herself in a large white room, loses control over her emotions. An alternate HinaRiha (ひなリハ; transl. HInata Rehearsal) music video showing the choreography in full was released on October 3.

The music video for "Soredemo Itsuka" was released on September 28. It was choreographed by CRE8BOY and directed by Asaya Hamada, who previously directed the music videos for "Kimi wa Honeydew" and "Zettaiteki Dairokkan". The singing scene was filmed with 55 members of the Inagakuen Public High School brass band club playing a live orchestra off-camera, in order to elicit genuine emotional expressions from the singers.

== Reception ==
"Ichaicha Mushi" debuted at the top of the daily Oricon Singles Chart with 371,000 copies sold. It topped the weekly Oricon Singles Chart with 442,000 copies sold, extending Hinatazaka46's records of "consecutive chart-topping singles" and "consecutive first-week single sales of over 300,000 copies" since debut to 18 releases; they tied for the latter with boy group King & Prince.

== Track listing ==
All lyrics are written by Yasushi Akimoto. Each edition contains the same first two tracks, with the third track and its instrumental version varying by edition.

Type A
No.	Title	Music	Length
1.	"Ichaicha Mushi" (イチャイチャ虫; lit. 'Affectionate Bug')	Tadashi Tsukida	4:09
2.	"Kaze ni Kinmokusei" (風にキンモクセイ; lit. 'Osmanthus in the Wind')	Yoichiro Nomura	5:04
3.	"Soredemo Itsuka" (それでもいつか; lit. 'Still, Someday')	2TROS	4:19
4.	"Ichaicha Mushi" (instrumental)	Tadashi Tsukida	4:09
5.	"Kaze ni Kinmokusei" (instrumental)	Yoichiro Nomura	5:04
6.	"Soredemo Itsuka" (instrumental)	2TROS	4:19

Type B
No.	Title	Music	Length
3.	"Pink no Cosmos" (ピンクのコスモス; lit. 'Pink Cosmos')	Atsushi, TomoLow	3:31
6.	"Pink no Cosmos" (instrumental)	Atsushi, TomoLow	3:31

Type C
No.	Title	Music	Length
3.	"Intro" (イントロ)	Atsushi, TomoLow	3:36
6.	"Intro" (instrumental)	Atsushi, TomoLow	3:36

Type D
No.	Title	Music	Length
3.	"Christmas Countdown" (クリスマスカウントダウン)	Kazuya Nagami	4:33
6.	"Christmas Countdown" (instrumental)	Kazuya Nagami	4:33

Regular
No.	Title	Music	Length
3.	"Boku wa Anytime" (僕はAnytime; lit. 'Anytime for Me')	Katsuhiko Sugiyama, M. Nachi	5:08
6.	"Boku wa Anytime" (instrumental)	Katsuhiko Sugiyama, M. Nachi	5:08

=== Blu-ray ===
==== Type A ====
17th Single Hiragana Hinatazaka46 Live at Toyota Arena Tokyo: Director's Cuts Collection (Part 1)

1. "Nageki no Delete"
2. "Hanbun no Kioku"
3. "Glass Made ga Yogore Teru"
4. "German Iris"
5. "Mijuku na Ikari"
6. "Konna ni Suki ni Natchatte Ii no?"

==== Type B ====
17th Single Hiragana Hinatazaka46 Live at Toyota Arena Tokyo: Director's Cuts Collection (Part 2)

1. "Kimi wa 0 kara 1 ni Nare"
2. "Tsuki to Hoshi ga Odoru Midnight"
3. "Cliffhanger"
4. "Knock o Suru na!"
5. "Yume wa Nansai Made?"
6. "See Through"

==== Type C ====
17th Single Hiragana Hinatazaka46 Live at Toyota Arena Tokyo: Director's Cuts Collection (Part 3)

1. "You're in My Way"
2. "Koishita Sakana wa Sora o Tobu"
3. "Additional Time"
4. "My Fans"
5. "Eien no Sofia"
6. VTR
7. "Empty"
8. "Kimi to Ikiru"

==== Type D ====
17th Single Hiragana Hinatazaka46 Live at Toyota Arena Tokyo: Behind the Scenes

== Personnel ==
List obtained from official website.

=== Ichaicha Mushi ===
Center: Yōko Shōgenji

- 1st row: Miku Kanemura, Yōko Shōgenji, Nao Kosaka
- 2nd row: Hinano Kamimura, Sakura Matsuo, Manami Ōno, Kaho Fujishima, Haruka Yamashita
- 3rd row: Nanami Konishi, Mikuni Takahashi, Yū Satō, Saki Katayama, Marie Morimoto, Mitsuki Hiraoka

=== Kaze ni Kinmokusei ===
Performed by Hiragana Hinatazaka46.

Center: Rio Shimizu

- 1st row: Niko Tsurusaki, Rio Shimizu, Tamaki Ishizuka
- 2nd row: Honoka Hirao, Rika Takai, Sumire Miyachi, Rina Watanabe
- 3rd row: Nīna Sakai, Izuki Shimoda, Mizuki Ōta, Kirari Takeuchi, Hinano Kuramori

=== Soredemo Itsuka ===
Performed by all fifth-generation members.

Center: Izuki Shimoda

- 1st row: Niko Tsurusaki, Saki Katayama, Izuki Shimoda, Sakura Matsuo, Mizuki Ōta
- 2nd row: Yū Satō, Manami Ōno, Hinano Kuramori, Rika Takai, Nīna Sakai

=== Pink no Cosmos ===
Performed by the Morimoto Going-out Squad.

Center: Marie Morimoto

Marie Morimoto, Tamaki Ishizuka, Haruka Yamashita, Manami Ōno, Hinano Kuramori, Nīna Sakai

=== Intro ===
Performed by all fourth-generation members.

Center: Sumire Miyachi

- 1st row: Yōko Shōgenji, Sumire Miyachi, Rina Watanabe
- 2nd row: Honoka Hirao, Mitsuki Hiraoka, Nanami Konishi, Tamaki Ishizuka
- 3rd row: Haruka Yamashita, Kirari Takeuchi, Rio Shimizu, Kaho Fujishima

=== Christmas Countdown ===
Performed by all members.

Center: Yōko Shōgenji

- 1st row: Kaho Fujishima, Miku Kanemura, Yōko Shōgenji, Nao Kosaka, Manami Ōno
- 2nd row: Marie Morimoto, Saki Katayama, Haruka Yamashita, Sakura Matsuo, Hinano Kamimura, Yū Satō
- 3rd row: Sumire Miyachi, Tamaki Ishizuka, Nanami Konishi, Mikuni Takahashi, Mitsuki Hiraoka, Rio Shimizu, Niko Tsurusaki
- 4th row: Nīna Sakai, Izuki Shimoda, Mizuki Ōta, Rina Watanabe, Rika Takai, Honoka Hirao, Kirari Takeuchi, Hinano Kuramori

=== Boku wa Anytime ===
Same as "Ichaicha Mushi"

== Charts ==
=== Weekly charts ===
Weekly chart performance for "Ichaicha Mushi"
Chart (2026)	Peak position
Japan (Oricon)	1
Japan Combined Singles (Oricon)	1
Japan Hot 100 (Billboard)	1

=== Monthly charts ===
Monthly chart performance for "Ichaicha Mushi"
Chart (2026)	Position
Japan (Oricon)	3

== Certifications ==
Certifications for "Ichaicha Mushi"
Region	Certification	Certified units/sales
Japan (RIAJ)	2× Platinum	500,000^{^}
^{^} Shipments figures based on certification alone.
