= List of Hinatazaka46 appearances =

Since its founding as Hiragana Keyakizaka46 in 2015, members of the girl group Hinatazaka46 have had numerous appearances in concerts, television series, variety shows, film, documentaries, and other media.

== Concerts ==
The Hinatansai (ひな誕祭; portmanteau of Hinatazaka and seitansai 生誕祭, lit. 'holy birthday') concerts, held in March or April, are to celebrate their debut anniversary on 27 March 2019. The W-Keyaki Festival (pronounced "Double Keyaki Festival") concerts in the summer were held jointly with Sakurazaka46 in 2021 and 2022 as the two groups formerly known as Keyakizaka46, and were the continuation of the Keyaki Republic (欅共和国, Keyaki Kyōwakoku) concerts held annually by that group at the Fuji-Q Highland Conifer Forest until 2019. The Hiragana Christmas (ひらがなくりすます) concert was held on 11–13 December 2018, and was succeeded by the Hinakuri (ひなくり; short for Hina Christmas) concerts, held on or around Christmas from 2019 to 2022, and would be revived as an arena tour in 2026. Aside from these, there have also been various non-regular concerts, tours, and other live events.

=== Hiragana Keyakizaka46 ===
- "Keyakizaka46 Joint Performance" (けやき坂46単独公演) ( 21–22 March 2017: Zepp Tokyo)
- "Hiragana Keyaki Nippon Budokan 3 Days" (ひらがなけやき日本武道館3Days) (30 January – 1 February 2018: Nippon Budokan)
- "Hiragana Christmas 2018" (ひらがなくりすます2018) ( 11–13 December 2018: Nippon Budokan)

=== Hinatazaka46 ===
- "Hinatazaka46 Debut Countdown Live" (日向坂46デビューカウントダウンライブ) ( 5–6 March 2019: Yokohama Arena)
- "3rd Single Release Commemorative Live" (3rdシングル発売記念ワンマンライブ) (26 September 2019: Saitama Super Arena)
- HinaChri (ひなくり) (Note: Hinatazaka Christmas abbreviation) (Christmas Live)
  - HinaChri 2019 〜17Nin no Santa Claus to Sora no Christmas〜 (ひなくり2019 〜17人のサンタクロースと空のクリスマス〜) ( 17–18 December 2019: Makuhari Messe International Exhibition Hall Hall 4–6, second day also livestreamed)
  - HinaChri 2020〜Obake Hotel to 22 Nin no Santa Claus〜 (ひなくり2020〜おばけホテルと22人のサンタクロース〜) (24 December 2020, only livestreamed)
  - HinaChri 2021 (ひなくり2021) ( 24–25 December 2021: Makuhari Messe International Exhibition Hall 9–11 Hall, both days also livestreamed)
  - HinaChri 2022 (ひなくり2022) ( 17–18 December 2022: Ariake Arena, second day also livestreamed)
- Hina Birthday Festival (ひな誕祭) (Anniversary Live)
  - Hinatazaka46 Debut 1 Syūnen Kinen Special talk and Live (日向坂46デビュー1周年記念 スペシャルトーク&ライブ) (Note: Hina Tansai was used as a hashtag when it was held for the first time.) (31 March 2020: livestreaming only on YouTube)
  - 〜Memorial Live: 2 Kaime no Hinatansai〜 (～MEMORIAL LIVE：2回目のひな誕祭～) (27 March 2021: livestreamed concert with limited audience seats, 746 seats were available)
  - Hinatazaka46 3rd Anniversary Memorial Live 〜 3 Kaime no Hinatansai〜 (日向坂46 3周年記念MEMORIAL LIVE ～3回目のひな誕祭～) ( 30–31 March 2022: Tokyo Dome, both days also livestreamed)
  - Hinatazaka46 4th Anniversary Memorial Live 〜 4 Kaime no Hinatansai〜 (日向坂46 4周年記念MEMORIAL LIVE ～4回目のひな誕祭～) ( 1–2 April 2023: Yokohama Stadium, second day also livestreamed)
  - Hinatazaka46 5th Anniversary Memorial Live 〜 5 Kaime no Hinatansai〜 (日向坂46 5周年記念MEMORIAL LIVE ～5回目のひな誕祭～)( 6–7 April 2024: Yokohama Stadium, both days also livestreamed)
- Unit Festival (ユニット祭り)（only livestreamed）
  - Hinatazaka46 Haru no Unit Festival Ohisama Best Playlist2021 (春のユニット祭り おひさまベスト・プレイリスト2021) (6 March 2021: Hikari TV Channel)
  - Hinatazaka46 Fuyu no Dai Unit Festival Christmas Special (日向坂46 冬の大ユニット祭り"X'masスペシャル)（22 December 2022: Makuhari Messe International Exhibition Hall 9 Hall）
- W-Keyaki Fes. (W-Keyaki Fes.) (Joint event with Sakurazaka46: Fuji-Q Conifer Forest)
  - 2021 ( 10–11 July 2021, both days also livestreamed)
  - 2022 (July 21・23, 2022: Live streaming only on the second day) (Note: The performance was postponed because several members of Sakurazaka46 tested positive for COVID-19)
- "Hinatazaka46 Live Online, Yes! with You! 22 Nin no Ongakutai to Fūgawari na Nakama tachi" (Hinatazaka46 Live Online, Yes! with You! 〜"22人"の音楽隊と風変わりな仲間たち〜; lit. 'Hinatazaka46 Live Online, Yes! with You! The 22-member Music Group and their Quirky Friends') (Note: A reproduction performance of "Hinatazaka46 Haru no Zenkoku Arena Tour 2020 〜18 Nin no Ongakutai to Fugawari na Nakama Tachi〜" (日向坂46 春の全国アリーナツアー2020 ～18人の音楽隊と風変わりな仲間たち～), which was canceled due to the influence of the COVID-19 pandemic.)(31 July 2020, only livestreamed)
- "Miho Watanabe Graduation Ceremony" (渡邉美穂 卒業セレモニー) (28 June 2022: Tokyo International Forum, Hall A, also livestreamed)
- "Yūka Kageyama Graduation Ceremony" (影山優佳 卒業セレモニー) (19 July 2023: Tokyo International Forum, Hall A, also livestreamed)
- "Kyōko Saitō Graduation Concert" (齊藤京子 卒業コンサート)(5 April 2024: Yokohama Stadium, also livestreamed)

=== Collaborations ===
==== Hinatazaka46×Dasada ====
- Hinatazaka46×Dasada Live & Fashion Show ( 4–5 February 2020, Yokohama Arena) (Note: Except Nao Kosaka)
- Hinatazaka46×Dasada Fall & Winter Collection (15 October 2020, only livestreamed)

==== Hinatazaka46×Koeharu! ====
- Hinatazaka46×Koeharu Liveshow! (5 November 2021, only livestreamed)

== Tours ==
=== Hiragana Keyakizaka46 ===
==== Hiragana Zenkoku Tour 2017 ====
The Hiragana Zenkoku Tour 2017 (ひらがな全国ツアー2017) took place from 31 May to 12 December.

Performance
Year	Date	Venue
2017	31 May	Zepp Namba
2017	6 July	Zepp Nagoya
2017	26 September	Zepp Sapporo
2017	6 November	Fukuoka Sunpalace Hall
2017	12 December	Makuhari Messe Event Hall

==== Hashiridasu Shunkan Tour 2018 ====
The Hashiridasu Shunkan Tour 2018 (走り出す瞬間ツアー2018) took place from 4 June to 10 July.

Performance
Year	Date	Venue
2018	4–6 June	Pacifico Yokohama National Convention Hall
2018	13 June	Tokyo International Forum, Hall A
2018	27–28 June	Festival Hall Osaka
2018	2–3 July	Nagoya Century Hall
2018	9–10 July	Makuhari Messe Event Hall

=== Hinatazaka46 ===
==== Zenkoku Ohisama ka Keikaku 2021 ====
The Zenkoku Ohisama ka Keikaku 2021 (全国おひさま化計画 2021) took place from 15 September to 20 October. (20 October 2021: Nippon Gaishi Hall, also livestreamed)

Performance
Year	Date	Venue
2021	15–16 September	Hiroshima Green Arena
2021	26–27 September	Marine Messe Fukuoka
2021	29–30 September	Osaka-jō Hall
2021	7–8 October	Sekisui Heim Super Arena
2021	13–15 October	Tokyo Garden Theatre
2021	19–20 October	Nippon Gaishi Hall

==== Happy Smile Tour 2022 ====
The Happy Smile Tour 2022 took place from 10 September. (13 November 2022: Yoyogi National Gymnasium 1st Gymnasium, also livestreamed) (Note: Selected and included on the group's 9th single "One Choice".)

Performance
Year	Date	Venue
2022	10–11 September	Aichi Sky Expo
2022	17–18 September	World Memorial Hall
2022	17–18 October	Pia Arena MM
2022	12–13 November	Yoyogi National Gymnasium 1st Gymnasium

==== Happy Train Tour 2023 ====
The Happy Train Tour 2023 took place from 30 August. ( 9–10 December 2023: K-Arena Yokohama, both days also livestreamed) (Note: Selected and included on the group's 2nd album "Myakuutsu Kanjō".)

Performance
Year	Date	Venue
2023	30–31 August	Osaka-jō Hall
2023	12–13 September	Yokohama Arena
2023	6–7 October	Sekisui Heim Super Arena
2023	14–15 October	Marine Messe Fukuoka
2023	9–10 December	K-Arena Yokohama

==== Monster Groove Tour 2025 ====
Upcoming

== Filmography ==
=== Television dramas ===
Year	Title	Run	Notes	Ref(s)
2017	Zankoku na Kankyaku Tachi (残酷な観客達)	18 May – 20 July	Final episode only	
2017	Re:Mind (Re:Mind)	20 October – 29 December		
2017	Re:Mind (Re:Mind)	29 December		
2020	Dasada (DASADA)	16 January – 19 March		
2020	Dasada Mirai e no Countdown (〜未来へのカウントダウン〜)	2 July – 10 September		
2021	Borderless (ボーダレス)	7 March – 9 May	With Nogizaka46 and Sakurazaka46	
2021	Koeharu! (声春っ!)	29 April – 1 July		
2023	Actress (アクトレス)	14 April – 2 June	Sequel to Borderless; with Nogizaka46 and Sakurazaka46	

=== Variety shows ===
Name	Run	Notes	Ref(s)
Keyakitte, Kakenai? (欅って、書けない?)	5 October 2015 – 12 October 2020		
Hiragana Oshi (ひらがな推し)	9 April 2018 – 1 April 2019		
KeyaBingo!4 Hiragana keyaki tte Nani? (KeyaBingo!4 ひらがなけやきって何?)	17 April 2018 – 26 June 2018	Season 4	
Hinatazaka de Aimashō (日向坂で会いましょう)	8 April 2019–present	Formerly Hiragana Oshi	
HinaBingo!	16 April 2019 – 25 June 2019		
HinaBingo!2	16 July 2019 – 24 September 2019	Season 2	
Self-Documentary of Hinatazaka46 (セルフ Documentary of 日向坂46)	29 September 2019 – 23 February 2020		
Self-Documentary of Hinatazaka46 (セルフ Documentary of 日向坂46)	26 June 2022	Mikuni Takahashi, Marie Morimoto, Haruyo Yamaguchi	
Self-Documentary of Hinatazaka46 (セルフ Documentary of 日向坂46)	17 July 2022	Yūka Kageyama	
Self-Documentary of Hinatazaka46 (セルフ Documentary of 日向坂46)	2023	Fourth generation members	
Hinatazaka46 desu Chotto Ii desu ka? (日向坂46です。ちょっといいですか?)	14 March 2020 – 10 April 2021		
Hinachoi Season2 (ひなちょい Season2)	19 April 2021 – 27 March 2023	Season 2	
Hinatazaka ni Narimashō (日向坂になりましょう)	26 April 2023–	Fourth generation members	

=== Talk shows ===
Name	Run	Notes	Ref(s)
Love It! (ラヴィット!)	30 March – 20 September 2021; 13 April – 29 June 2022	Monthly Co-host: Shiho Katō, Ayaka Takamoto, Konoka Matsuda, Suzuka Tomita	
X-Moment Presents Choten 〜Konshū Dare o Yosō suru? (X-MOMENT Presents CHOTeN 〜今週、誰を予想する?〜)	2 October 2021 – 24 September 2022	Co-host: Mana Takase, (Note: Appearing from July 2022) Akari Nibu, Konoka Matsuda, Miho Watanabe (Note: before graduation)	

=== Animation ===
Year	Title	Voice Role(s)	Channel	Run	Notes	Ref(s)
2020	Pickles the Frog: Kimochi no Iro (かえるのピクルス – きもちのいろ -)	Miku Kanemura, Akari Nibu, Miho Watanabe	BS12	4 October – 27 December		

=== Films ===
Release date	Title	Ref(s)
25 October 2024	All of Tokyo! (ゼンブ・オブ・トーキョー, Zenbu of Tokyo)	
26 February 2027	Zenbu of World (ゼンブ・オブ・ワールド)	

=== Documentary films ===
Release date	Title	Production	Ref(s)
7 August 2020	3 Nen Me no Debut (3年目のデビュー; transl. Third Year Debut: The Documentary of Hinatazaka46)	TBS Television	
8 July 2022	Kibō to Zetsubō Sono Namida o Dare mo Shiranai (希望と絶望 その涙を誰も知らない; transl. Hope and Despair: The Tears Nobody Knows)	TBS Television	

== Theater ==
Year	Title	Role(s)	Venue	Run	Notes	Ref(s)
2018	Ayumi (あゆみ)	Various	AiiA 2.5 Theater Tokyo	20 April – 6 May	Part of Team Castanets (チームカスタネット) and Team Harmonica (チームハーモニカ)	
2018	Magia Record (マギアレコード 魔法少女まどか☆マギカ外伝)	Various	Akasaka ACT Theater	24 August – 9 September	Select members only	
2018	Zambi (ザンビ)		Tokyo Dome City Hall	16–25 November	Select members only; collaboration with Nogizaka46 and Keyakizaka46	
2019	Zambi〜Theater's end〜 (ザンビ〜Theater's end〜)		Tennōzu Galaxy Theater	7–17 February	Select members only; collaboration with Nogizaka46 and Keyakizaka46	
2023	Maku ga Agaru	Marie Morimoto, Haruyo Yamaguchi	Sunshine Theater	12–17 July	Lead role	

== Radio ==
Year	Title	Hosts	Ref(s)
2020–present	Hinatazaka46 no "Hi" (Note: 日向坂46の「ひ」)	Alternating (2–3 hosts per episode)	
2020–2024	Belc presents Hinatazaka46 no Yokei na Kotomade Yarimashō!	Akari Nibu, Miku Kanemura, Haruka Yamashita	
2021–present	SakuraHinataLotti no Nobishiro Radio (Note: さくらひなたロッチの伸びしろラジオ)	Lotti, Haruyo Yamaguchi (Note: 2 people from Sakurazaka46 or Hinatazaka46 member appear on a weekly basis.)	
2021–present	Hinakoi presents Hinatazaka46 Konoka Matsuda no Hinatazaka Kōkō Hōsō-bu (Note: ひなこい presents 日向坂46 松田好花の日向坂高校放送部)	Konoka Matsuda (Note: Hinatazaka46 members appear every other week.)	
2022–present	Lawson presents Hinatazaka46 no Hotto Hitoiki! (Note: ローソン presents 日向坂46のほっとひといき!; transl. Lawson presents Hinatazaka46's Breath of Relief)	Mikuni Takahashi, Kaho Fujishima, Haruka Yamashita, Sakura Matsuo	
2023	Hinatazaka46 Sarina Ushio no Sarimakashī Radio (Note: 日向坂46潮紗理菜のサリマカシーラジオ)	Sarina Ushio	

== Games ==
Name	Run	Notes	Ref(s)
Keyaki no Kiseki/Hinata no Ayumi (欅のキセキ/日向のアユミ)	18 October 2017 – 31 August 2021		
Zambi The Game (ザンビ THE GAME)	15 May 2019 – 28 January 2021	Select members only	
Uni's On Air (ユニソンエアー)	24 September 2019–		
Hinakoi (ひなこい)	18 November 2020–		
Hinatazaka46 to Fushigi na Toshokan (日向坂46とふしぎな図書室)	25 February 2021 – 18 December 2024		

== Attraction ==
Year	Title	Role(s)	Venue	Notes	Run	Ref(s)
2019	Zambi The Room Saigo no Sentaku (ザンビ THE ROOM 最後の選択)	Various	Shibuya Hikarie, Hikarie Hall	Collaboration with Nogizaka46 and Keyakizaka46	31 July – 11 August	

== Fashion shows ==
=== Tokyo Girls Collection ===
Year	Date	Title	Venue	Model(s)	Notes	Ref(s)
2018	6 October	TGC Kitakyūshū 2018 by Tokyo Girls Collection	West Japan General Exhibition Center: New building		Each stage and live	
2019	30 March	Mynavi presents 28th Tokyo Girls Collection 2019 Spring/Summer	Yokohama Arena		Each stage and live	
2019	5 October	TGC Kitakyūshū 2019 by Tokyo Girls Collection	West Japan General Exhibition Center: New building		Each stage and live	
2020	11 January	SDGs Promotion TGC Shizuoka 2020 by Tokyo Girls Collection	Twin Messe Shizuoka	Dasada cast select members only	Each stage, Dasada stage and live	
2020	29 February	Mynavi presents 30th Tokyo Girls Collection 2020 Spring/Summer	Yoyogi National Gymnasium 1st Gymnasium	Dasada cast only (Note: 30th: Includes Hiyori Hamagishi, but excludes Mao Iguchi.) (Note: 31st: Except Mao Iguchi)	Each stage and Dasada stage	
2020	5 September	Mynavi presents 31st Tokyo Girls Collection 2020 Autumn/Winter Online	Saitama Super Arena	Dasada cast only	Each stage and Dasada stage	
2022	3 September	Mynavi presents 35th Tokyo Girls Collection 2022 Autumn/Winter	Saitama Super Arena	Shiho Katō, Kyōko Saitō, Kumi Sasaki, Mirei Sasaki, Ayaka Takamoto, Miku Kanemura, Nao Kosaka, Hiyori Hamagishi	Each stage	
2023	14 January	SDGs Promotion TGC Shizuoka 2023 by Tokyo Girls Collection	Twin Messe Shizuoka	Shiho Katō, Kyōko Saitō, Kumi Sasaki, Ayaka Takamoto, Miku Kanemura	Each stage	
2023	11 February	oomiya presents TGC Wakayama 2023 by Tokyo Girls Collection	Wakayama Big Whale	Shiho Katō, Kumi Sasaki, Miku Kanemura, Hiyori Hamagishi	Each stage	
2023	4 March	Mynavi presents 36th Tokyo Girls Collection 2023 Spring/Summer	Yoyogi National Gymnasium 1st Gymnasium	Shiho Katō, Kyōko Saitō, Kumi Sasaki, Ayaka Takamoto, Miku Kanemura, Nao Kosaka, Hiyori Hamagishi	Each stage	

=== GirlsAward ===
Year	Date	Title	Venue	Model(s)	Notes	Ref(s)
2019	18 May	Rakuten GirlsAward 2019 SPRING/SUMMER	Makuhari Messe International Exhibition Hall 9-11 Hall		Each stage and live	
2019	28 September	Rakuten GirlsAward 2019 AUTUMN/WINTER	Makuhari Messe International Exhibition Hall 9-11 Hall		Each stage and live	
2022	14 May	Rakuten GirlsAward 2022 SPRING/SUMMER	Makuhari Messe International Exhibition Hall 9-11 Hall	Shiho Katō, Kyōko Saitō, Kumi Sasaki, Mirei Sasaki, Ayaka Takamoto, Miku Kanemura, Hiyori Hamagishi	Each stage and live	
2023	4 May	Rakuten GirlsAward 2023 SPRING/SUMMER	Yoyogi National Gymnasium 1st Gymnasium	Shiho Katō, Kumi Sasaki, Ayaka Takamoto, Miku Kanemura, Nao Kosaka, Hiyori Hamagishi	Each stage	

== Events ==
Year	Title	Role	Network	Notes	Ref(s)
2021	41st All Japan High School Quiz Championship (第41回 全国高等学校クイズ選手権)	Main Supporter (Note: Supporting artist)	Nippon TV	Performed official support song "Nando de mo Nando de mo"	
2022	The 42nd All Japan High School Quiz Championship (第42回 全国高等学校クイズ選手権)	Observer	Nippon TV	Yūka Kageyama and Konoka Matsuda	
2023	2023 World Table Tennis Championships	Supporting artist	TV Tokyo (BS TV Tokyo)		

== See also ==
- List of Hinatazaka46 members
