= Kind of Love (song) =

- Digital edition cover, featuring a collage of all physical release covers

Single by Hinatazaka46
- Released: May 20, 2026
- Genre: J-pop
- Label: Sony Music Labels
- Lyricist: Yasushi Akimoto
- Producer: Yasushi Akimoto

Hinatazaka46 singles chronology
| "Cliffhanger" (2026) | "Kind of Love" (2026) | "Ichaicha Mushi" (2026) |

Music video
- "Kind of Love" on YouTube
- "Empty" on YouTube
- "Enshūritsu" on YouTube

"Kind of Love" is the 17th single by Japanese girl group Hinatazaka46, released on May 20, 2026 by Sony Music Labels. It features Kaho Fujishima as the title song lead performer. The single debuted atop both the weekly Oricon Singles Chart and Billboard Japan Hot 100.

== Production and release ==
"Kind of Love" is Hinatazaka46's second single of 2026, following the release of "Cliffhanger" in January. The single continues the group's use of the senbatsu (選抜; lit. 'selection') system, featuring a 14-member lineup for the title track with fourth-generation member Kaho Fujishima serving as solo center (lead performer) for the first time, after previously serving as one of the dual centers for 2024's "Zettaiteki Dairokkan". It is the first single after the departure of Konoka Matsuda in March. It was announced and first performed live during the encore of the Hinatansai anniversary concert on April 5, 2026, at the Yokohama Stadium.

Members who were not selected for the title track are referred to as Hiragana Hinatazaka46 (ひなた坂46) and performed "Empty", centered by Mitsuki Hiraoka. The single also introduces several sub-unit tracks across its various editions: "Kokoro no Buranko" by Yōko Shōgenji and Haruka Yamashita; "Shuwa Shuwa" by Suekkomarin (末っ子まりん; lit. 'Youngest Children Marines', as all three members are associated with sea animals), a unit of the three youngest fifth-generation members; and "Saraba Saraba", performed by the group's third-generation members.

The single was released on physical media on May 20, 2026 in multiple editions, consisting of special editions (Types A to D) packaged with Blu-ray discs, and a regular CD-only edition.

== Music videos ==
The "Kind of Love" music video was directed by Shōhei Gotō and choreographed by CRE8BOY, with Hiroto Hashimoto returning as creative producer. It is Gotō's first work with the group. The theme is the "moment of love at first sight". According to center Kaho Fujishima, the blue paint on the performers' left ring fingers symbolizes adulthood, and her dipping her finger in the color serves as a "coming-of-age ritual" as she transforms from a girl into a woman. Regarding the scene in which she smears the paint on her face, she has revealed that doing so was "optional", but she chose to do it and requested another take after being dissatisfied with the first. She holds a purple anemone flower in several scenes, which in hanakotoba (Japanese floriography) could mean "I'll believe in you and wait for you" and "fleeting love", among others.

The "Enshūritsu" music video, released on May 18, 2026, was directed by Yuki Yoshida and choreographed by Chaso, with Hiroki Tokumura as producer and Hiroto Hashimoto as creative producer. It depicts center Yū Satō as an android designated "Prototype Model 'U', Adolescent Behavior Analysis Unit", who encounters a group of human schoolgirls at a school monitored by a futuristic surveillance system and discovers the capacity to feel emotions through engaging in leisurely activities with them at their hideout. It opens with a screen stating that U is on "day 430" of operations, matching the number of days from the release of Satō's introduction video on March 14, 2025 (Pi Day) to the music video's release. Member Nīna Sakai described the school as "highly regulated", while the schoolgirls' leisurely conversation at the hideout represented the "preciousness" of youth. She also revealed that the hand choreography during the chorus incorporated the first eight digits of pi (3-1-4-1-5-9-2-6).

== Reception ==
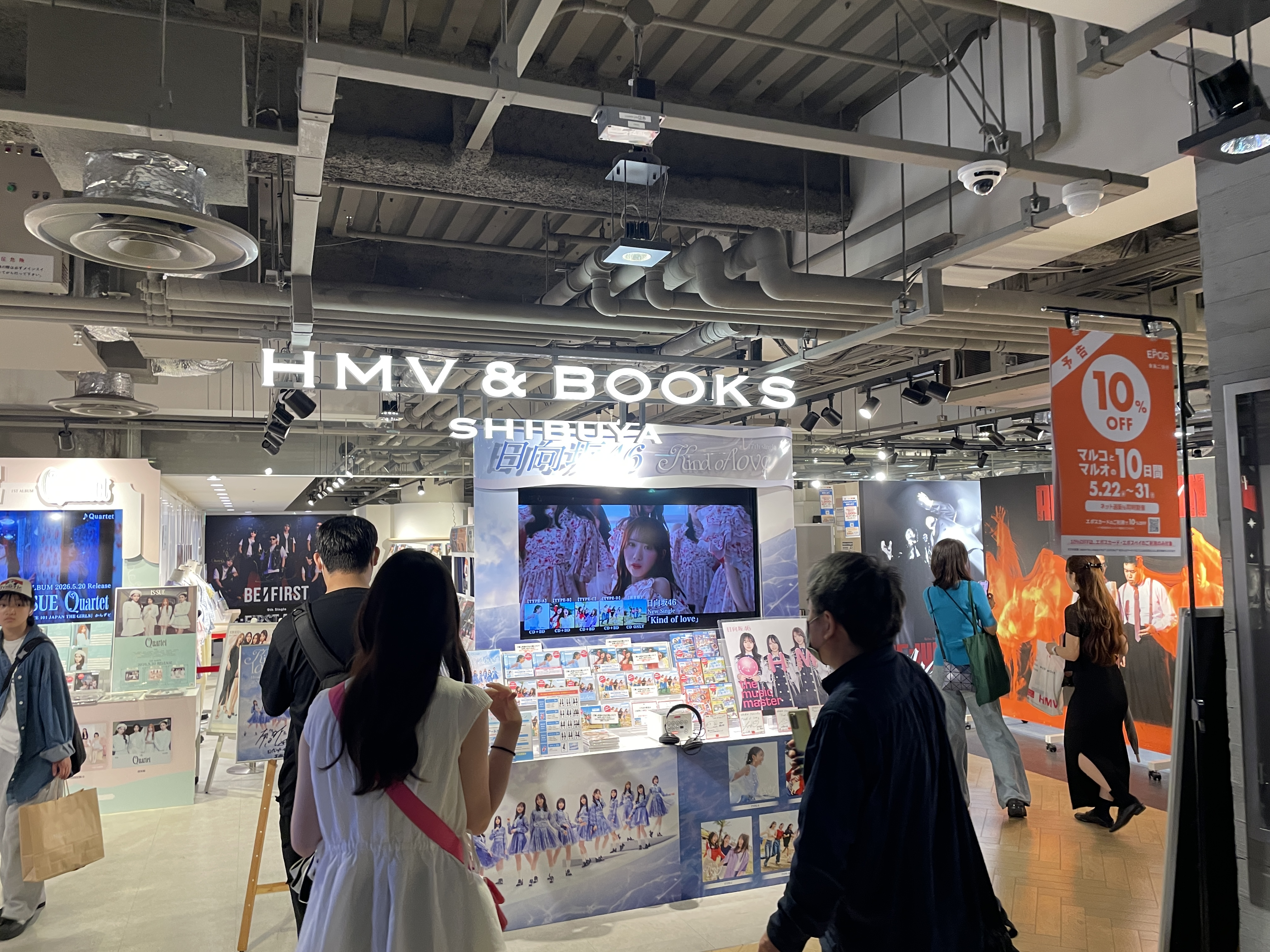
"Kind of Love" display at the HMV music store in Shibuya

"Kind of Love" debuted at number one on both the weekly Oricon Singles Chart and Billboard Japan Hot 100, selling over 449 thousand physical copies according to Oricon and 520 thousand copies according to Billboard Japan in its first week. The digital release also topped the Oricon Weekly Digital Album Chart.

== Track listing ==
1. Kind of Love
2. "Empty"
3. Different tracks on each type:
  - Type A: "Enshūritsu" (円周率; lit. 'Pi')
  - Type B: "Kokoro no Buranko" (心のブランコ; lit. 'Swing of the Heart')
  - Type C: "Shuwa Shuwa" (onomatopoeia for bubbliness)
  - Type D: "Saraba Saraba" (さらば さらば; lit. 'Farewell, Farewell')
  - Regular: "Kimi ni Yarareta!" (君にやられた!; lit. 'You Got Me!')
4. Kind of Love (off-vocal)
5. Empty (off-vocal)
6. Off-vocal versions of track 3

=== Blu-ray ===
==== Type A: Hinatazaka46 5th Generation "Shinzanmono 2025 LIVE at Theater Milano-Za" (Part 1) ====
1. Sora Tobu Kuruma
2. Azatokawaii
3. One Choice
4. Do Re Mi So La Si Do
5. Konna ni Suki ni Nacchatte Ii no?
6. Kodokutachi yo
7. Seishun no Uma
8. Zettaiteki Dairokkan
9. See Through

==== Type B: Hinatazaka46 5th Generation "Shinzanmono 2025 LIVE at Theater Milano-Za" (Part 2) ====
1. Yoake no Speed
2. What You Like!
3. Ano Ko ni Guigui
4. Sotsugyō Shashin Dake ga Shitteru
5. Ai wa Kocchi no Mono da 2025
6. Boku ni Tsuzuke
7. Hey! Ohisama!
8. German Iris
9. Joyful Love

==== Type C: 5th Generation Individual Promotional Video ====
1. Mizuki Ōta
2. Manami Ōno
3. Saki Katayama
4. Hinano Kuramori
5. Nina Sakai

==== Type D: 5th Generation Individual Promotional Video ====
1. Yū Satō
2. Izuki Shimoda
3. Rika Takai
4. Niko Tsurusaki
5. Sakura Matsuo

== Personnel ==
Lineups obtained from official website.

=== "Kind of Love" ===
Center: Kaho Fujishima

- 1st row: Yōko Shōgenji, Kaho Fujishima, Manami Ōno
- 2nd row: Saki Katayama, Hinano Kamimura, Nao Kosaka, Miku Kanemura, Sakura Matsuo
- 3rd row: Sumire Miyachi, Rina Watanabe, Haruyo Yamaguchi, Marie Morimoto, Rio Shimizu, Mikuni Takahashi

=== "Empty" ===
Center: Mitsuki Hiraoka

- 1st row: Rika Takai, Mitsuki Hiraoka, Haruka Yamashita
- 2nd row: Niko Tsurusaki, Honoka Hirao, Tamaki Ishizuka, Nanami Konishi, Yū Satō
- 3rd row: Hinano Kuramori, Mizuki Ōta, Kirari Takeuchi, Nina Sakai, Izuki Shimoda

=== "Enshūritsu" ===
Center: Yū Satō

- 1st row: Rika Takai, Mizuki Ōta, Yū Satō, Niko Tsurusaki, Hinano Kuramori
- 2nd row: Saki Katayama, Izuki Shimoda, Nina Sakai, Manami Ōno, Sakura Matsuo

=== "Kokoro no Buranko" ===
Yōko Shōgenji, Haruka Yamashita

=== "Shuwa Shuwa" ===
Manami Ōno, Nina Sakai, Rika Takai

=== "Saraba Saraba" ===
Hinano Kamimura, Mikuni Takahashi, Marie Morimoto, Haruyo Yamaguchi

=== "Kimi ni Yarareta!" ===
Same as "Kind of Love"

== Charts ==
=== Weekly charts ===
Weekly chart performance for "Kind of Love"
| Chart (2026) | Peak position |
|---|---|
| Japan (Japan Hot 100) | 1 |
| Japan Top Singles Sales (Billboard Japan) | 1 |
| Japan (Oricon) | 1 |
| Japan Combined Singles (Oricon) | 1 |
| Japanese Digital Albums (Oricon) | 1 |
