= List of Hinatazaka46 members =

Wikimedia list article

Since its founding, Hinatazaka46 has had a total of 47 members from five generations. 26 of those members are still in the group.

== Current members ==
Third generation members marked with an asterisk (*) joined after the initial third generation member on 15 February 2020.

Image	Name	Birth date (age)	Prefecture of origin	Generation	Notes
	Miku Kanemura (金村美玖)	10 September 2002 (age 24)	Saitama	2	
	Nao Kosaka (小坂菜緒)	7 September 2002 (age 24)	Ōsaka	2	
	Hinano Kamimura (上村ひなの)	12 April 2004 (age 22)	Tokyo	3	
	Mikuni Takahashi (髙橋未来虹)*	27 September 2003 (age 23)	Tokyo	3	Captain
	Marie Morimoto (森本茉莉)*	23 February 2004 (age 22)	Tokyo	3	
	Tamaki Ishizuka (石塚瑶季)	6 August 2004 (age 22)	Tokyo	4	
	Nanami Konishi (小西夏菜実)	3 October 2004 (age 22)	Hyōgo	4	
	Rio Shimizu (清水理央)	15 January 2005 (age 21)	Chiba	4	
	Yōko Shōgenji (正源司陽子)	14 February 2007 (age 19)	Hyōgo	4	
	Kirari Takeuchi (竹内希来里)	20 February 2006 (age 20)	Hiroshima	4	
	Honoka Hirao (平尾帆夏)	31 July 2003 (age 23)	Tottori	4	
	Mitsuki Hiraoka (平岡海月)	9 April 2002 (age 24)	Fukui	4	Oldest active member
	Kaho Fujishima (藤嶌果歩)	7 August 2006 (age 20)	Hokkaido	4	
	Sumire Miyachi (宮地すみれ)	31 December 2005 (age 20)	Kanagawa	4	
	Haruka Yamashita (山下葉留花)	20 May 2003 (age 23)	Aichi	4	
	Rina Watanabe (渡辺莉奈)	7 February 2009 (age 17)	Fukuoka	4	
	Mizuki Ōta (大田美月)	7 December 2006 (age 19)	Ōsaka	5	
	Manami Ōno (大野愛実)	5 May 2007 (age 19)	Tokyo	5	
	Saki Katayama (片山紗希)	26 December 2006 (age 19)	Saitama	5	
	Hinano Kuramori (蔵盛妃那乃)	23 January 2006 (age 20)	Ōsaka	5	
	Nīna Sakai (坂井新奈)	14 March 2009 (age 17)	Kanagawa	5	Youngest
	Yū Satō (佐藤優羽)	10 September 2006 (age 20)	Fukuoka	5	
	Izuki Shimoda (下田衣珠季)	26 December 2006 (age 19)	Chiba	5	
	Rika Takai (高井俐香)	1 August 2007 (age 19)	Hyōgo	5	
	Niko Tsurusaki (鶴崎仁香)	27 March 2004 (age 22)	Kanagawa	5	
	Sakura Matsuo (松尾桜)	8 June 2005 (age 21)	Kanagawa	5	

== Former members ==
Image	Name	Birth date (age)	Prefecture of origin	Generation	Graduation date	Notes
	Neru Nagahama (長濱ねる)	4 September 1998 (age 28)	Nagasaki	1 (Special)	24 September 2017	Dual position cancelled, became member of only Kanji Keyakizaka46
	Memi Kakizaki (柿崎芽実)	2 December 2001 (age 24)	Nagano	1	11 August 2019	
	Mao Iguchi (井口眞緒)	10 November 1995 (age 31)	Niigata	1	30 March 2020	Oldest founding member
	Miho Watanabe (渡邉美穂)	24 February 2000 (age 26)	Saitama	2	31 July 2022	First second generation member to graduate
	Manamo Miyata (宮田愛萌)	28 April 1998 (age 28)	Tokyo	2	18 December 2022	
	Yūka Kageyama (影山優佳)	8 May 2001 (age 25)	Tokyo	1	19 July 2023	
	Honoka Kishi (岸帆夏)	15 August 2004 (age 22)	Tokyo	4	7 December 2023	First fourth generation member to graduate
	Sarina Ushio (潮紗理菜)	26 December 1997 (age 28)	Kanagawa	1	31 December 2023	
	Kyōko Saitō (齊藤京子)	5 September 1997 (age 29)	Tokyo	1	5 April 2024	First member who has served as center (lead performer) for a Hinatazaka46 title song to graduate
	Ayaka Takamoto (高本彩花)	2 November 1998 (age 28)	Kanagawa	1	5 July 2024	
	Shiho Katō (加藤史帆)	2 February 1998 (age 28)	Tokyo	1	25 December 2024	
	Hiyori Hamagishi (濱岸ひより)	28 September 2002 (age 24)	Fukuoka	2	27 December 2024	Held graduation ceremony on 5 December 2024
	Akari Nibu (丹生明里)	15 February 2001 (age 25)	Saitama	2	29 January 2025	Held graduation ceremony on 1 December 2024
	Mei Higashimura (東村芽依)	23 August 1998 (age 28)	Nara	1	28 February 2025	Held graduation ceremony on 25 January 2025
	Mirei Sasaki (佐々木美玲)	17 December 1999 (age 26)	Hyōgo	1	5 April 2025	
	Kumi Sasaki (佐々木久美)	22 January 1996 (age 30)	Chiba	1	6 April 2025	Former captain
	Mana Takase (高瀬愛奈)	20 September 1998 (age 28)	Ōsaka	1	1 May 2025	Last first generation member to graduate
	Suzuka Tomita (富田鈴花)	18 January 2001 (age 25)	Kanagawa	2	5 August 2025	
	Hina Kawata (河田陽菜)	23 July 2001 (age 25)	Yamaguchi	2	19 November 2025	
	Konoka Matsuda (松田好花)	27 April 1999 (age 27)	Kyoto	2	28 February 2026	
	Haruyo Yamaguchi (山口陽世)*	23 February 2004 (age 22)	Tottori	3	23 August 2026	First third generation member to graduate

== See also ==
- List of Hinatazaka46 appearances
