= Cliffhanger (song) =

- Digital edition cover, featuring a collage of all physical release covers

Single by Hinatazaka46
- Language: Japanese
- Released: January 28, 2026
- Genre: J-pop
- Label: Sony Music Labels
- Composer: Katsuhiko Sugiyama
- Lyricists: Yasushi Akimoto; Konoka Matsuda
- Producer: Yasushi Akimoto

Hinatazaka46 singles chronology
| "Onegai Bach!" (2025) | "Cliffhanger" (2026) | "Kind of Love" (2026) |

Music video
- "Cliffhanger" on YouTube
- "Kimi to Ikiru" on YouTube
- "Suki ni Naru Crescendo" on YouTube
- "Cliffhanger" (live) on YouTube
- "Cliffhanger" (choreography) on YouTube

"Cliffhanger" (Japanese: クリフハンガー, Hepburn: Kurifuhangā) is the 16th single by Japanese girl group Hinatazaka46, released on January 28, 2026 by Sony Music Labels. It features Manami Ōno in her first role as title song lead performer. The single debuted atop both the weekly Oricon Singles Chart and Billboard Japan weekly singles chart.

"Cliffhanger" was announced in November 2025 and marked the debut of Hinatazaka46's newest fifth generation in a title song lineup. It is also the final single to include Konoka Matsuda, who would leave the group in February and wrote the lyrics to one of the songs on the single. The single contains seven songs in total, spread over five editions. Three main music videos were produced for the single, with a live music video and a choreography-focused one added later.

== Production and release ==
"Cliffhanger" was announced at the end of the Tokyo leg of Hinatazaka46's Monster Groove national tour at the Yoyogi National Stadium on November 21, 2025. It marks the debut of selected Hinatazaka46 fifth generation members, who debuted in March 2025, in the title song lineup, with fifth generation member Manami Ōno as center (lead performer). It also marks the group's return to the "selection" (選抜, senbatsu) system, where only selected members would perform the title song, after including all members other than the fifth generation in the previous two singles' title song lineups.

As with previous singles, members not selected for the title song were assigned to the Hiragana Hinatazaka46 (ひなた坂46) team, with Hinano Kamimura as center. The group's newest fourth and fifth generations performed one generational song each, "Surf's Up Girl" and "Suki ni Naru Crescendo" respectively. Sumire Miyachi and Rina Watanabe performed "Koi to Kansei no Hōsoku" as the duo Nō Aru Shōjo wa Skirt Yurasu (能ある少女はスカート揺らす; lit. 'A Capable Girl Flutters Her Skirt'), named after the proverb "a capable hawk hides its talons" (能ある鷹は爪を隠す, nō aru taka wa tsume o kakusu).

Konoka Matsuda, who would leave the group in February, penned the lyrics to "Namidame no Taiyō" (涙目の太陽; lit. 'Tearful Sun') and was notably the first Sakamichi Series member to be credited as lyricist for a song performed by an entire group. The song was played on-air for the first time during her Konoka Matsuda's All Night Nippon X radio program broadcast on January 22.

The single was released on physical media on January 28, 2026 in five editions, consisting of four special editions (Types A to D) and a regular edition.

== Composition ==
Katsuhiko Sugiyama composed the music of "Cliffhanger", his first work on a title track for Hinatazaka46. He has revealed that he dedicated an "unusual" level of effort and leaned into his "deep love" for rock music, such as Mr. Children, in composing the song. He intentionally pursued a "raw" sound for the track to evoke a "youth band" feel, playing the guitar and bass in a "rough and aggressive" manner to emulate the tendency of teenaged musicians to "assert their instruments" in a band setting, and limiting himself to only around three takes per track. He also employed unusual key changes in order to create a sound that could not be replicated by contemporary generative AI systems. In order to establish the emotional narrative for the music, he wrote his own placeholder lyrics.

The lyrics to "Namidame no Taiyō" (涙目の太陽; lit. 'Tearful Sun') was penned by Konoka Matsuda, who would leave the group in February. She was the first Sakamichi Series member to be credited as lyricist for a song performed by an entire group, as producer Yasushi Akimoto had been credited as sole lyricist for all such songs until then. She wrote the song as a "message to the future" with lyrics that reflect everyday life in the group, and wished for it to continue to be performed by the group, instead of only being associated with her departure. Tatsuya Kawasaki of Real Sound remarked that Matsuda's strength was in her ability to put her feelings into words and express them to others.

== Music video ==
The "Cliffhanger" music video was directed by Yoshika Matsuoka, with choreography by Rena of the RHT collective and creative production by Hiroto Hashimoto and Keita Togawa. It was Matsuoka's first collaboration with the group. Hashimoto described the "Cliffhanger" music video as a new "prologue" connecting the past, present, and future, in which everyone could take a new look at Hinatazaka46’s "identity" and its “happy aura". In an interview, center Manami Ōno revealed that prior to filming, she had "tearfully" shared with Matsuoka what Hinatazaka46 meant to her and what she had felt the group needed to say at the time, in particular that every member was a "protagonist", and that Matsuoka managed to deliver her feelings through the music video. Ōno also remarked that the final scene, where every member was dressed differently but wore the same shoes, represented the idea that while every member had her individuality, they were all walking the same path.

Billboard Japan described the music video for "Kimi to Ikiru", directed by Ryohei Shingu and choreographed by CRE8BOY, as portraying various moments of separation in order to emphasize the happiness of living with the titular "you". According to center Hinano Kamimura, "you" could be interpreted broadly as a romantic partner, family member, friend, idol or other favorite thing, or even oneself, and that all those interpretations are valid.

Directed by Yoden, the "Suki ni Naru Crescendo" music was themed around ice hockey. Center Saki Katayama has revealed that the director came up with the hockey team name "Hinatazaka Crescends" printed on the ice hockey costumes.

== Reception ==
"Cliffhanger" debuted atop both the weekly Oricon Singles Chart and Billboard Japan weekly singles chart, with 473 thousand copies sold according to Oricon, extending Hinatazaka46's records of "consecutive chart-topping singles" and "consecutive first-week single sales of over 300,000 copies" since debut to 16 releases, and 587 thousand copies sold according to Billboard Japan.

Ryuya Kawasaki of Real Sound praised Katsuhiko Sugiyama's composition on the title song with his "familiar" pattern of a compelling intro, building up energy in the bridge, and emotional release in the chorus, comparing it to his previous works like "Seifuku no Mannequin" (2012) and "Kikkake" (2016). The "shadow" or "uncertainty" in its melody conveys a sense of determination to move forward despite lingering anxiety, mirroring the group's evolution following the major changes in membership in recent years. Natalie and E-Talent Bank described the music video as both depicting "past struggles" and "seizing the future", with the emotional release in the final scene aptly reflecting the title "Cliffhanger", leaving viewers with a sense of anticipation for what would come next for the group; E-Talent Bank also noted Manami Ōno's "significant potential" and "expressive power" as the center.

On "Suki ni Naru Crescendo", RAGnet remarked that it was "brimming" with the fresh charm of the fifth-generation members, with lyrics that captured the "radiance" of youth with a "touch of heartache", vividly depicting the emotional journey of falling in love with a longtime friend, and upbeat sound and call-and-response interludes in English that would excite in concerts. In a report on the seventh Hinatansai concert in April 2026, Bezzy remarked that "Koi to Kansei no Hōsoku" presented a "serious" atmosphere, a stark contrast to Miyachi and Watanabe's expressions on variety shows.

== Track listing ==
All lyrics are written by Yasushi Akimoto except "Namidame no Taiyō", written by Konoka Matsuda. Each edition contains the same first two tracks, with the third track and its instrumental version varying by edition.

Type A
| No. | Title | Music | Length |
|---|---|---|---|
| 1. | "Cliffhanger" | Katsuhiko Sugiyama | 4:16 |
| 2. | "Kimi to Ikiru" (君と生きる; lit. 'Living With You') | Chiaki Nagasawa, Saori Nagano | 3:58 |
| 3. | "Suki ni Naru Crescendo" (好きになるクレッシェンド; lit. 'Crescendo of Falling in Love') | Kenta Urashima, Ryota Kato | 4:04 |
| 4. | "Cliffhanger" (instrumental) | Katsuhiko Sugiyama | 4:16 |
| 5. | "Kimi to Ikiru" (instrumental) | Chiaki Nagasawa, Saori Nagano | 3:58 |
| 6. | "Suki ni Naru Crescendo" (instrumental) | Kenta Urashima, Ryota Kato | 4:03 |

Type B
| No. | Title | Music | Length |
|---|---|---|---|
| 3. | "Surf's Up Girl" | Takafumi Fujino | 3:38 |
| 6. | "Surf's Up Girl" (instrumental) | Takafumi Fujino | 3:38 |

Type C
| No. | Title | Music | Length |
|---|---|---|---|
| 3. | "Namidame no Taiyō" (涙目の太陽; lit. 'Tearful Sun') | Atsushi | 5:10 |
| 6. | "Namidame no Taiyō" (instrumental) | Atsushi | 5:10 |

Type D
| No. | Title | Music | Length |
|---|---|---|---|
| 3. | "Koi to Kansei no Hōsoku" (恋と慣性の法則; lit. 'Love and the Law of Inertia') | Atsushi | 4:03 |
| 6. | "Koi to Kansei no Hōsoku" (instrumental) | Atsushi | 4:02 |

Regular
| No. | Title | Music | Length |
|---|---|---|---|
| 3. | "Second Jump" | barbora, TomoLow | 4:27 |
| 6. | "Second Jump" (instrumental) | barbora, TomoLow | 4:25 |

=== Blu-ray ===
==== Type A ====
Hinatazaka46 Arena Tour 2025 “MONSTER GROOVE” — Director's Cut Collections (Part 1)

1. “Overture”
2. “No War in the future 2020”
3. “Yūhi Dance”
4. “Kitsune”
5. “Kimi wa Honey Dew”
6. “Love yourself!”

==== Type B ====
Hinatazaka46 Arena Tour 2025 “MONSTER GROOVE” — Director's Cut Collections (Part 2)

1. “Soratobu Kuruma”
2. “Koishita Sakana wa Sora wo Tobu”
3. “Naze”
4. “Sonota Ōzei Type”
5. “Halloween no Kabocha ga Wareta 2025”
6. “Ano Ko ni Gui Gui”
7. “Suki to Iu Koto wa…”

==== Type C ====
Hinatazaka46 Arena Tour 2025 “MONSTER GROOVE” — Director's Cut Collections (Part 3)

1. “Additional Time”
2. “Mita Koto Nai Mamonо”
3. “Ai wa Kocchi no Mono da 2025”
4. “Onegai Bach!”
5. “Zettaiteki Dairokkan”
6. “Expected Value”

==== Type D ====
Hinata no Uragawa: the other side of HINATA, Hinatazaka46 Arena Tour 2025 “MONSTER GROOVE” @ Osaka-jō Hall

== Personnel ==
Lineups obtained from official website.

=== "Cliffhanger" ===
Center: Manami Ōno

- 1st row: Nao Kosaka, Manami Ōno, Yōko Shōgenji
- 2nd row: Sakura Matsuo, Kaho Fujishima, Konoka Matsuda, Miku Kanemura, Mikuni Takahashi
- 3rd row: Nanami Konishi, Sumire Miyachi, Rina Watanabe, Haruka Yamashita, Rio Shimizu, Rika Takai

=== "Kimi to Ikiru" ===
Center: Hinano Kamimura

- 1st row: Honoka Hirao, Hinano Kamimura, Tamaki Ishizuka
- 2nd row: Saki Katayama, Haruyo Yamaguchi, Yu Satō, Marie Morimoto, Niko Tsurusaki
- 3rd row: Nina Sakai, Izuki Shimoda, Kirari Takeuchi, Mitsuki Hiraoka, Hinano Kuramori, Mizuki Ōta

=== "Suki ni Naru Crescendo" ===
Center: Saki Katayama

- 1st row: Hinano Kuramori, Nina Sakai, Saki Katayama, Izuki Shimoda, Mizuki Ōta
- 2nd row: Rika Takai, Sakura Matsuo, Manami Ōno, Yu Satō, Niko Tsurusaki

=== "Surf's Up Girl" ===
Center: Kirari Takeuchi

- 1st row: Tamaki Ishizuka, Kirari Takeuchi, Mitsuki Hiraoka
- 2nd row: Yokō Shōgenji, Kaho Fujishima, Rina Watanabe, Honoka Hirao
- 3rd row: Rio Shimizu, Haruka Yamashita, Sumire Miyachi, Nanami Konishi

=== "Namidame no Taiyō" ===
All members perform

=== "Koi to Kansei no Hōsoku" ===
Sumire Miyachi, Rina Watanabe

=== "Second Jump" ===
Same as "Cliffhanger"

== Charts ==
=== Weekly charts ===
Weekly chart performance for "Cliffhanger"
| Chart (2026) | Peak position |
|---|---|
| Japan (Japan Hot 100) | 3 |
| Japan (Oricon) | 1 |
| Japan Combined Singles (Oricon) | 1 |
| Japanese Digital Albums (Oricon) | 1 |

=== Monthly charts ===
Monthly chart performance for "Cliffhanger"
| Chart | Position |
|---|---|
| Japan (Oricon) | 1 |
