= Kimi wa Honeydew =

- Regular edition

Single by Hinatazaka46
- English title: You Are Honeydew
- Released: May 11, 2024
- Genre: J-pop
- Label: Sony Music Entertainment Japan
- Lyricist: Yasushi Akimoto
- Producer: Yasushi Akimoto

Hinatazaka46 singles chronology
"Am I Ready?" (2023)	"Kimi wa Honeydew" (2024)	"Zettaiteki Dairokkan" (2024)

Music video
- "Kimi wa Honeydew" on YouTube
- "Sabitsukanai Ken o Mote!" on YouTube
- "Boku ni Tsuzuke" on YouTube
- "Ame ga Futtatte" on YouTube

"Kimi wa Honeydew" (Japanese: 君はハニーデュー, Hepburn: Kimi wa Hanīdyū; lit. 'You Are Honeydew') is the 11th single by Japanese girl group Hinatazaka46, released on May 8, 2024, by Sony Music Entertainment Japan. It features the first appearance of Yōko Shōgenji as the lead performer of a title song. The title song is the first by the group to utilize a senbatsu (選抜, lit. 'selection') system for its lineup and to feature selected fourth generation members of the group. The single debuted atop the weekly Oricon Singles Chart with over 448,000 sales.

== Production and release ==
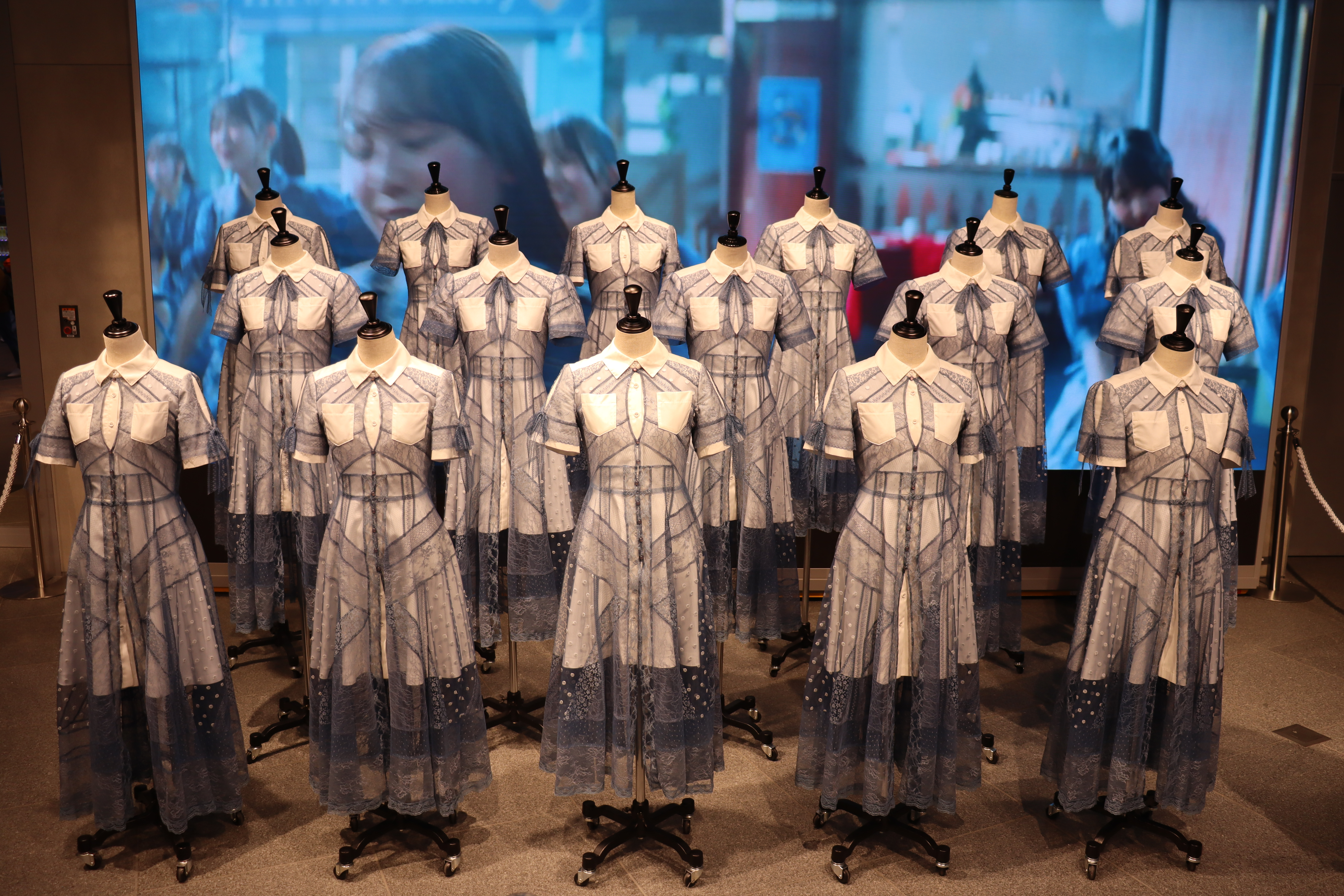
Costumes worn in the "Kimi wa Honeydew" music video

On February 23, 2024, Hinatazaka46 announced that it would release its 11th single on April 10. The title song formation was announced on the February 26 broadcast of the group's variety show, Hinatazaka de Aimashō, with fourth generation member Yōko Shōgenji appointed center (lead performer) for the first time. The title, "Kimi wa Honeydew", was announced on March 20.

"Kimi wa Honeydew" is the first Hinatazaka46 single to implement a senbatsu (選抜, lit. 'selection') system, where only selected members from the group's four generations perform the title song. This is in contrast to the group's previous releases, where all active first to third-generation members participated in the title songs, while the fourth-generation members, whose first music release is on the eighth single, only performed their generation's B-sides. With this new system, Yōko Shōgenji became the first title song center from her generation. Apart from Shōgenji, all members on the front row of the song's choreography (Mirei Sasaki, Nao Kosaka, Miku Kanemura, and Shiho Katō) had also been centers for previous title songs. Members who were not selected are referred to as Hiragana Hinatazaka46 (ひなた坂46), similar to Hinatazaka46's former name Hiragana Keyakizaka46 (けやき坂46), and would perform their own B-side song.

The single is the first to be released after the departures of Sarina Ushio and Honoka Kishi in December 2023. Kyōko Saitō also did not participate in the title song, as she was scheduled to leave the group before its release, and was instead appointed the center of the B-side "Boku ni Tsuzuke", the first Hinatazaka46 song performed by all first to fourth generation members.

The release date of "Kimi wa Honeydew" was postponed to May 8, 2024, (Note: Coinciding with the eighth anniversary of Hiragana Keyakizaka46, the predecessor group to Hinatazaka46) due to unspecified production issues. The title song was released on streaming services on March 22 (Japan time). The title song was first performed live on the first day of the 5th Hinatansai anniversary concert at the Yokohama Stadium on April 6.

== Track listing ==
1. "Kimi wa Honeydew"
2. "Sabitsukanai Ken o Mote!" (Note: 錆つかない剣を持て!; lit. 'Have a Sword That Won't Rust!')
3. Different tracks on each edition:
  - Type-A: "Doko Made ga Michi Nanda?" (Note: どこまでが道なんだ?; lit. 'How Far Is the Road?')
  - Type-B: "Koi to An-butter" (Note: 恋とあんバター; lit. 'Love and Anko-butter')
  - Type-C: "Yoake no Speed" (Note: 夜明けのスピード; lit. 'Dawn Speed')
  - Type-D: "Ame ga Futtatte" (Note: 雨が降ったって; lit. 'It's Raining')
  - Regular: "Boku ni Tsuzuke" (Note: 僕に続け; lit. 'Follow Me')
4. "Kimi wa Honeydew" (off vocal ver.)
5. Off-vocal versions of track 3

== Personnel ==
Formations obtained from official website.

=== "Kimi wa Honeydew" ===
Center: Yōko Shōgenji

- 1st row: Mirei Sasaki, Nao Kosaka, Yōko Shōgenji, Miku Kanemura, Shiho Katō
- 2nd row: Hina Kawata, Kaho Fujishima, Akari Nibu, Sumire Miyachi, Konoka Matsuda
- 3rd row: Kumi Sasaki, Mei Higashimura, Honoka Hirao, Haruka Yamashita, Hinano Kamimura, Suzuka Tomita

=== "Sabitsukanai Ken o Mote!" ===
Center: Mikuni Takahashi

- 1st row: Ayaka Takamoto, Mikuni Takahashi, Hiyori Hamagishi
- 2nd row: Nanami Konishi, Haruyo Yamaguchi, Marie Morimoto, Rio Shimizu
- 3rd row: Kirari Takeuchi, Rina Watanabe, Mana Takase, Tamaki Ishizuka, Mitsuki Hiraoka

=== "Doko Made ga Michi Nanda?" ===
Mitsuki Hiraoka, Haruyo Yamaguchi, Miku Kanemura, Mikuni Takahashi

=== "Koi to An-butter" ===
Honoka Hirao, Marie Morimoto, Hina Kawata, Kaho Fujishima

=== "Yoake no Speed" ===
Haruka Yamashita, Yoko Shogenji, Nao Kosaka, Hinano Kamimura

=== "Ame ga Futtatte" ===
Center: Nanami Konishi

- 1st row: Rina Watanabe, Nanami Konishi, Mitsuki Hiraoka
- 2nd row: Rio Shimizu, Honoka Hirao, Haruka Yamashita, Sumire Miyachi
- 3rd row: Tamaki Ishizuka, Yoko Shogenji, Kaho Fujishima, Kirari Takeuchi

=== "Boku ni Tsuzuke" ===
Center: Kyoko Saito

- 1st row: Kyoko Saito
- 2nd row: Shiho Kato, Kumi Sasaki, Mirei Sasaki, Mana Takase, Ayaka Takamoto, Mei Higashimura
- 3rd row: Miku Kanemura, Hina Kawata, Nao Kosaka, Suzuka Tomita, Akari Nibu, Hiyori Hamagishi, Konoka Matsuda
- 4th row: Hinano Kamimura, Mikuni Takahashi, Marie Morimoto, Haruyo Yamaguchi
- 5th row: Tamaki Ishizuka, Nanami Konishi, Rio Shimizu, Yoko Shogenji, Kirari Takeuchi, Honoka Hirao, Mitsuki Hirao, Kaho Fujishima, Sumire Miyachi, Haruka Yamashita, Rina Watanabe

== Charts ==
=== Weekly charts ===
Weekly chart performance for "Kimi wa Honeydew"
Chart (2024)	Peak position
Japan (Japan Hot 100)	3
Japan (Oricon)	1
Japan Combined Singles (Oricon)	1
Japanese Digital Albums (Oricon)	3

=== Monthly charts ===
Monthly chart performance for "Kimi wa Honeydew"
Chart (2024)	Position
Japan (Oricon)	3

=== Year-end charts ===
Year-end chart performance for "Kimi wa Honeydew"
Chart (2024)	Position
Japan Top Singles Sales (Billboard Japan)	21
Japan (Oricon)	15

== Certifications ==
Certifications for "Kimi wa Honeydew"
Region	Certification	Certified units/sales
Japan (RIAJ)	2× Platinum	500,000^{^}
^{^} Shipments figures based on certification alone.
