= Mao Ioki =

Japanese singer and media personality (born 2005)

- 五百城 茉央
- Ioki in 2024
- Born: July 29, 2005 (age 21); Hyogo Prefecture, Japan
- Occupations: Singer; media personality
- Years active: 2022–present
- Height: 166 cm (5 ft 5 in)
- Relatives: Yōko Shōgenji (cousin)
- Musical career
- Genre: J-pop
- Instruments: Vocals
- Label: Sony Music
- Member of: Nogizaka46
- Website: Official website

Mao Ioki (Japanese: 五百城 茉央, Hepburn: Ioki Mao; born July 29, 2005) is a Japanese singer and media personality. She is a member of the idol girl group Nogizaka46.

== Career ==
Ioki was revealed as one of the 11 new Nogizaka46 fifth-generation members on February 9, 2022. Aside from her work with the group, she has provided narration for the documentary Watashi no Tsugaku Road (2023−2024) and starred in the high school mystery drama Madder (2024), both on Kansai Television, and made her voice acting debut as an aspiring idol character in the NHK Educational TV anime series Hanakappa from October 2025 to February 2026. Her first photobook, titled Mirai no Tsukurikata (未来の作り方; lit. 'How to Create the Future') and photographed in Lisbon, Portugal, was published by Shogakukan on January 21, 2025 and sold 94,000 copies through the year, placing it third on the Oricon Annual Book Ranking after the photobooks by fellow Nogizaka46 members Nagi Inoue and Yūki Yoda.

== Personal life ==
Ioki is cousins with Hinatazaka46 member Yōko Shōgenji, who also joined that group in 2022.

== Filmography ==
=== Television ===
Year	Title	Role	Notes	Ref(s)
2023−24	Watashi no Tsugaku Road	Narrator		
2024	Madder	Akane Nakano	Lead role	
2025−26	Hanakappa	Maorin (voice)		
