= All of Tokyo! =

2024 Japanese film directed by Kazuyoshi Kumakiri

- Theatrical release poster
- Katakana: ゼンブ・オブ・トーキョー
- Romanization: Zenbu of Tokyo
- Revised Hepburn: Zenbu obu Tōkyō
- Directed by: Kazuyoshi Kumakiri
- Screenplay by: Shōhei Fukuda; Ryōichi Tsuchiya
- Produced by: Tsuyoshi Matsushita; Mitsuru Uda; Kazumasa Watanabe
- Starring: Yōko Shōgenji; Rina Watanabe; Kaho Fujishima; and others
- Cinematography: Taku Kobayashi
- Edited by: Daisuke Imai
- Music by: Shōji Ikenaga
- Distributed by: Gaga Corporation
- Release date: October 25, 2024 (Japan)
- Running time: 87 minutes
- Country: Japan
- Language: Japanese
- Box office: $251,000

All of Tokyo! (Japanese: ゼンブ・オブ・トーキョー, Hepburn: Zenbu obu Tōkyō) is a 2024 Japanese film directed by Kazuyoshi Kumakiri and written by Shōhei Fukuda and Ryōichi Tsuchiya. The film stars all 11 members of Hinatazaka46's fourth generation as high school students on a school trip to Tokyo. The film was distributed in Japan by Gaga Corporation and released on October 25, 2024.

== Plot ==
During a school trip to Tokyo, high school student Yurika Ikezono is determined to make the most of the group's free day. As the leader of her group, she has prepared a detailed itinerary intended to allow them to visit as many of Tokyo's attractions as possible.

However, when the day of free activity arrives, the members of the group unexpectedly go their separate ways. Ikezono finds herself alone beneath the Tokyo Skytree, and initially wonders whether the situation might be the result of a parallel world or reincarnation. She nevertheless decides to continue following the itinerary she had prepared.

While Ikezono visits the city's attractions, the other members pursue their own reasons for coming to Tokyo. Megu Hagawa stalks her crush together with her love rival, Mio Tsujisaka; Shiori Setta, Wakana Tsunomora, Akane Yanatori, and Moe Kadobayashi hunt for limited-edition items; former Tokyo resident Ayano Masutani, originally just intending to take a stroll around the city, ends up struggling to impress her admirer, Miyuki Hanasato, with the help of her old friend Yumeka Mitsutake; and the quiet Chisa Kirii secretly intends to pursue her dream of becoming an idol. As they adventure through the city, their individual pursuits eventually bring them back into contact with one another.

== Cast ==
The principal cast consists of the 11 members of Hinatazaka46's fourth generation, all of whom made their film acting debuts in the film. Listed in order of credit.

- Yōko Shōgenji as Yurika Ikezono (池園優里香), the group's leader
- Rina Watanabe as Chisa Kirii (桐井智紗)
- Kaho Fujishima as Megu Hagawa (羽川恵)
- Tamaki Ishizuka as Shiori Setta (説田詩央里)
- Nanami Konishi as Ayano Masutani (枡谷綾乃)
- Kirari Takeuchi as Mio Tsujisaka (辻坂美緒)
- Honoka Hirao as Miyuki Hanasato (花里深雪)
- Mitsuki Hiraoka as Yumeka Mitsutake (満武夢華)
- Rio Shimizu as Wakana Tsunomura (角村若菜)
- Sumire Miyachi as Akane Yanatori (梁取茜)
- Haruka Yamashita as Moe Kadobayashi (門林萌絵)
- Nao Kosaka as Rin Arikawa (有川凛), an idol admired by Chisa
- Satoshi Yashima as Kenji Hinuma (日沼健二), the students' teacher
- Sei Matobu as Kanae Igarashi (五十嵐佳苗), a taxi driver involved in the students' trip

== Production ==
All of Tokyo! was directed by Kazuyoshi Kumakiri, while Shōhei Fukuda and Ryōichi Tsuchiya wrote the screenplay. Having been impressed with boy band Hey! Say! JUMP member Yuto Nakajima, the leading man of his 2023 film #Manhole, Kumakiri expressed interest in creating an "idol movie" in his own style. Producer Tsuyoshi Matsushita, who had previously worked with Hinatazaka46 member Mirei Sasaki on the 2021 Kakegurui Twin live-action television series, proposed the idea of a film starring the group's members. The "refreshing" teen film has been described as a "new frontier" and the "complete opposite" of his previous works, which have been "gritty", realistic stories and "high-concept" thrillers.

According to Eiga.com, Fukuda and Tsuchiya interviewed all the Hinatazaka46 fourth-generation members during the project's development, asking about their school memories, experiences before entering the entertainment industry, and feelings about Tokyo. These interviews were incorporated into an original screenplay designed around the personalities and experiences of the cast; Real Sound described the film as an ensemble work built around the distinctive personalities of the 11 members.

The film was announced on August 1, 2024. The members played schoolgirls visiting Tokyo on a school trip, with Yōko Shōgenji in the leading role of Ikezono. Additional cast members Nao Kosaka, Satoshi Yashima and Sei Matobu were announced in September. Kosaka played Arikawa, the idol admired by Watanabe's character, while Yashima played the students' teacher and Matobu played a taxi driver who becomes involved in their trip. On August 5, a few days after the film's announcement, Hinatazaka46 opened applications for its fifth-generation members.

== Release ==
All of Tokyo! was released theatrically in Japan on October 25, 2024, distributed by Gaga Corporation. A theatrical release campaign included audience giveaways featuring character postcards corresponding to the 11 fourth-generation members. A commemorative stage greeting was held in Tokyo on October 26, the day after the film's theatrical release, attended by the 11 cast members and Kumakiri.

In 2025 and 2026, special birthday screenings were held to coincide with the birthdays of the 11 fourth-generation members, with exclusive postcards distributed at the screenings. The film was released on Netflix Japan on May 11, 2026.

== Reception ==
=== Critical response ===
Writing for Eiga.com, film critic Atsushi Ushizu described the combination of Kumakiri and the 11 fourth-generation members as an "effective pairing" and praised All of Tokyo! for "extracting" the distinctive qualities of each member while weaving them into a light youth ensemble story.

Writing for Real Sound, Yuichi Mase characterized the film as a "showcase" for the fourth-generation members and remarked that its appeal lay in the youthful energy and individual personalities of its cast. He also connected the film's depiction of Tokyo with the feelings of people from outside the capital who view the city as a destination of aspiration.

Writing for Cinema Today, Kurei Hibiki likewise described the film as a showcase for Hinatazaka46's fourth generation and accessible even to those unfamiliar with the group, while expressing reservations about its depiction of Tokyo in 2024. Meanwhile, Kentaro Muramatsu praised the more traditional coming-of-age "idol movie" style, in contrast to contemporary works starring idols that tended to avoid such direction, and the equal portrayal of the ensemble cast. Both reviewers gave the film 3 out of 5 stars.

== Music ==
All of Tokyo!'s theme song, "Kyūkōken to Rhythm" (急行券とリズム, Kyūkōken to Rizumu; lit. 'Express Ticket and Rhythm'), was written and performed by the rock band Conton Candy. The band's vocalist, Tsumugi, is a Hinatazaka46 fan, and the song was written specifically for the film and released in conjunction with its theatrical release. Yōko Shōgenji starred in the music video. Aside from the original theme song, the main cast's own work in Hinatazaka46, "Ame ga Futtatte" from their 11th single, is also briefly played in a scene set in Harajuku.

== Sequel ==
A sequel titled Zenbu of World (ゼンブ・オブ・ワールド) was announced on February 20, 2026, coinciding with Kirari Takeuchi's 20th birthday. The first teaser trailer was released on November 10 and the release date has been set for February 26, 2027.
