= Kichiku Dai Enkai =

- DVD cover
- Directed by: Kazuyoshi Kumakiri
- Written by: Kazuyoshi Kumakiri
- Produced by: Kazuyoshi Kumakiri; Tomohiro Zaizen
- Starring: Shigeru Bokuda; Sumiko Mikami; Shunsuke Sawada; Toshiyuki Sugihara
- Cinematography: Kiyoaki Hashimoto
- Edited by: Kazuyoshi Kumakiri
- Music by: Akainu
- Release date: September 1, 1997 (Japan)
- Running time: 100 minutes
- Country: Japan
- Language: Japanese

Kichiku Dai Enkai (Japanese: 鬼畜大宴会; lit. Banquet of the Beasts) is a 1997 Japanese film. It was written and directed by Kazuyoshi Kumakiri.

== Story ==
In the year 1972, a small group of left-wing students are living at a dingy apartment in the mountain village of Karuizawa in Nagano-ken, Japan. While the group leader, Aizawa, waits to be released from prison, his promiscuous girlfriend, Masami, is left in charge. While waiting for Aizawa's release, Masami uses her overt sexuality and engages in promiscuity with the fellow students. As the days pass by things take a tragic turn. Within a few days of his release, the group's leader commits hara-kiri. After learning of Aizawa's suicide, the shotgun toting Masami loses control and the group quickly falls into self-destruction as sex, distrust, paranoia, and violence overtakes them.

== Cast ==
- Sumiko Mikami
- Shigeru Bokuda
- Shunsuke Sawada
- Toshiyuki Sugihara
- Kiyoaki Hashimoto
- Sanae Ishida
- Yukio Yoshikawa
- Yuji Hashimoto
- Tetsuya Higashino
- Manabu Senda
- Taira Tsutomu
- Tomohiro Zaimae
- Kentaro Ogiso

== See also ==
- Hiroko Nagata
