= That Time I Got Reincarnated as a Slime the Movie: Tears of the Azure Sea =

2026 Japanese animated fantasy film

- Theatrical release poster
- Kanji: 劇場版 転生したらスライムだった件 蒼海の涙編
- Revised Hepburn: Gekijōban Tensei Shitara Suraimu Datta Ken: Sōkai no Namida-hen
- Directed by: Yasuhito Kikuchi
- Screenplay by: Yasuhito Kikuchi; Toshizo Nemoto
- Story by: Fuse
- Based on: That Time I Got Reincarnated as a Slime by Fuse
- Starring: Starring: Miho Okasaki; Saori Ōnishi; Nao Kosaka; Kaho Fujishima; Makoto Furukawa; M.A.O; Takahiro Sakurai
- Music by: Hitoshi Fujima (Elements Garden)
- Production company: Eight Bit
- Distributed by: Bandai Namco Filmworks
- Release date: February 27, 2026 (Japan)
- Running time: 105 minutes
- Country: Japan
- Language: Japanese
- Box office: $8 million

That Time I Got Reincarnated as a Slime the Movie: Tears of the Azure Sea (Japanese: 劇場版 転生したらスライムだった件 蒼海の涙編, Hepburn: Gekijōban Tensei Shitara Suraimu Datta Ken: Sōkai no Namida-hen) is a 2026 Japanese animated fantasy film based on the light novel series by Fuse. Produced by Eight Bit and distributed by Bandai Namco Filmworks, it is the second theatrical film in the franchise, following That Time I Got Reincarnated as a Slime the Movie: Scarlet Bond (2022).

The film features an original story written by Fuse and acts as a bridge between the third and fourth seasons of the television series. It was released in Japan on February 27, 2026, with a global rollout by Crunchyroll through Sony Pictures Releasing starting in April 2026.

== Plot ==
In the underwater Kingdom of Kaien, a woman named Yura steals a magical flute called the Dragon's Fang and escapes from the kingdom.

A month after the conclusion of the Tempest Founder's Festival, Rimuru Tempest and his companions accept an invitation from Elmesia El-Ru Sarion, the Celestial Emperor of the Sorcerous Dynasty Thalion, for a vacation at a private resort. Rimuru also learns of recent nuclear magic attacks targeting Leon Cromwell's domain, who constantly deflects them, resulting in them hitting Kaien instead, though the kingdom survives thanks to a force field. Yura eventually arrives at the island and meets Gobta. The two fight off men led by Zodon, who was sent by Djeese, a minster from Kaien, to get the Dragon's Fang back. They manage to get away, but lose the flute in the process. After Zodon brings the Dragon's Fang to Djeese, he reveals his plan to awaken the mystical water dragon that protects the city to launch an attack on the surface world, using the flute to control it.

Rimuru and his friends meet Yura and learn about the ancient history of Kaien and the water dragon. Rimuru, along with half of his friends, set off to Kaien. Djeese and the water dragon ambush them along the way. During the fight, Djeese loses the flute, which Yura catches. Djeese is seemly eaten by the water dragon as it leaves. Yura heads back to Kaien to return the Dragon's Fang to its place while Rimuru, Shion, Ranga, and Gobta follow her. However, the flute breaks, causing the water dragon to disappear. Following a tour of the Kaien, Rimuru and his friends decide to stay for the night.

Djeese is revealed to have survived, but Zodon kills him, having been using him all along. Zodon then captures Yura and puts her in a trance, intending to marry her for his plan to conquer the world, revealing that Yura is a major part of the water dragon. The revived water dragon attacks the Resort Island and Kaien is brought to the surface. The dragon also summons clones of itself. As Rimuru and his friends fight the dragons, Gobta manages to free Yura from her trance. Rimuru eventually kills Zodon using a powerful attack from the sky.

The next day, Gobta confesses his love to Yura, but she reveals that she has no romantic interest in him at all before leaving, to Gobta's anger; the two remain friends though. Back in Kaien, Yura reveals that she doesn't just control the water dragon's core, she is the core itself, who was reborn multiple times over the years and she dissolves into bubbles. Gobta hopes to see Yura again someday.

In the post credit scene, an egg washes to shore and the newborn baby water dragon hatches from it. Meanwhile, Diablo has defeated the primordial Jaune and she learns that he works for Rimuru. Jaune takes an interest in Rimuru.

== Voice cast ==
Character	Japanese Voice Actor	English Voice Actor	Description
Rimuru Tempest	Miho Okasaki	Brittany Karbowski	The protagonist; a Demon Lord and founder of Tempest.
Raphael	Megumi Toyoguchi	Mallorie Rodak	Raphael is Rimuru's Unique Skill, a type of artificial intelligence that exists within their mind and serves as their personal advisor and assistant.
Yura	Saori Ōnishi	Allegra Clark	A priestess of the undersea kingdom of Kaien.
Mio	Nao Kosaka	Natalie Van Sistine	A maid and bodyguard serving Yura.
Yori	Kaho Fujishima	Marianne Bray	A maid and bodyguard serving Yura.
Benimaru	Makoto Furukawa	Ricco Fajardo	General of the Tempest forces.
Shion	M.A.O.	Michelle Rojas	Rimuru's secretary and bodyguard.
Diablo	Takahiro Sakurai	Daman Mills	One of the Primordial Demons serving Rimuru.
Souei	Takuya Eguchi	Ian Sinclair	Rimuru's main spy and infiltrator.
Shuna	Sayaka Senbongi	Tia Ballard	A healer and ogre princess serving Rimuru.
Hakuro	Hōchū Ōtsuka	Charlie Campbell	An older ogre and genius swordsmaster serving Rimuru.
Gobta	Asuna Tomari	Ryan Reynolds	One of Rimuru's youngest and strongest hobgoblin servants.
Ranga	Chikahiro Kobayashi	Tyson Rinehart	Ranga is a dire wolf serving Rimuru.
Treyni	Rie Tanaka	Jamie Marchi	The leader of the dryads, the protectors of the Great Forest of Jura, Rimuru's domain.
Veldora	Tomoaki Maeno	Chris Rager	The great Storm Dragon and Rimuru's partner.
Ramiris	Anzu Haruno	Jad Saxton	A fairy and former Spirit Queen, as well as one of the oldest True Demon Lords.
Beretta	Ayako Kawasumi	Morgan Lauré	A golem created from the soul of a Greater Demon to serve Rimuru and Ramiris.
Elyun Grimwald	Akane Kumada	Natalie Hoover	An elf princess and adventurer Mage friend of Rimuru's.
Luminous Valentine	Lynn	Jill Harris	A Vampire True Demon Lord and leader of the Western Holy Empire.
Hinata Sakaguchi	Manami Numakura	Alexis Tipton	An Otherworlder and the greatest knight of the Western Holy Empire.
Milim Nava	Rina Hidaka	Kristen McGuire	A dragonoid and one of the strongest and most ancient True Demon Lords.
Frey	Sayaka Ohara	Lisa Ortiz	A Harpy known as the Sky Queen and a former Demon Lord.
Elmesia	Hisako Kanemoto	Amber Lee Connors	The Celestial Emperor of the Sorcerous Dynasty of Thalion.
Leon Cromwell	Jun Fukuyama	Christopher Wehkamp	A summoned Otherworlder and a former True Hero who became a Demon Lord.

== Production ==
The film was officially announced on September 27, 2024, following the finale of the anime's third season. Eight Bit returned for the animation, under the direction of Yasuhito Kikuchi. The production utilized advanced water-physics CGI to render the underwater kingdom of Kaien, a first for the franchise.

== Music ==
The film's soundtrack is composed by Hitoshi Fujima of Elements Garden.

=== Theme song ===
"Eutopia" by TRUE

=== Insert songs ===
"Soukoku" ("Conflict") by Saori Ōnishi

"Harmonics" by Stereo Dive Foundation ft. ASH

"Renai No" by ARCANA PROJECT

== Release ==
The film released in Japan on February 27, 2026, including IMAX and 4D formats via Bandai Namco Filmworks. A special commemorative CD single, "Soukai no Yurameki," will be released on February 28. International distribution rights are held by Crunchyroll via Sony Pictures Releasing, with a planned North American theatrical window of May–June 2026. Muse Asia will release the movie in Southeast Asia and India in 2026.
