= Yōko Shōgenji =

Japanese singer and media personality

- 正源司 陽子
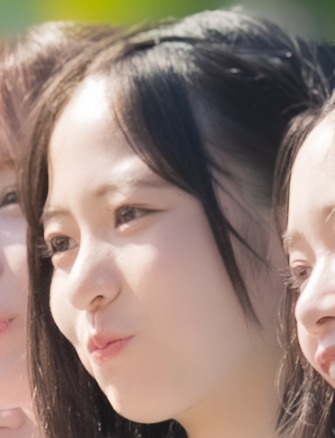
- Shōgenji in 2024
- Born: February 14, 2007 (age 19); Hyogo Prefecture, Japan
- Occupations: Singer; media personality
- Years active: 2022–present
- Height: 158.4 cm (5 ft 2.4 in)
- Relatives: Mao Ioki (cousin)
- Musical career
- Genre: J-pop
- Instruments: Vocals; guitar; Western concert flute
- Label: Sony Music Entertainment Japan
- Member of: Hinatazaka46
- Website: Official website

Yōko Shōgenji (Japanese: 正源司 陽子, Hepburn: Shōgenji Yōko; born February 14, 2007) is a Japanese singer and media personality. She is a member of the girl group Hinatazaka46.

Shōgenji joined Hinatazaka46 in 2022 and has served as the lead performer for the singles "Kimi wa Honeydew" (2024), "Zettaiteki Dairokkan" (2024), and "Ichaicha Mushi" (2026). She has also been a co-host for the NHK High School Courses educational show and starred in the feature film All of Tokyo! (2024). She has been the regular Thursday host of the All Night Nippon X radio program since April 2026.

== Early life ==
Shōgenji hails from Ashiya, Hyōgo Prefecture, and has an older sister. She grew up "surrounded by music" with several family members who played musical instruments, and started practicing the piano from age three and the Western concert flute in her middle school's brass band club. She had always been interested in working in music and performance, although not specifically as an idol. She practiced karate regularly until middle school and holds a brown belt. Her surname has been noted for its rarity, with only around 50 individuals in Japan sharing it.

== Career ==
=== 2022−2024: Early career ===
Shōgenji joined Hinatazaka46 in late 2022 as a fourth generation member and was the second youngest among the twelve new members at age 15. She was inspired to audition for the group after her cousin Mao Ioki joined Nogizaka46 earlier that year. Her introduction documentary video was published on October 14, 2022, on the group's official YouTube channel. She played the flute during the fourth generation members' Omotenashikai live event.

From 2023 to 2024, Shōgenji was a co-host for the "Informatics I" subject (a compulsory Japanese high school subject since 2022) of NHK Educational TV's NHK High School Courses (NHK高校講座, NHK Kōkō Kōza) educational show. As an anime enthusiast, she co-hosts Hinatazaka Anime Club, a variety show about learning anime production broadcast irregularly on Kansai TV since 2023.

Shōgenji became a song center (lead performer) for the first time for the fourth generation's song "Coelacanth", released on the 2023 single "One Choice". She made her live music program debut on TV Asahi's Christmas special edition of Music Station, Super Live 2023, as the substitute center for the group's live performance of "One Choice", where her "extreme nervousness" and the encouraging yells by Kazuya Ohashi of boy group Naniwa Danshi became a highlight.

=== 2024−2026: First title song center positions, acting debut ===
Shōgenji, along with Nao Kosaka and Miku Kanemura, was a subject for the Triangle Magazine 02 photo collection, or "visual magazine", published by Kodansha on January 23, 2024. Among the three models, she represented the theme of "youth". It placed first on both the Oricon Weekly Book and Photobook charts of its release week with 61 thousand copies sold.

Shōgenji was the center of Hinatazaka46's 11th single, "Kimi wa Honeydew", released on May 8, 2024, and is the first fourth generation member to be a title song center. She was again announced as center for the 12th single, "Zettaiteki Dairokkan", released on September 18, along with fellow fourth generation member Kaho Fujishima, making both of them the first double centers of a Hinatazaka46 title song. In the Tokyo leg of the 2025 Monster Groove tour, she played the electric guitar to accompany performances of "My Fans".

Shōgenji and Fujishima, fourth generation members of the same age, have been described as two of the group's emerging "leading figures" and are frequently paired together as the duo "Shogekaho". They co-starred in the 2024 web commercial series Ice de Breakers for Morinaga & Company's Ice Box brand, and in 2025 and 2026 in a television commercial series for Sony Assurance (ソニー損保, Sony Sonpo), where they portrayed three sisters with series regular Nao Kosaka.

Shōgenji made her film debut as the lead of 2024's All of Tokyo! (ゼンブ・オブ・トーキョー, Zenbu obu Tōkyō), with an ensemble cast of Hinatazaka46 fourth generation members and directed by Kazuyoshi Kumakiri. She also starred in the music video of its theme song, "Kyūkōken to Rhythm" by Conton Candy. In an interview, Kumakiri remarked that Shōgenji had been selected for the lead role as she could express various "colors".

Shōgenji collaborated in earnest with her cousin, Mao Ioki of Nogizaka46, for the first time on a two-part video published in May 2024 on their groups' YouTube channels, Nogizaka Haishinchū and Hinatazaka Channel, in which they spend time together in an old Japanese-style house. As a GeGeGe no Kitarō fan, she was also one of the public figures appointed in 2025 to select episodes to be broadcast on GeGeGe no Kitarō: Watashi no Aishita Rekidai GeGeGe (ゲゲゲの鬼太郎 私の愛した歴代ゲゲゲ; lit. 'GeGeGe no Kitarō: My Beloved GeGeGe Over the Years'), a special series to commemorate the 10th anniversary of creator Shigeru Mizuki's death.

Shōgenji made her solo radio debut in a special August 2025 broadcast of All Night Nippon 0 (Zero) on Nippon Broadcasting System, during which she spontaneously abandoned her prepared material to talk about ghost stories. In October, she co-hosted a broadcast of Tokyo Speakeasy on Tokyo FM with Mao Ioki and guested on All Night Nippon X (Cross), hosted by fellow Hinatazaka46 member Konoka Matsuda. In January 2026, she appeared as a guest on voice actress Ayane Sakura's Ayane Sakura: Logic × Lonely (Note: 佐倉綾音 論理×ロンリー, Sakura Ayane Ronri × Ronrī) radio program on TBS Radio. Shōgenji had admired Sakura since middle school and had portrayed the character Yotsuba Nakano in Hinatazaka46's 2024 stage adaptation of The Quintessential Quintuplets, whom Sakura had voiced in the preceding anime adaptation. Sakura later humorously designated Shōgenji as her "official younger sister (dog?)", nicknamed "Yokoshire Terrier".

=== 2026−present: All Night Nippon X, anime song ===
Shōgenji became a regular in the long-running All Night Nippon radio franchise as the Thursday host for All Night Nippon X in April 2026, taking over from Konoka Matsuda, who herself transitioned to All Night Nippon 0. To help her with her new role, Matsuda gifted her a notebook and showed her how she developed material for her broadcasts, while encouraging her to “speak whatever was on [her] mind”. At the announcement event in March, she met Sakanaction vocalist and guitarist Ichiro Yamaguchi, who would also begin hosting the main All Night Nippon program on Tuesdays, and the two bonded over their shared interest in guitar playing and supernatural stories. Writing for Bubka, entertainment writer Shin remarked on her adaptability and contrasted Matsuda's well-structured broadcasts to her "forceful" and "passionate" style, later comparing her to an unpredictable "fantasista" football player. The radio program supports the "Naked Meets Nijō Castle 2026" art exhibition in Kyoto, held on October 23−December 5, with Shōgenji narrating its audio guide.

Shōgenji continued her anime-related work by becoming an ambassador for the anime adaptation of Snowball Earth. She, Nao Kosaka, and Kaho Fujishima also became the first Hinatazaka46 members to perform an anime song, as featured artists in "Romantic ga Hoshiinara" by BocchiBoromaru for season two of The Elusive Samurai, first aired in July.

Shōgenji served as title song center for the third time for Hinatazaka46's 18th single, "Ichaicha Mushi", released on September 30. In an interview aired on Hinatazaka de Aimashō after the announcement, she remarked that compared to her previous center appointments, she had "newfound determination" to carry on the group's legacy passed down by her seniors.

== Personal life ==
Shōgenji has introduced several pets on her All Night Nippon X broadcasts. Her family dog is named Muku, after the phrases "pure and innocent" (純粋無垢, junsuimuku) and "to be rewarded" (報われる, mukuwareru). Her black crown-tailed betta is named Nyx, after the Greek goddess of the night, through listeners' suggestions gathered during an October 2026 broadcast.

== Discography ==
The following are Shōgenji's notable participation in Hinatazaka46's discography.

- "Blueberry & Raspberry" (2022, released with "Tsuki to Hoshi ga Odoru Midnight"), debut song
- "Coelacanth" (2023, released on "One Choice"), first time as center
- "Kimi wa Honeydew" (2024), first title song center
- "Zettaiteki Dairokkan" (2024), first ever Hinatazaka46 title song double centers (with Kaho Fujishima)
- "What You Like!" (2025, released with "Love Yourself!"), with Kaho Fujishima and Rina Watanabe as the Suekko Musubi (末っ子むすび; lit. 'Youngest Children Union')
- "Ichaicha Mushi" (2026), title song center

=== Collaboration ===
- "Romantic ga Hoshiinara" (ロマンティックがほしいなら; lit. 'If You're Looking for Romance') by BocchiBoromaru, The Elusive Samurai 2nd ending song (2026), featured artist with Nao Kosaka and Kaho Fujishima

== Filmography ==
=== Film ===
Shōgenji's feature film appearances
Year	Title	Role	Notes	Ref(s)
2024	All of Tokyo! (ゼンブ・オブ・トーキョー, Zenbu obu Tōkyō)	Yurika Ikezono	Lead role	
2027	Leviathan	Satsuki Igarashi		
2027	Zenbu of World (ゼンブ・オブ・ワールド)	Yurika Ikezono	Lead role	

=== Television ===
Shōgenji's television appearances
Year	Title	Role	Notes	Ref(s)
2023−2024	NHK High School Courses − "Informatics I"	Co-host		
2023−present	Hinatazaka Anime Club	Co-host		
2024	Oha Suta	Yōko Shōgenji in the Daimonji and Mondaiji comedy shorts series	Guest star; 4 episodes	

=== Commercials ===
Shōgenji's commercial spot appearances
Year	Title	Notes	Ref(s)
2024	Ice de Breakers	Morinaga Ice Box commercial series	
2025	Sony Assurance	Sony Financial Group	

=== Music videos ===
Shōgenji's appearances in music videos by other artists
Year	Title	Artist	Notes	Ref(s)
2024	"Kyūkōken to Rhythm" (急行券とリズム; lit. 'Express Ticket and Rhythm')	Conton Candy	Lead role; All of Tokyo! theme song	

== Radio ==
- Hinatazaka46 Yōko Shōgenji's All Night Nippon 0 (Zero) (August 17, 2025, Nippon Broadcasting System), special host
- Hinatazaka46 Yōko Shōgenji's All Night Nippon X (Cross) (April 2026–present, Nippon Broadcasting System), weekly host

== Bibliography ==
Shōgenji's released books
Title	Release date	Publisher	ISBN
Triangle Magazine 02 (photo collection)	January 23, 2024	Kodansha	ISBN 978-4065347737

== Other appearances ==
=== Stage play ===
- The Quintessential Quintuplets (2025), as Yotsuba Nakano (triple cast)
