= Kazuyoshi Kumakiri =

Japanese film director (born 1974)

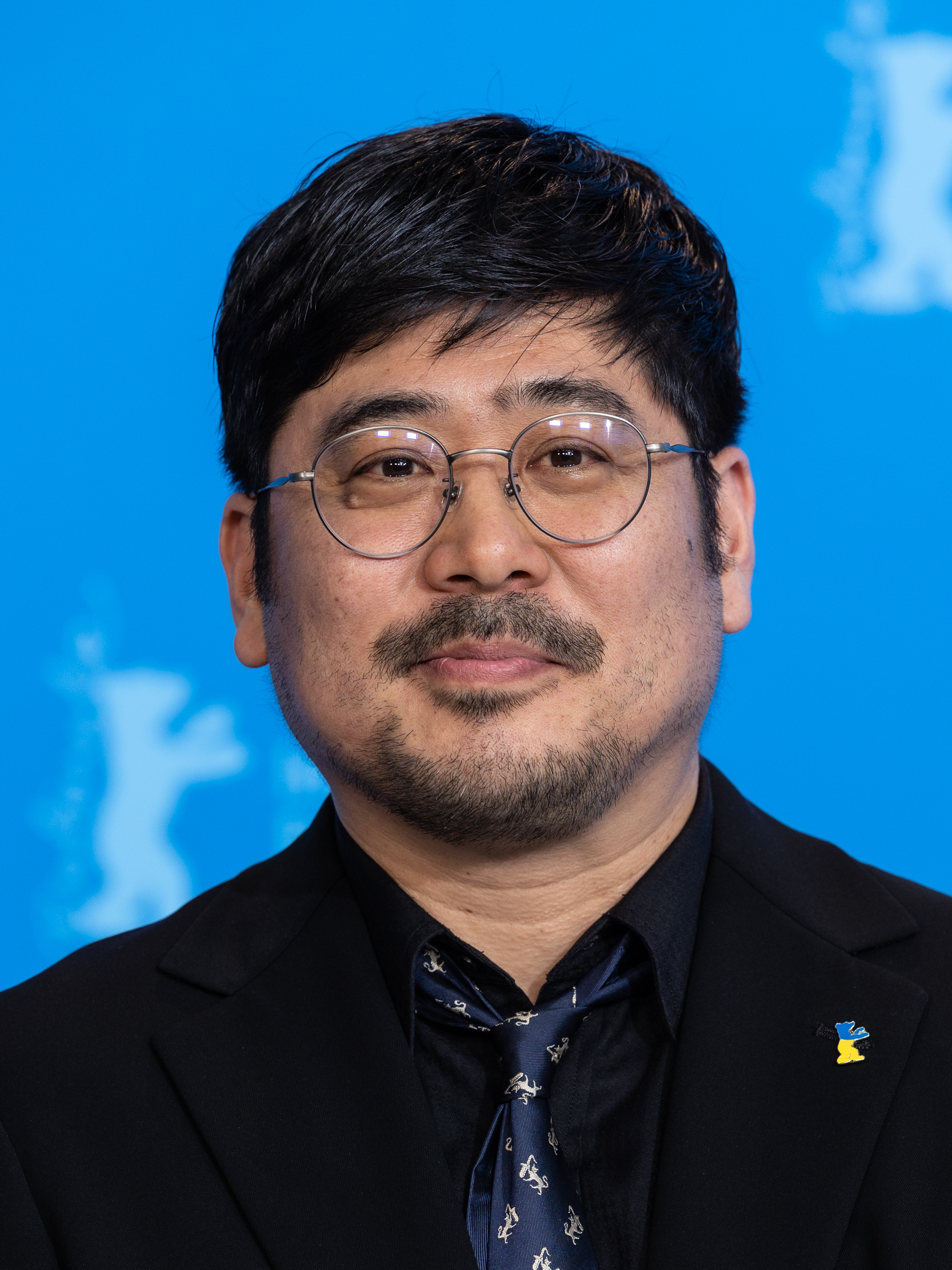
- Kumakiri at Berlinale 2023
- Born: September 1, 1974 (age 52); Obihiro, Hokkaido, Japan
- Education: Osaka University of Arts
- Occupation: Film director

Kazuyoshi Kumakiri (熊切 和嘉, Kumakiri Kazuyoshi; born 1 September 1974) is a Japanese film director.

== Career ==
Kumakiri debuted with Kichiku in 1997. His 2001 film, Hole in the Sky, starred Susumu Terajima and Yuriko Kikuchi. His 2004 film, Green Mind, Metal Bats, screened at the International Film Festival Rotterdam in 2006. He directed Sketches of Kaitan City in 2010. In 2012, he returned with Blazing Famiglia, which starred the comedian Yoshimi Tokui. His 2014 film, My Man, won the “Golden George” prize for the best film at the 36th Moscow International Film Festival. In 2023, his feature film Yoko won the Golden Goblet Award for Best Feature Film, which is the highest prize at the 25th Shanghai International Film Festival.

== Filmography ==
- Kichiku Dai Enkai (1997)
- Hole in the Sky (2001)
- Antena (2004)
- The Ravaged House: Zoroku's Disease (2004)
- Green Mind, Metal Bats (2006)
- Freesia: Icy Tears (2007)
- Nonko (2008)
- Sketches of Kaitan City (2010)
- Blazing Famiglia (2012)
- The End of Summer (2013)
- My Man (2014)
- Mukoku (2017)
- #Manhole (2023)
- Yoko, aka 658km, Yoko no tabi (2023)
- All of Tokyo! (2024)
- The Shrine (2026, South Korean film)
- Zenbu of World (2027, All of Tokyo! sequel)
