= Zettaiteki Dairokkan =

- Type A CD cover, featuring Yōko Shōgenji and Kaho Fujishima

Single by Hinatazaka46
- Released: September 18, 2024
- Genre: J-pop
- Label: Sony
- Lyricist: Yasushi Akimoto
- Producer: Yasushi Akimoto

Hinatazaka46 singles chronology
| "Kimi wa Honeydew" (2024) | "Zettaiteki Dairokkan" (2024) | "Sotsugyō Shashin Dake ga Shitteru" (2025) |

Music video
- "Zettaiteki Dairokkan" on YouTube
- "Kimi o Oboetenai" on YouTube
- "Yūhi Dance" on YouTube

"Zettaiteki Dairokkan" (Japanese: 絶対的第六感; lit. 'Absolute Sixth Sense') is the 12th single by Japanese girl group Hinatazaka46, released on September 18, 2024, by Sony Music Entertainment Japan. It features Yōko Shōgenji and Kaho Fujishima as the first dual lead performers, or "double centers", of a Hinatazaka46 title song. The single debuted atop the weekly Oricon Singles Chart with over 476,000 copies sold.

== Production and release ==
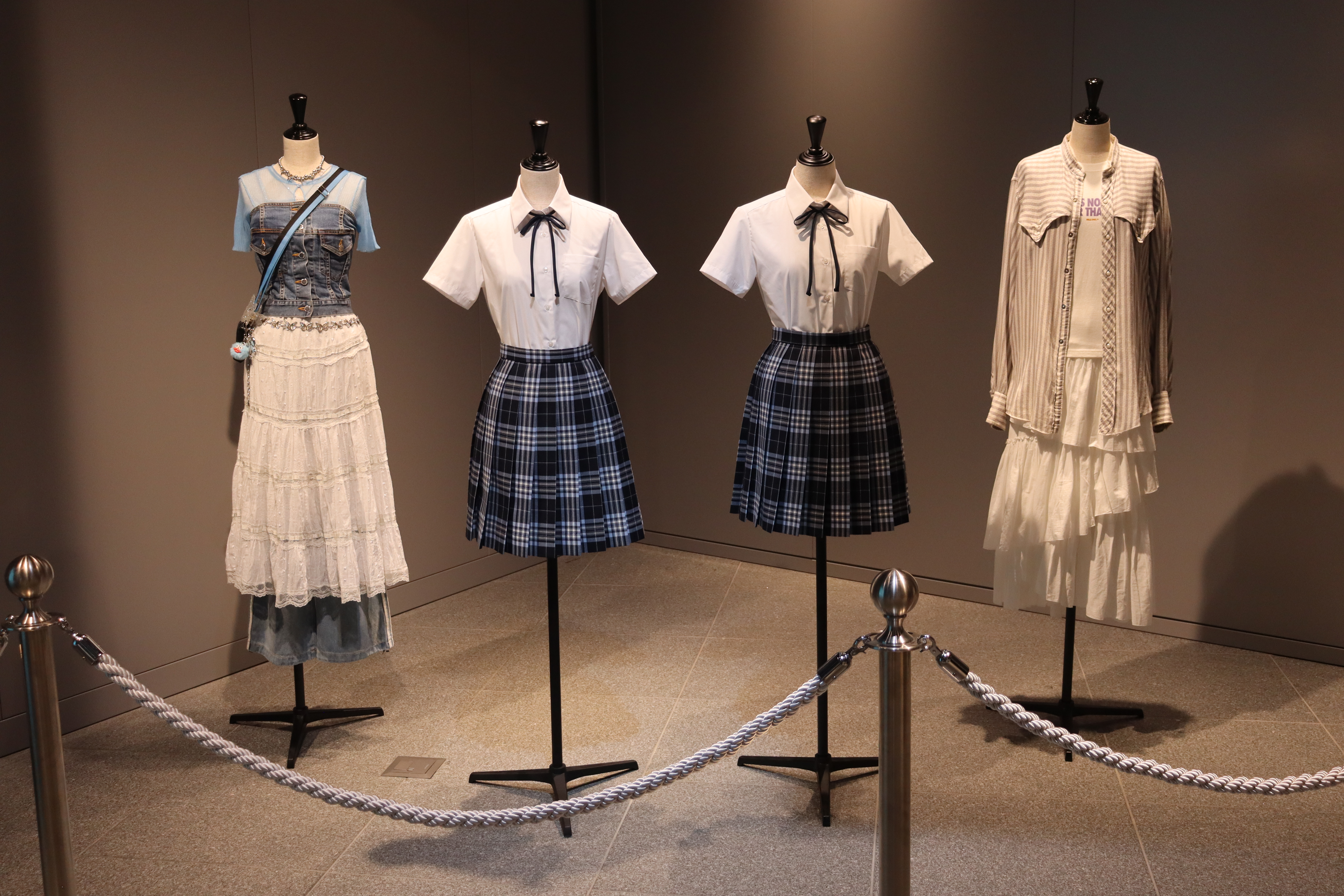
Costumes worn in the "Zettaiteki Dairokkan" music video by the front row members

"Zettaiteki Dairokkan" is the last single to feature Shiho Katō, Mei Higashimura, Akari Nibu, and Hiyori Hamagishi, as they were set to leave Hinatazaka46 after promotions for the single have concluded. Katō performed her third and final solo song as a member, "Docchi ga Saki ni Iu?", while Higashimura and Nibu performed the duet "Mōsō Cosmos".

The single was released on physical media in five editions, consisting of four special editions (Types A to D) and a regular edition.

== Reception ==
The single debuted atop the weekly Oricon Singles Chart with over 476,000 copies sold.

== Track listing ==
1. "Zettaiteki Dairokkan"
2. "Kimi o Oboetenai" (Note: 君を覚えてない; lit. 'I Don't Remember You')
3. Different tracks on each edition:
  - Type-A: "Eien no Sophia" (Note: 永遠のソフィア, Eien no Sofia; lit. 'Eternal Sophia')
  - Type-B: "Docchi ga Saki ni Iu?" (Note: どっちが先に言う？; lit. 'Who Will Say It First?')
  - Type-C: "Mōsō Cosmos" (Note: 妄想コスモス; lit. 'Fantasy Cosmos')
  - Type-D: "Yuki ga Furu, Kokoro no Sekai ni" (Note: 雪は降る 心の世界に; lit. 'Snow Falls in My Mindscape')
  - Regular: "Yūhi Dance" (Note: 夕陽Dance; lit. 'Sunset Dance')
4. "Zettaiteki Dairokkan" (off vocal ver.)
5. "Kimi o Oboetenai" (off vocal ver.)
6. Off-vocal versions of track 3

== Personnel ==
Formations obtained from official website.

=== "Zettaiteki Dairokkan" ===
Centers: Yōko Shōgenji and Kaho Fujishima

- 1st row: Shiho Katō, Yōko Shōgenji, Kaho Fujishima, Nao Kosaka
- 2nd row: Konoka Matsuda, Mei Higashimura, Mirei Sasaki, Akari Nibu, Miku Kanemura
- 3rd row: Suzuka Tomita, Hinano Kamimura, Hina Kawata, Mikuni Takahashi, Nanami Konishi

=== "Kimi o Oboetenai" ===
Center: Sumire Miyachi

- 1st row: Marie Morimoto, Sumire Miyachi, Hiyori Hamagishi
- 2nd row: Honoka Hirao, Haruyo Yamaguchi, Rina Watanabe, Haruka Yamashita
- 3rd row: Mitsuki Hiraoka, Mana Takase, Tamaki Ishizuka, Kirari Takeuchi

=== "Eien no Sophia" ===
Same as "Zettaiteki Dairokkan"

=== "Docchi ga Saki ni Iu?" ===
Shiho Katō

=== "Mōsō Cosmos" ===
Mei Higashimura, Akari Nibu

=== "Yuki ga Furu, Kokoro no Sekai ni" ===
Same as "Kimi o Oboetenai"

=== "Yūhi Dance" ===
Center: Rina Watanabe

- 1st row: Rio Shimizu, Rina Watanabe, Honoka Hirao
- 2nd row: Sumire Miyachi, Tamaki Ishizuka, Kirari Takeuchi, Mitsuki Hiraoka
- 3rd row: Yōko Shōgenji, Nanami Konishi, Haruka Yamashita, Kaho Fujishima

== Charts ==
=== Weekly charts ===
Weekly chart performance for "Zettaiteki Dairokkan"
| Chart (2024) | Peak position |
|---|---|
| Japan (Japan Hot 100) | 1 |
| Japan (Oricon) | 1 |
| Japan Combined Singles (Oricon) | 1 |
| Japanese Digital Albums (Oricon) | 1 |

=== Monthly charts ===
Monthly chart performance for "Zettaiteki Dairokkan"
| Chart (2024) | Position |
|---|---|
| Japan (Oricon) | 1 |

=== Year-end charts ===
Year-end chart performance for "Zettaiteki Dairokkan"
| Chart (2024) | Position |
|---|---|
| Japan Top Singles Sales (Billboard Japan) | 17 |
| Japan (Oricon) | 14 |

== Certifications ==
Certifications for "Zettaiteki Dairokkan"
| Region | Certification | Certified units/sales |
|---|---|---|
| Japan (RIAJ) | 2× Platinum | 500,000^{^} |
^{^} Shipments figures based on certification alone.
