= Inagakuen Public High School =

Coordinates: 36°00′49″N 139°36′46″E

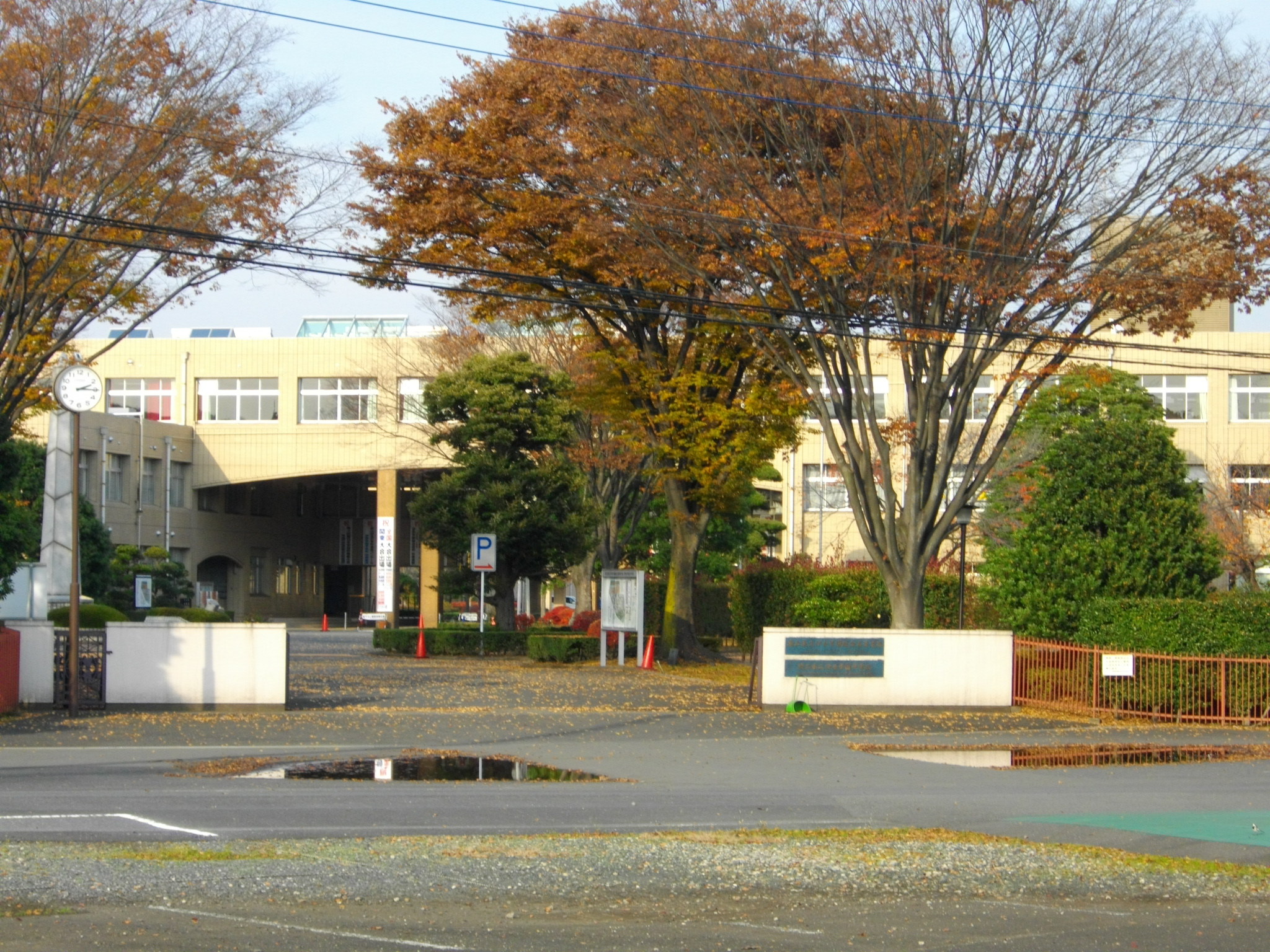

Information
- Established: 1994; 32 years ago
- Website: inagakuen.spec.ed.jp

Inagakuen is a coeducational junior and senior high school in Saitama prefecture, Japan. It was established in 1984 and is one of Japan's largest public schools. It has the status of SELHi, Super English Language High school.

The founding day (which is a school holiday) is June 8.

Although Japanese law prohibits the hiring of non-Japanese-citizens as teachers, there are 6 full-time and 3 part-time native speakers of foreign languages: French, German, English and Chinese.

== Features ==
The school is divided into 6 houses, owing to the large size (around 2700 students with over 250 teachers). Each house is a separate building, and these are connected by a 2nd-floor corridor. The campus is over 3 times as large as the Tokyo Dome, at 155,000 square meters, and features 3 gymnasiums, an outdoor swimming pool, a running track, baseball and tennis courts as well as soccer pitches. There are over 50 extracurricular clubs for students to participate in. In 2006 air-conditioning was installed in all classrooms, and most staffrooms.

== House system ==
Because of Inagakuen's size, it is split into 6 houses, of roughly equal size. Each house has a principal, who acts as a vice principal of the school as a whole. So the school has one principal and 6 vice-principals. Students wear a school uniform with the school logo on their shirt which is coloured according to which house they are in.

1st house: Since 2003/2004 academic year, this house has been entirely a junior high house, with no senior high students. The house colour is red.

2nd house: A senior high only house, specialising in foreign languages. House colour is yellow

3rd house: A senior high only house, specialising in social studies (humanities). House colour is white, or orange if on a white background.

4th house: A senior high house, specialising in mathematics. House colour is green.

5th house: A senior high house, specialising in sciences. House colour is light blue.

6th house: A senior high house, specialising in sciences. House colour is dark blue.

Students belong to the same house throughout their study in Inagakuen, and have a home-room in their house. Owing to the size of the school, and the elective nature of some of the studies, it is not possible for students to receive all of their lessons in their own home-room (as is normal in Japanese schools). There is a 10-minute break between each class to allow students to move to their next classroom.

== Clubs and activities ==
There are approximately 50 very active extra-curriclaur clubs, including all the usual sports and hobbies, and some less common, such as lacrosse and broadcasting.

Notable club successes:

- English Debate
  - 2007 nationwide high school comprehensive conference, third in the nation
  - 2008 nationwide high school comprehensive conference, second in the nation
- Boys volleyball section
  - 2006 nationwide high school comprehensive physical education conference
  - 37th nationwide high school volleyball selection victory conference participation (2nd place)
- Wind band
  - In the 27th Vienna international young people's music festival invitational, grand prix winners
  - In the 15th Pacific music festival, grand prix winners.
- Archery section
  - Women's 2006 nationwide high school comprehensive physical education conference, competitors.

== Cultural festival ==
Every year, over a weekend at the beginning of September the school hosts a culture festival, which is very popular with local Japanese people (usually over 15000 attendees). The houses compete for a prize awarded to the house which best decorates their building according to a certain theme. There is live music, and demonstrations from some of the clubs and societies.

In 2006 the festival was held on 9th and 10 September, and will hopefully be larger than any previous year.

== Sources ==
Most of this article has come from translating the Japanese Wikipedia page of the same subject, here. Some from the schools official homepage, and some from personal experience of the school.
