= Conton Candy =

Japanese rock band

- Origin: Tokyo, Japan
- Genre: Rock
- Years active: 2018–present
- Label: Sony
- Members: Tsumugi (vocal, guitar); Fuka (bass); Sayaka (drums)
- Website: Official website

Conton Candy is a three-piece Japanese rock band formed in 2018 by members of a high school light music club. The band came into prominence with their 2023 song "Fuzzy Navel", which became a viral hit on social media and reached #17 on the Billboard Japan Hot 100 chart. They have since provided original songs for film and anime series, including "Kyūkōken to Rhythm" for All of Tokyo! (2024), "Snowdrop" for Rascal Does Not Dream of Santa Claus (2025), and "Futsū" for Sakamoto Days (2025).
