= Kaho Fujishima =

Japanese singer and media personality

- 藤嶌果歩
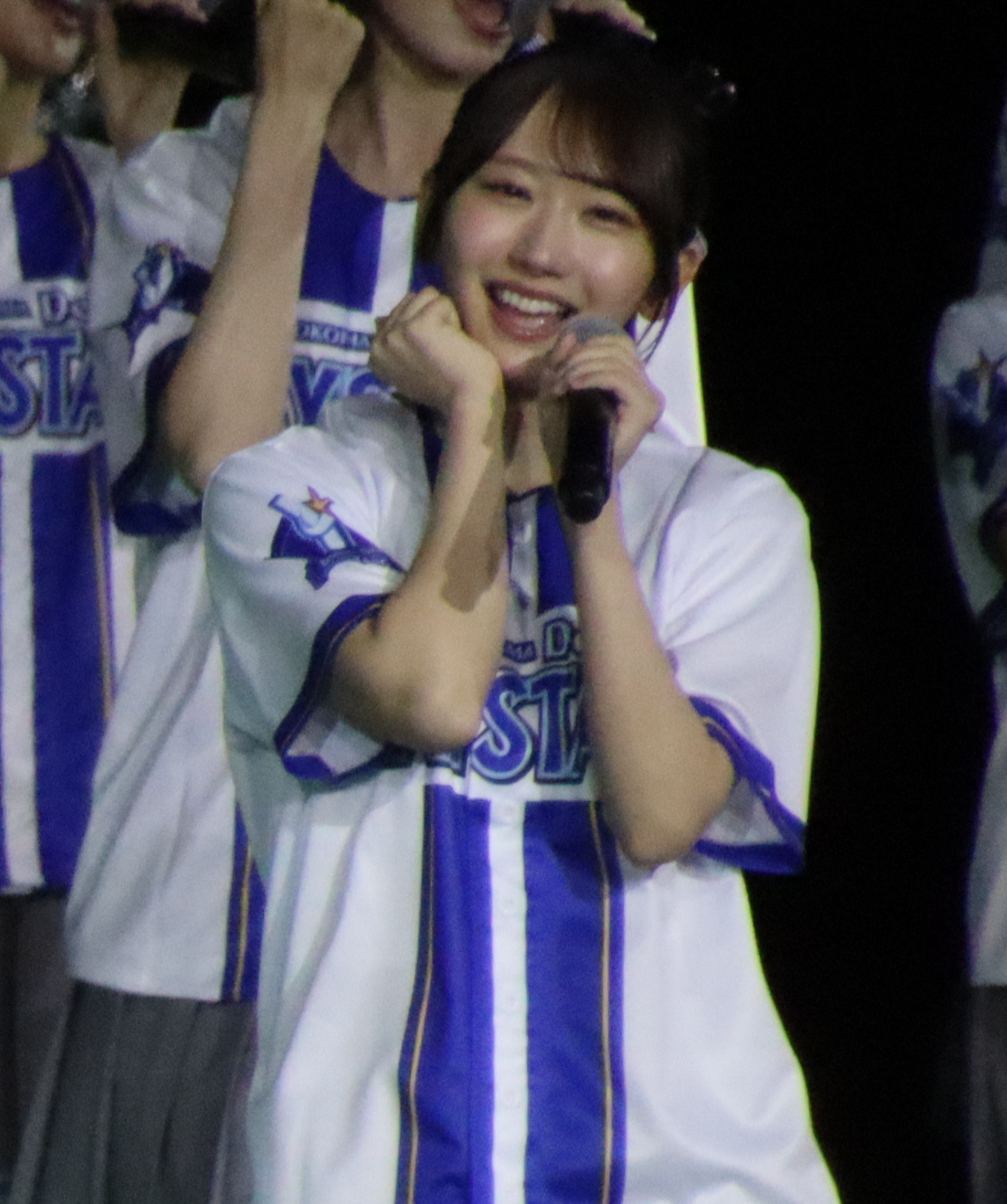
- Fujishima in 2026
- Born: August 7, 2006 (age 20); Sapporo, Hokkaido, Japan
- Occupations: singer; media personality
- Years active: 2022–present
- Height: 160 cm (5 ft 3 in)
- Musical career
- Genre: J-pop
- Label: Sony Music Entertainment Japan
- Member of: Hinatazaka46
- Website: Official website

Kaho Fujishima (Japanese: 藤嶌 果歩, Hepburn: Fujishima Kaho; born August 7, 2006) is a Japanese singer and media personality. She is a member of the Japanese girl group Hinatazaka46.

Fujishima joined Hinatazaka46 in 2022 and has served as lead performer for the singles "Zettaiteki Dairokkan" (2024) and "Kind of Love" (2026). She made her live-action film debut in All of Tokyo! (2024) and her voice acting debut in That Time I Got Reincarnated as a Slime the Movie: Tears of the Azure Sea (2026). She also released her first photobook in 2026.

== Early life ==
Fujishima hails from Sapporo, Hokkaido, and is the youngest of four siblings. She described her family as "full of Sakamichi Series fans". She has 11 years of experience in Japanese calligraphy and obtained the rank of senshō (選奨; lit. 'special selection') in middle school, where she served as calligraphy club captain. She also studied the Analects, an ancient Chinese philosophical text, at a specialized school for children.

== Career ==
Fujishima passed the Hinatazaka46 New Member Audition and joined as part of the group's fourth generation. Her profile was unveiled to the public on September 29, 2022. She made her music debut with the track "Blueberry & Raspberry," the fourth generation song included on the group's 8th single, "Tsuki to Hoshi ga Odoru Midnight" (2022).

Fujishima became center (lead performer) for the fourth generation song "Mita Koto Nai Mamono," which was featured as a B-side on the group's 10th single, "Am I Ready?" (2023). She personally wrote the calligraphy of "Sense of Unity" (一体感, ittaikan) printed on the T-shirts for the fourth generation's Shinzanmono concert in December 2023. She went on to serve as a co-center for Hinatazaka46's 12th single "Zettaiteki Dairokkan" (2024) alongside fellow fourth generation member Yōko Shōgenji; this release marked the first time the group featured dual centers for a title song. Fujishima became a solo title song center for the 17th single, "Kind of Love" (2026), which was announced and first performed on April 5, 2026, during the encore of the Hinatansai anniversary concert at the Yokohama Stadium.

Fujishima and Shōgenji, fourth generation members of the same age, have been described as two of the group's emerging "leading figures" and are frequently paired together as the duo "Shogekaho". They co-starred in the 2024 web commercial series Ice de Breakers for Morinaga & Company's Ice Box brand. The same year, Fujishima also became a brand ambassador for Coach & Four (コーチャンフォー), a bookstore chain based in Hokkaido, her home prefecture. (Note: Coach & Four requires its brand ambassadors to be Hokkaido natives who have been regular customers of the chain.) Fujishima and Shōgenji appeared together again in a 7-part commercial series for Sony Assurance (ソニー損保, Sony Sonpo) in 2025, where they portrayed sisters alongside series regular and fellow Hinatazaka46 member Nao Kosaka.

Fujishima made her film debut in All of Tokyo! (2024), an ensemble coming-of-age drama starring the 11 fourth generation members of Hinatazaka46 as high school students on a trip to Tokyo. She made her voice acting debut in the anime film That Time I Got Reincarnated as a Slime the Movie: Tears of the Azure Sea (2026), alongside Nao Kosaka. In interviews, she remarked that she lowered her vocal register to fit the character's "serious" core and differentiate the character from her usual image as an idol. She, Kosaka, and Shōgenji also became the first Hinatazaka46 members to perform an anime song, as featured artists in "Romantic ga Hoshiinara" by BocchiBoromaru for season two of The Elusive Samurai, first aired in July.

Fujishima's photobook, titled Kajitsu no Hohaba (果実の歩幅; lit. 'Fruitful Strides' and containing both kanji characters from her given name) and published by Shueisha, was released on August 4, 2026, three days before her twentieth birthday. The photography took place in Hokkaido and Miami, Florida, United States. She commented that she had wanted to be photographed in a "colorful" city and that the book would serve as a "lucky charm" for her. The book placed first on the Oricon Weekly Photobook Ranking for two weeks in a row, with around 66 thousand copies sold.

== Discography ==
The following are Fujishima's notable contributions in Hinatazaka46's discography.

- "Blueberry & Raspberry" (2022, released with "Tsuki to Hoshi ga Odoru Midnight"), debut song
- "Mita Koto Nai Mamono" (見たことない魔物; lit. 'Monster Never Seen Before') (2023, released with "Am I Ready?"), center (lead performer)
- "Zettaiteki Dairokkan" (絶対的第六感; lit. 'Absolute Sixth Sense') (2024), title song co-center with Yōko Shōgenji
- "What You Like!" (2025, released with "Love Yourself!"), with Yōko Shōgenji and Rina Watanabe as the Suekko Musubi (末っ子むすび; lit. 'Youngest Children Union')
- "Kind of Love" (2026), title song center

=== Collaboration ===
- "Romantic ga Hoshiinara" (ロマンティックがほしいなら; lit. 'If You're Looking for Romance') by BocchiBoromaru, The Elusive Samurai 2nd ending song (2026), featured artist with Nao Kosaka and Yōko Shōgenji

== Filmography ==
=== Film ===
Fujishima's feature film appearances
Year	Title	Role	Notes	Ref(s)
2024	All of Tokyo! (ゼンブ・オブ・トーキョー, Zenbu of Tokyo)	Megu Hagawa		
2026	That Time I Got Reincarnated as a Slime the Movie: Tears of the Azure Sea	Yori		
2027	Zenbu of World (ゼンブ・オブ・ワールド)	Megu Hagawa		

=== Television ===
Fujishima's television show appearances
Year	Title	Role	Notes	Ref(s)
2025	Oha Suta	Kaho Fujishima in the Daimonji and Mondaiji comedy shorts	Guest star; 4 episodes	
2025	Hinatazaka46's Kaho Fujishima's Hokkaido-nuts!	Co-host	Television special	

=== Commercials ===
Fujishima's commercial appearances
Year	Title	Notes	Ref(s)
2024	Ice de Breakers	Morinaga Ice Box commercial series (5 parts)	
2024–present	Coach & Four	Brand ambassador	
2025–present	Sony Assurance	Sony Financial Group; appeared in the "Sony Assurance Three Sisters" series	

== Bibliography ==
- Kajitsu no Hohaba (果実の歩幅; lit. 'Fruitful Strides') (2026), photobook, published by Shueisha, ISBN 4087902234

== Other appearances ==
=== Radio ===
- Lawson presents Hinatazaka46's Hotto Hitoiki! (Note: ローソン presents 日向坂46のほっとひといき!) (2025–present, Tokyo FM), host (rotating with other Hinatazaka46 members)

=== Stage play ===
- The Quintessential Quintuplets (2025), as Yotsuba Nakano (triple cast)
