= Miku Kanemura =

Japanese singer and model (born 2002)

- 金村 美玖
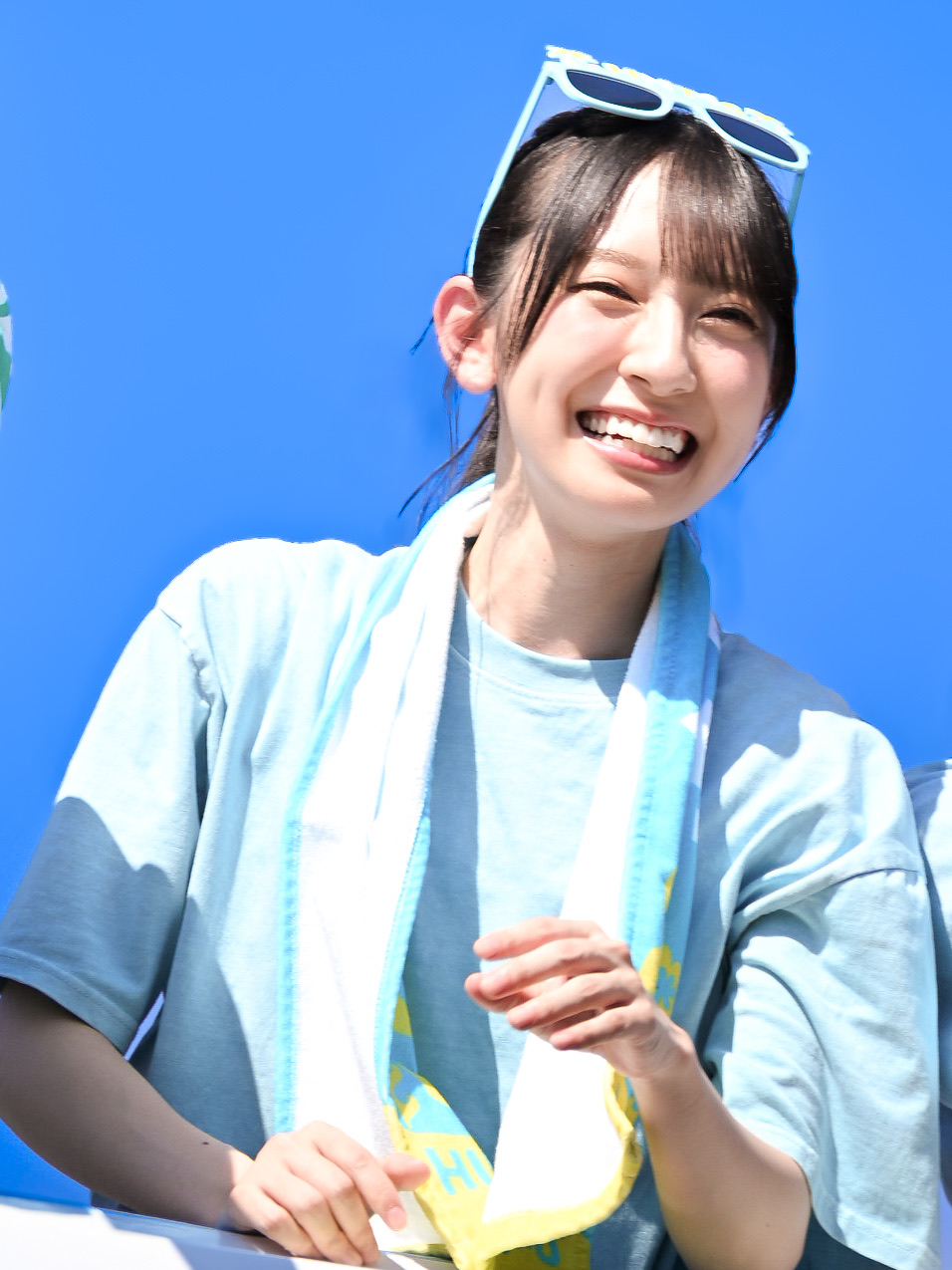
- Kanemura in September 2024
- Born: September 10, 2002 (age 24); Saitama Prefecture, Japan
- Education: College of Art, Nihon University
- Occupations: Singer; model
- Years active: 2017–present
- Modeling information
- Height: 162.7 cm (5 ft 4 in)
- Hair color: Black
- Eye color: Black
- Musical career
- Years active: 2017–present
- Label: Sony Music Records
- Member of: Hinatazaka46
- Website: Official website

Miku Kanemura (Japanese: 金村 美玖, Hepburn: Kanemura Miku; born September 10, 2002) is a Japanese singer and model. She is a member of the girl group Hinatazaka46 and a regular model for the fashion magazines Bis and Voce.

Kanemura has been the lead performer for the Hinatazaka46 singles "Tteka" (2021) and "Onegai Bach!" (2025). She became a regular model for Bis in 2020 and Voce in 2026, and has walked the runways of the Tokyo Girls Collection and GirlsAward fashion shows.

Kanemura is a graduate of the College of Art, Nihon University. She has held several solo photography exhibitions and currently writes for the professional photography magazine Commercial Photo.

== Career ==
=== 2017−2019: Early career ===
On August 13, 2017, Kanemura passed the auditions for new members of Keyakizaka46's subgroup Hiragana Keyakizaka46, now Hinatazaka46, and became one of the second generation members of the group. As a sushi lover, she goes by the nickname "Osushi" and her catchphrase, "Everybody has to support Miku" (皆さん美玖をおすしかない, minasan Miku o osushikanai), contains a pun of "to support" (推す, osu) and "sushi" (お寿司, osushi). Aside from singing, Kanemura also plays the saxophone and drums and has played both on Hinatazaka46's television shows.

=== 2020−2023: Modeling debut, first title song center ===
On October 1, 2020, Kanemura became a regular model for the Japanese fashion magazine Bis. She has since walked the runways of Tokyo Girls Collection (2021 Autumn/Winter, 2022 Spring/Summer) and GirlsAward (2022 Spring/Summer). Her first photobook, titled Rashinban (羅針盤; lit. 'Compass'), was released on December 20, 2022, published by Kobunsha (the publisher of Bis). The photography took place from autumn 2021 to summer 2022 in the prefectures of Hokkaido, Kyoto, Wakayama, and Kagoshima. The book sold 73,000 copies in its first week and placed first on the Oricon Weekly Book Ranking.

In 2021, Kanemura became the title song center (lead performer) for Hinatazaka46's sixth single "Tteka". She also portrayed the main character in the music video of "Natsuarashi" (夏嵐) by the band Genie High, released in August. The band's drummer, comedian Kazutoyo Koyabu, was the host of Hinatazaka46's television show Hinabingo!

=== 2024−present: Expanding into photography ===
Kanemura, along with Nao Kosaka and Yōko Shōgenji, was a subject for the Triangle Magazine 02 photo collection, or "visual magazine", published by Kodansha on January 23, 2024. Among the three models, she represented the theme of "daydream", described as showcasing her "ethereal beauty". It placed first on both the Oricon Book and Photobook weekly rankings of its release week with 61,000 copies sold.

Photography work
- Kanemura serving as concert photographer for the Hinatazaka46 5th Generation Shinzanmono concert, December 2025 on YouTube

Kanemura studied photography at the College of Art, Nihon University, and graduated in March 2025. In 2024, she held her first solo photo exhibition as a photography student, titled Mitomeru (みとめる; lit. 'Acknowledge'), at the New Gallery in Tokyo from September 10 to October 6. Also in September, she started her own series in the professional photography magazine Commercial Photo (Genkosha), in which she took on various assignments in order to broaden her portfolio, including serving as a Hinatazaka46 concert photographer. She held her first public mini-seminar in February 2026 as part of the CP+ 2026 photography exhibition at Pacifico Yokohama, discussing her ongoing work with the magazine. Her cameras have included a Nikon D5300, Sony α7 III, Contax Aria, Pentax 17, Olympus PEN E-PL9, and Leica Q3.

Kanemura became title song center for the second time with for Hinatazaka46's 2025 15th single "Onegai Bach!", sharing the role with fellow second generation member Nao Kosaka. Later that year, she played the drums live on stage in the Tokyo leg of the "Monster Groove" tour at the Yoyogi National Gymnasium.

Bis magazine ceased regular publication in 2026; Kanemura and fellow regular models Ayame Tsutsui and Yūki Yoda, all of whom were current or former Sakamichi Series members, graced the cover of its Winter 2026 issue, released in December 2025 as the final regular issue. In February 2026, she was announced as a regular model for Voce magazine, published by Kodansha, with her debut appearance in its April issue released that month.

Kanemura held a photo exhibition titled Kioku no Kakera (記憶の欠片; lit. 'Fragments of Memory') on April 3–5, 2026, at the Rinko Park in Yokohama, in collaboration with the Central Music & Entertainment Festival 2026. It coincided with Hinatazaka46's 7th Hinatansai anniversary concert at the nearby Yokohama Stadium.

Kanemura's second photobook, Kibi (機微; lit. 'Subtleties'), photographed in Austria and published by Kodansha, was released on October 20. Both the location and theme, "limited-time romance", were inspired by the 1995 romantic film Before Sunrise. The book sold 34,000 copies in its release week and placed first on the Oricon Weekly Book Ranking.

== Personal life ==
Kanemura's granduncle, chocolatier Masakazu Kobayashi, is the inventor of ganache-based delicacy nama chocolate (生チョコレート; lit. 'raw chocolate') and co-creator of the similar Meiji Meltykiss chocolate.

== Discography ==
Kanemura has been in the original lineups of all Hinatazaka46 title songs and was the center (lead performer) for the title songs "Tteka" (2021) and co-center for "Onegai Bach!" (2025). Other prominent appearances include:

- "Dash & Rush" ("Do Re Mi Sol La Si Do" B-side, 2019), center
- "Cage" ("Do Re Mi Sol La Si Do" B-side, 2019), with Mei Higashimura, Hina Kawata, and Akari Nibu (Yancharu Family)
- "See Through" (Hinatazaka, 2020), duet with Nao Kosaka (NaoMiku)
- "Akubi Letter" ("Tteka" B-side, 2021), center, with Color Chart
- "Mou Konna ni Suki ni Narenai" ("Boku Nanka" B-side, 2022), performed by all members born in 2002 (Kanemura, Nao Kosaka, and Hiyori Hamagishi)
- "Sonota Ōzei Type" ("Tsuki to Hoshi ga Odoru Midnight" B-side, 2022), with Yūka Kageyama, Suzuka Tomita, and Hinano Kamimura

== Filmography ==
=== Television ===
Year	Title	Role	Notes	Ref(s)
2017	Re:Mind	Miku Kanemura		
2020	Dasada	Satsuki Furuoka		
2021	Koeharu!	Yukina Tsukikawa		
2021	Pickles the Frog: Color of Feelings	Miku (voice)		
2022	Run for the Money	Contestant (as herself)		

=== Web series ===
Web series
- If I Weren't an Idol on TikTok

Year	Title	Role	Ref(s)
2026	If I Weren't an Idol (もしも私がアイドルじゃなかったら)	Miku Kanemura	

=== Music video ===
Music video
- "Natsuarashi" on YouTube

Year	Artist	Title	Notes	Ref(s)
2021	Genie High	"Natsuarashi"	Lead role	

== Photo exhibitions ==
- Mitomeru (みとめる; lit. 'Acknowledge'), New Gallery, Tokyo, September 10−October 6, 2024
- Kioku no Kakera (記憶の欠片; lit. 'Fragments of Memory'), Rinko Park, Yokohama, April 3–5, 2026

== Other appearances ==
=== Radio ===
Year	Title	Role	Network	Notes	Ref(s)
2020–2024	Belc presents Hinatazaka46 no Yokei na Kotomade Yarimashō (ベルク presents 日向坂46の余計な事までやりましょう, transl. Let's Do Extra Things)	Host	Tokyo FM		

=== Theater ===
Year	Title	Role(s)	Venue(s)	Ref(s)
2018	Ayumi	Multiple	AiiA 2.5 Theater Tokyo	
2018	Magia Record	Sayaka Miki	Akasaka ACT Theater	

== Bibliography ==
Title	Release date	Publisher	ISBN
Rashinban (羅針盤; lit. 'Compass', photobook)	December 20, 2022	Kobunsha	978-4334903053
Triangle Magazine 02 (photo collection)	January 23, 2024	Kodansha	978-4065347720
Create My Book, column in Commercial Photo magazine	2024–present	Genkosha	
Kibi (機微; lit. 'Subtleties', photobook)	October 20, 2026	Kodansha	978-4065459966
