= Hinatazaka46 3rd Anniversary Memorial Live in Tokyo Dome =

- Limited edition DVD cover

Live album by Hinatazaka46
- Released: July 20, 2022
- Recorded: March 30–31, 2022; Tokyo Dome
- Genre: J-pop
- Length: Regular (Day 1): 173:00; Regular (Day 2): 180:00; Complete: 396:00
- Label: Sony Music Entertainment Japan
- Producer: Yasushi Akimoto
- Related videos "Hinatazaka46 3rd Anniversary Memorial Live in Tokyo Dome" Digest picture on YouTube "Hinatazaka46 3rd Anniversary Memorial Live in Tokyo Dome" bonus video trailer on YouTube "Hinatazaka46 3rd Anniversary Memorial Live in Tokyo Dome" CM (Joyful Love edition) on YouTube "Hinatazaka46 3rd Anniversary Memorial Live in Tokyo Dome" CM (Yakusoku no Tamago edition) on YouTube

Hinatazaka46 3rd Anniversary Memorial Live in Tokyo Dome (Japanese: 日向坂46 3周年記念MEMORIAL LIVE ～3回目のひな誕祭～ in 東京ドーム) is a live video album by the Japanese idol girl group Hinatazaka46, which documents the group's first concert at the Tokyo Dome on March 30–31, 2022. It was released on July 20, 2022 and is the first live video album released by the group.

== Background ==
Hinatazaka46 was originally scheduled to hold their first Tokyo Dome concert in December 2020 for their annual Hinakuri (ひなくり; short for "Hinatazaka Christmas") concert, but the concert was postponed due to the COVID-19 pandemic in Japan and finally held on March 30–31, 2022 to coincide with their third debut anniversary. Nao Kosaka, who had been on hiatus due to poor health since June 2021, made her return at the concert. Both days of the concert were available on paid livestream worldwide.

On March 26, 2022, member Hiyori Hamagishi announced that she tested positive for COVID-19 and would be absent from the concert. She still appeared on the opening video and the narration video on the final part.

On the second day, the group announced the release of their seventh single "Boku Nanka" during the encore, followed by the first live performance of the title song.

== Production and release ==
The video album was released in three editions, each available in Blu-ray and DVD formats. The first press limited edition included both days of the concert and an additional bonus video, while the regular editions feature only either of the two days.

== Commercial performance ==
Hinatazaka46 3rd Anniversary Memorial Live in Tokyo Dome placed first on both the Oricon DVD and Blu-ray Charts, as well as the Music DVD and Blu-ray Chart, selling 42,000 copies in its first week.

== Track listing ==
The encores were split to a second disc in the DVD versions and kept on one disc in the Blu-ray versions.

=== Day 1 ===
==== DVD: Disc 1 ====
Day 1
No.	Title	Length
1.	"VTR-Road to Tokyo Dome-"
2.	"Overture"
3.	"Hiragana Keyaki" (ひらがなけやき)
4.	"Kyun" (キュン)
5.	"Seishun no Uma" (青春の馬)
6.	"Additional Time" (アディショナルタイム)
7.	"My Fans"
8.	"Bokutachi wa Tsukiatteiru" (僕たちは付き合っている)
9.	"Honto no Jikan" (ホントの時間)
10.	"Hiragana de Koishitai" (ひらがなで恋したい)
11.	"Do Re Mi Sol La Si Do" (ドレミソラシド)
12.	"Konna ni Suki ni Natchatte Ii no?" (こんなに好きになっちゃっていいの?)
13.	"Ima ni Mite Iro" (イマニミテイロ)
14.	"Saizenretsu e" (最前列へ)
15.	"Kimi ni Hanashite Okitai Koto" (君に話しておきたいこと)
16.	"Tokimeki Sō" (ときめき草)
17.	"Dance Track"
18.	"Azato Kawaii" (アザトカワイイ)
19.	"Sonna Koto Nai yo" (ソンナコトナイヨ)
20.	"Kitaishiteinai Jibun" (期待していない自分)
21.	"Kimi Shika Katan" (君しか勝たん)
22.	"Eien no Hakusen" (永遠の白線)
23.	"Dance Track"
24.	"Hanbun no Kioku" (半分の記憶)
25.	"Dance Track"
26.	"Tteka" (ってか)
27.	"NO WAR in the future 2020"
28.	"Dare yori mo Takaku Tobe! 2020" (誰よりも高く跳べ! 2020)
29.	"VTR"
30.	"Joyful Love"
Total length:		150:44

==== DVD: Disc 2 (Encore) ====
Day 1
No.	Title	Length
1.	"Yakusoku no Tamago 2020" (約束の卵 2020)
2.	"Hinatazaka" (日向坂)
Total length:		23:20

=== Day 2 ===
==== DVD: Disc 1 ====
Day 2
No.	Title	Length
1.	"VTR-Road to Tokyo Dome-"
2.	"Overture"
3.	"Kyun" (キュン)
4.	"Do Re Mi Sol La Si Do" (ドレミソラシド)
5.	"Oide Natsu no Kyōkaisen" (おいで夏の境界線)
6.	"Kitsune" (キツネ)
7.	"Happy Aura" (ハッピーオーラ)
8.	"Mado o Akenakute mo" (窓を開けなくても)
9.	"Konna ni Suki ni Natchatte Ii no?" (こんなに好きになっちゃっていいの?)
10.	"Dakishimete Yaru" (抱きしめてやる)
11.	"Konna Seiretsu o Dare ga Saseru noka?" (こんな整列を誰がさせるのか?)
12.	"My god"
13.	"Dash&Rush"
14.	"Mijyuku na Ikari" (未熟な怒り)
15.	"Kono Natsu o Jam ni Shiyō" (この夏をジャムにしよう)
16.	"Right?"
17.	"Soredemo Aruiteru" (それでも歩いてる)
18.	"Dance Track"
19.	"Azato Kawaii" (アザトカワイイ)
20.	"Sonna Koto Nai yo" (ソンナコトナイヨ)
21.	"Kitaishiteinai Jibun" (期待していない自分)
22.	"Kimi Shika Katan" (君しか勝たん)
23.	"Eien no Hakusen" (永遠の白線)
24.	"Dance Track"
25.	"Hanbun no Kioku" (半分の記憶)
26.	"Dance Track"
27.	"Tteka" (ってか)
28.	"NO WAR in the future 2020"
29.	"Dare yori mo Takaku Tobe! 2020" (誰よりも高く跳べ! 2020)
30.	"VTR"
31.	"Joyful Love"
Total length:		149:35

==== DVD: Disc 2 (Encore) ====
Day 2
No.	Title	Length
1.	"Boku Nanka" (僕なんか)
2.	"Hinatazaka" (日向坂)
3.	"Yakusoku no Tamago 2020" (約束の卵 2020)
Total length:		30:40

=== First press limited edition ===
DVD and Blu-ray
No.	Title	Length
1.	"Behind the scenes of 3rd Anniversary Memorial in Tokyo Dome" (Behind the scenes of 3回目のひな誕祭 in Tokyo Dome)
Total length:		43:56

== Charts and sales ==
=== Weekly charts ===
Chart (2022)	Format	Peak position	First week sales
Japan (Oricon)	DVD	1	8,000
Japan (Oricon)	Blu-ray	1	34,000
