= Myakuutsu Kanjō =

- Type A cover, featuring Mirei Sasaki, Nao Kosaka, Kumi Sasaki, Hinano Kamimura, and Miku Kanemura

Studio album by Hinatazaka46
- Released: November 8, 2023
- Recorded: 2021–2023
- Genre: J-pop
- Label: Sony Music Entertainment Japan
- Producer: Yasushi Akimoto

Hinatazaka46 chronology
Hinatazaka (2020)	Myakuutsu Kanjō (2023)

Singles from Myakuutsu Kanjō
- 1. "Kimi Shika Katan" Released: May 26, 2021; 2. "Tteka" Released: October 27, 2021; 3. "Boku Nanka" Released: June 1, 2022; 4. "Tsuki to Hoshi ga Odoru Midnight" Released: October 26, 2022; 5. "One Choice" Released: April 19, 2023; 6. "Am I Ready?" Released: July 26, 2023

Music video
- "Kimi wa Zero kara Ichi ni Nare" on YouTube

Myakuutsu Kanjō (脈打つ感情; lit. 'Pulsating Emotions') is the second studio album by Japanese girl group Hinatazaka46. It was released on November 8, 2023, by Sony Music Entertainment Japan. The album features the lead song "Kimi wa Zero kara Ichi ni Nare", with group captain Kumi Sasaki serving as the center (lead performer). The album debuted atop both the weekly Oricon Albums Chart and Billboard Japan Hot Albums chart.

== Production and release ==
Myaku'utsu Kanjō is the first studio album release for Hinatazaka46 in three years since Hinatazaka (2020). The album's concept is centered around a "live performance," with each of the three physical editions organized to mimic a concert setlist. It compiles singles released from 2021 to 2023, alongside five new tracks and live recordings from the group's "Happy Train Tour 2023".

The lead track, "Kimi wa Zero kara Ichi ni Nare", marks the first time group captain Kumi Sasaki has held the center (lead performer) position for a title or lead song. The music video was filmed in Ibaraki Prefecture and choreographed by CRE8BOY.

== Track listing ==
All lyrics written by Yasushi Akimoto.

=== Type A ===
No.	Title	Length
1.	"Kimi Shika Katan"
2.	"Kimi wa Zero kara Ichi ni Nare"
3.	"Tsuki to Hoshi ga Odoru Midnight"
4.	"Blueberry & Raspberry"
5.	"Gaufre to Kimi"
6.	"You're in my way"
7.	"Dousuru? Dousuru? Dousuru?"
8.	"HEY! OHISAMA!"
9.	"Additional Time"
10.	"Koe no Ashiato"
11.	"Nandodemo Nandodemo"
12.	"Saisho no Byakko"
13.	"Tteka"
14.	"Boku Nanka"
15.	"One Choice"
16.	"Am I Ready?"
17.	"JOYFUL LOVE (Live from Happy Train Tour 2023)" (Bonus Track)

=== Type B ===
No.	Title	Length
1.	"Additional Time"
2.	"Kimi wa Zero kara Ichi ni Nare"
3.	"Tteka"
4.	"Coelacanth"
5.	"Pakuchi Piiman Guriinpiisu"
6.	"Sekai ni wa Thank you! ga Afureteiru"
7.	"Mayonaka no Zange Taikai"
8.	"HEY! OHISAMA!"
9.	"Hikoukigumo ga Dekiru Riyuu"
10.	"Koi wa Nigeashi ga Hayai"
11.	"Jihanki to Shutaisei"
12.	"Kimi Shika Katan"
13.	"Am I Ready?"
14.	"Boku Nanka"
15.	"One Choice"
16.	"Tsuki to Hoshi ga Odoru Midnight"
17.	"Dare Yori mo Takaku Tobe! 2020 (Live from Happy Train Tour 2023)" (Bonus Track)

=== Regular Edition ===
No.	Title	Length
1.	"HEY! OHISAMA!"
2.	"Kimi wa Zero kara Ichi ni Nare"
3.	"Am I Ready?"
4.	"Tteka"
5.	"Mita Koto Nai Mamono"
6.	"Right?"
7.	"Koishita Sakana wa Sora o Tobu"
8.	"Ai wa Kocchi no Mono da"
9.	"Glass Mado ga Yogoreteru"
10.	"Additional Time"
11.	"Seishun Popcorn"
12.	"Rock Climbing"
13.	"Kimi Shika Katan"
14.	"Tsuki to Hoshi ga Odoru Midnight"
15.	"Boku Nanka"
16.	"One Choice"
17.	"Kitsune (Live from Happy Train Tour 2023)" (Bonus Track)

== Personnel ==
Lineups for new songs obtained from official website.

=== "Kimi wa Zero kara Ichi ni Nare" ===
Center: Kumi Sasaki

- 1st row: Mirei Sasaki, Nao Kosaka, Kumi Sasaki, Hinano Kamimura, Miku Kanemura
- 2nd row: Mei Higashimura, Hina Kawata, Kyōko Saitō, Shiho Katō, Konoka Matsuda, Suzuka Tomita
- 3rd row: Ayaka Takamoto, Haruyo Yamaguchi, Hiyori Hamagishi, Sarina Ushio, Mikuni Takahashi, Mana Takase, Marie Morimoto

=== "Saisho no Byakuya" ===
Center: Sarina Ushio

- 1st row: Kyōko Saitō, Sarina Ushio, Shiho Katō
- 2nd row: Kumi Sasaki, Mirei Sasaki, Mana Takase, Ayaka Takamoto, Mei Higashimura

=== "Jihanki to Shutaisei" ===
Center: Konoka Matsuda

- 1st row: Suzuka Tomita, Konoka Matsuda, Hiyori Hamagishi
- 2nd row: Miku Kanemura, Hina Kawata, Nao Kosaka

=== "Seishun Popcorn" ===
Center: Marie Morimoto

- 1st row: Marie Morimoto
- 2nd row: Hinano Kamimura, Haruyo Yamaguchi
- 3rd row: Mikuni Takahashi

=== "Rock Climbing" ===
Center: Honoka Hirao

- 1st row: Kaho Fujishima, Honoka Hirao, Yōko Shōgenji
- 2nd row: Sumire Miyachi, Mitsuki Hiraoka, Rio Shimizu, Haruka Yamashita
- 3rd row: Rina Watanabe, Nanami Konishi, Tamaki Ishizuka, Kirari Takeuchi

== Charts ==
=== Weekly charts ===
Weekly chart performance for Myaku'utsu Kanjō
Chart (2023)	Peak position
Japan (Japan Hot Albums)	1
Japanese Albums (Oricon)	1

=== Monthly charts ===
Monthly chart performance for Myaku'utsu Kanjō
Chart (2023)	Position
Japan (Oricon)	3
