= Uni's On Air =

Japanese rhythm game released in 2019

- 2021 promotional image, featuring Hono Tamura (lead singer of "Nagaredama") and Miku Kanemura (lead singer of "Tteka")
- Developer: Akatsuki Inc.
- Publishers: Seed & Flower
- Platforms: Android, iOS
- Release: JP: 24 September 2019
- Genre: Rhythm game

Uni's On Air (Japanese: ユニゾンエアー, Hepburn: Yunizoneā; stylized in all caps) is a Japanese rhythm game developed by Akatsuki Inc. and published by Seed & Flower. The game features songs and members from the idol groups Sakurazaka46 (Keyakizaka46) and Hinatazaka46. The game is only released in Japan and not available worldwide.

== Gameplay ==
The game's main gameplay is in "Live" mode, in which players tap on the five buttons at the bottom of the screen at the proper time to receive a score. A combo score multiplier is given for maintaining a chain of consecutive hits without missing notes. Concert footage of the songs are played in the background. Scores are then classified into C, B, A, S, SS, or SSS rank, with C being lowest and SSS being highest. Songs are divided into three difficulties: "Normal", "Pro", and "Master"; a fourth "Pro+" is available for select songs. A "Live" difficulty level is provided just to watch the concert footage.

There are a total of 57 songs included. Songs span all Sakurazaka46 and Keyakizaka46 singles, Hiragana Keyakizaka46's album Hashiridasu Shunkan, and 3 of Hinatazaka46's single "Kyun", "Do Re Mi Sol La Si Do" & "Konna ni Suki ni Natchatte Ii no?". "Dare no Koto o Ichiban Aishiteru?" from AKB48's Bokutachi wa, Ano Hi no Yoake o Shitteiru was added into the game as part of Keyakizaka46's 3rd Year Anniversary Live.

=== Team formation ===
Uni's On Air utilizes a gacha system known as "photography" (撮影) to acquire cards known as "scenes" (シーン) that feature a member of Sakurazaka46 or Hinatazaka46. Cards are classified into five colors: red, blue, green, yellow, or purple; they are also classified into three rarities: R, SR, and SSR. These cards can then be built into five-unit teams; using the same color card as the song yields a higher score.

Cards may be leveled up in two ways. In "level lesson" (Lv レッスン), players may increase the card's level through "lesson points". In "talent blossoming" (才能開花), players upgrade specific attributes in a hierarchical order. Talent blossoming also unlocks other content, including more pictures, interview footage, voice recordings, and costumes.

=== Other content ===
The game also features an "office" (事務所), where players can talk to members, decorate the rooms, and offer "catering" (ケータリング) in exchange for in-game currency. "Dramas" are also included, where players can watch fictional stories featuring the members.

== Release and reception ==
Uni's On Air was first announced by Akatsuki on 18 July 2019; the official website was released on the same day. The game was available for download on 23 September 2019 and gameplay began on the 24th later. A day later on the 25th, Akatsuki reported that the game had hit a million downloads.

The game was recognized in the "popular games" category in the 2019 App Ape Awards.
