= Hinatazaka46 =

Japanese idol group

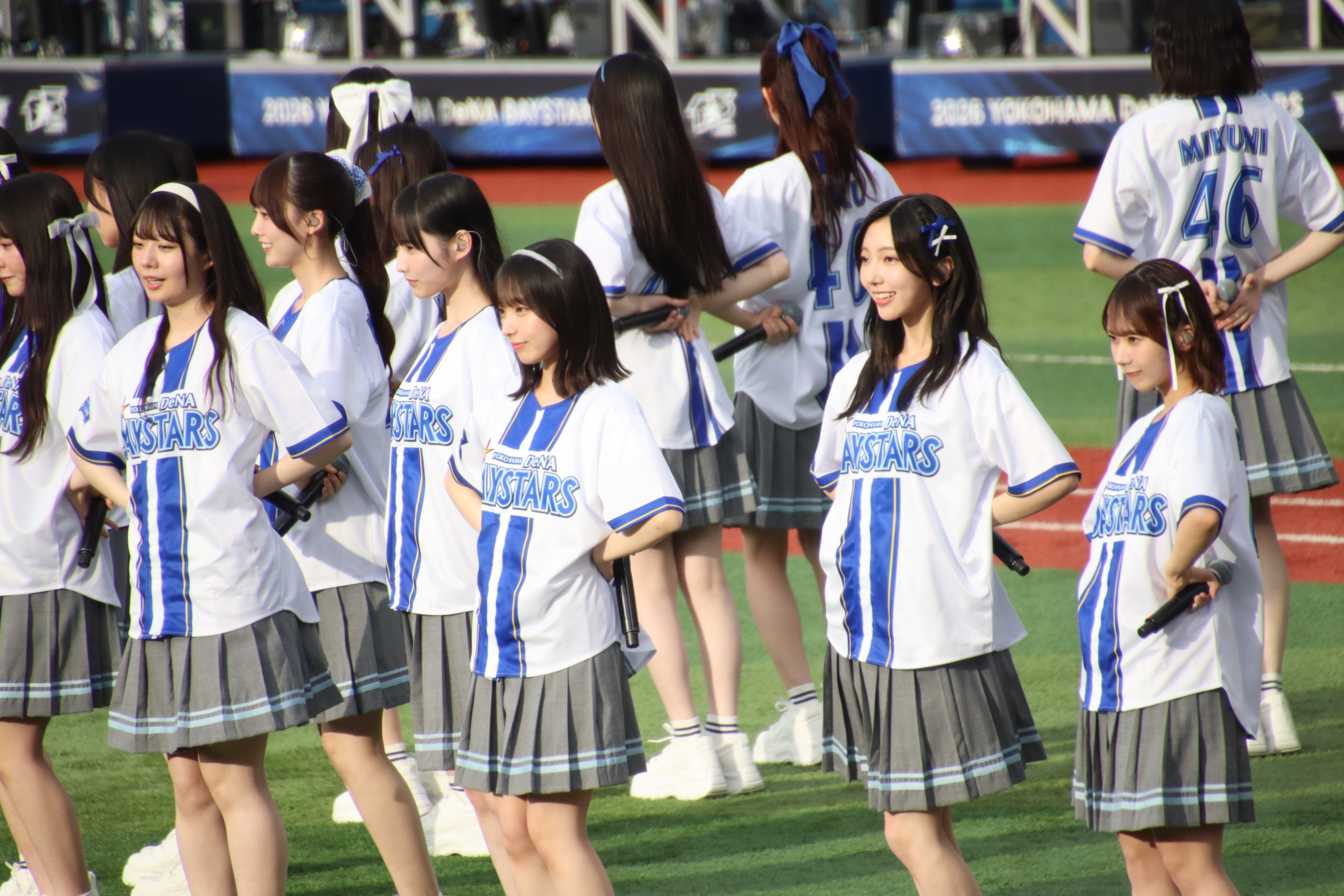
- Hinatazaka46 members in 2026

Background information
- Also known as: Hiragana Keyakizaka46
- Origin: Japan
- Genre: J-pop
- Years active: 2015–present
- Label: Sony Music Records
- Spinoff of: Sakurazaka46
- Members: See members
- Website: Official website

Hinatazaka46 (Japanese: 日向坂46) is a Japanese idol group produced by Yasushi Akimoto. The group was established as a subgroup of Keyakizaka46 named Hiragana Keyakizaka46 on 30 November 2015, and was renamed and spun off into its own group on 11 February 2019. The group's name is adopted from the alternate reading of Hyūgazaka Street in Mita, Minato-ku, Tokyo, following the custom of naming groups after sloping streets in the Sakamichi Series. The captain of the group is Mikuni Takahashi and its fans are referred to as Ohisama (おひさま).

As a subgroup of Keyakizaka46, Hiragana Keyakizaka46's works were released as part of the main group's releases, except for the album Hashiridasu Shunkan (2018). As of May 2026, Hinatazaka46 has released seventeen singles and two albums, and its first single, "Kyun", is the best-selling debut single by a female artist in Japan. Members of the group have also appeared in television dramas such as Re:Mind (2017), Dasada (2020), and Koeharu! (2021), the weekly variety show Hinatazaka de Aimashō, as well as a feature film and two theatrically released documentaries.

== History ==
=== 2015–2018: Hiragana Keyakizaka46 ===
Hiragana Keyakizaka46 logo

The group was established as Hiragana Keyakizaka46 (けやき坂46) on 30 November 2015, as a subgroup of Keyakizaka46, with their name written in hiragana as opposed to kanji. (Note: Normally, using different writing systems would cause no difference in reading, and Keyakizaka46 (欅坂46) and Hiragana Keyakizaka46 (けやき坂46) would be read the exact same way as "Keyakizaka46". In Japanese-language media, mentions of Hiragana Keyakizaka46 were often followed by an explanation on the reading.) Colloquially, Hiragana Keyakizaka46 was also known as Hiragana Keyaki, while the main Keyakizaka46 group was known as Kanji Keyaki.

At its founding, Hiragana Keyakizaka46 consisted of only one member, Neru Nagahama, who did not participate in the Keyakizaka46 final audition due to her parents' earlier disapproval and was assigned to the subgroup as a "special case"; she would later be appointed a "concurrent" (兼任, ken'nin) member of both groups and join the main Keyakizaka46 lineup starting from their second single, "Sekai ni wa Ai Shika Nai" (2016). Auditions were held soon after for Hiragana Keyakizaka46, and the first generation of eleven members joined the group in May 2016. The group was initially announced as the "under" group to Keyakizaka46 with the possibility of its members also being selected for the main group's song lineup, a system already practiced by Nogizaka46. Due to the two groups' increasing activities, Nagahama left Hiragana Keyakizaka46 in September 2017, becoming only a member of the main group. A second generation of nine people was added in August 2017, and a third, again consisting of only Hinano Kamimura, was added in November 2018 through a Sakamichi Series joint audition. Kumi Sasaki was appointed the group's captain in June 2018.

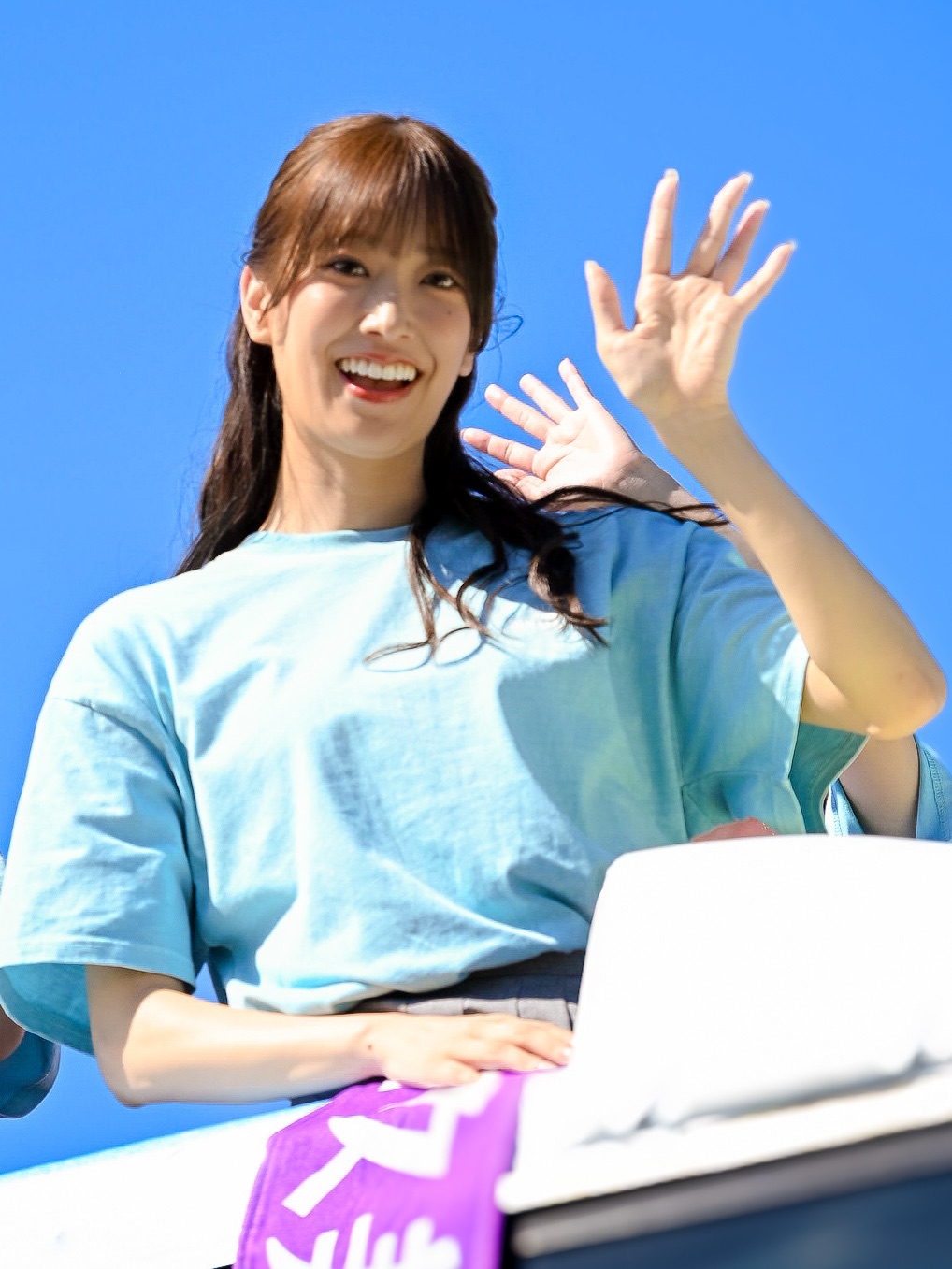
Kumi Sasaki, first captain of Hinatazaka46

As a subgroup, Hiragana Keyakizaka46 released their music as part of the main group's singles and albums. Their first release as a group is the B-side "Hiragana Keyaki" (ひらがなけやき) from "Sekai ni wa Ai Shika Nai", although Nagahama did perform "Noriokureta Bus" (乗り遅れたバス; lit. 'Missed Bus') from Keyakizaka46's debut single "Silent Majority" (2016) with several Keyakizaka46 members. In concerts, the two groups often performed together, but Hiragana Keyakizaka46 also held independent concerts, including a nationwide Zepp tour in 2017 and a three-day Nippon Budokan performance in January 2018, after Keyakizaka46 pulled out due to lead singer Yurina Hirate's injury. Hiragana Keyakizaka46 also released an independent album in 2018 titled Hashiridasu Shunkan.

In terms of variety shows, Hiragana Keyakizaka46 initially appeared in Keyakizaka46's shows Keyakitte, Kakenai? and KeyaBingo!, and started their own show Hiragana Oshi in 2018. The first generation also appeared in the drama series Re:Mind in 2017.

From April to May 2018, Hiragana Keyakizaka46 members performed in the stage play Ayumi written by Yukio Shiba, where the characters (which consist of people of various ages and genders, as well as animals) was portrayed by different members on every scene change. The play was released on Hulu Japan in February 2021.

=== 2019–2023: Reborn as Hinatazaka46 ===
Hinatazaka46 logo

Hiragana Keyakizaka46 became an independent group on 11 February 2019, and was renamed Hinatazaka46. The new name is an alternate reading of Hyūgazaka (日向坂) street in Minato-ku, Tokyo, following the custom of Sakamichi Series of having its groups named after sloping streets. The group's official Twitter and TikTok accounts were launched shortly, and their variety TV program was renamed to Hinatazaka de Aimashō. They also announced in a Showroom live broadcast that their fandom name would be Ohisama (おひさま), which is a slang for the Sun, as "just like a sunny place (日向, hinata) cannot exist without the Sun, [Hinatazaka46] cannot exist without the fans".

Their first single, "Kyun", was released on 27 March 2019, and surpassed 476,000 copies sold within the first week. The single became the best-selling debut single by a female artist in Japan, a record previously held by Keyakizaka46's "Silent Majority". "Kyun" also won the Best Choreography award at the 2019 MTV Video Music Awards. On 24 September, a rhythm game titled Uni's On Air was released that featured Keyakizaka46 and Hinatazaka46. Hinatazaka46 attended the 70th NHK Kōhaku Uta Gassen for the first time in the group's history, where they performed "Kyun". After that, "Azato Kawaii" was shown at the 71st NHK Kōhaku Uta Gassen, and "Kimi Shika Katan" was performed at the 72nd NHK Kōhaku Uta Gassen, and "Kitsune" was performed at the 73rd NHK Kōhaku Uta Gassen. On 16 January 2020, the members of Hinatazaka46 were featured in a television series titled Dasada, with Nao Kosaka as the main protagonist. On 16 February 2020, three members were added to the third generation from the remaining unassigned members of the 2018 Sakamichi Series joint audition, bringing that generation up to four people. On 31 July 2020, Hinatazaka46 live streamed a concert titled Hinatazaka46 Live Online, Yes! With You!, where they announced that their first studio album will be released on 23 September. Their mascot character, a sky blue bird named Poka, was introduced at the live streamed Hinakuri (Hina Christmas) 2020 concert on 24 December.

On 7 March 2022, the group announced the audition for their fourth generation members with applications starting that day and screening taking place on 4 April. Twelve members passed the audition out of 51,038 participants, and they were gradually introduced to the public from 22 September to 3 October. They would make their musical debut with the song "Blueberry & Raspberry", included on the group's 8th single, "Tsuki to Hoshi ga Odoru Midnight". It was first shown at the Happy Smile Tour 2022 in Tokyo held on 12–13 November 2022.

On 30–31 March 2022, the group held their long-sought first Tokyo Dome concert, "Hinatazaka46 3rd Anniversary Memorial Live in Tokyo Dome" (3周年記念 Memorial Live ～3回目のひな誕祭～), attended by about 100,000 people in two days. The concert was originally scheduled for 2020, but postponed twice due to the COVID-19 pandemic.

From 30 March 2023, the Hinatazaka46 official website will start supporting in Japanese, English, Simplified Chinese, Traditional Chinese, and Korean.

On 19 April 2023, the group announced the launching of the Hinatazaka Channel on YouTube for content other than music.

=== 2024–present: Adopting the senbatsu system, Hinata Fes in Miyazaki ===
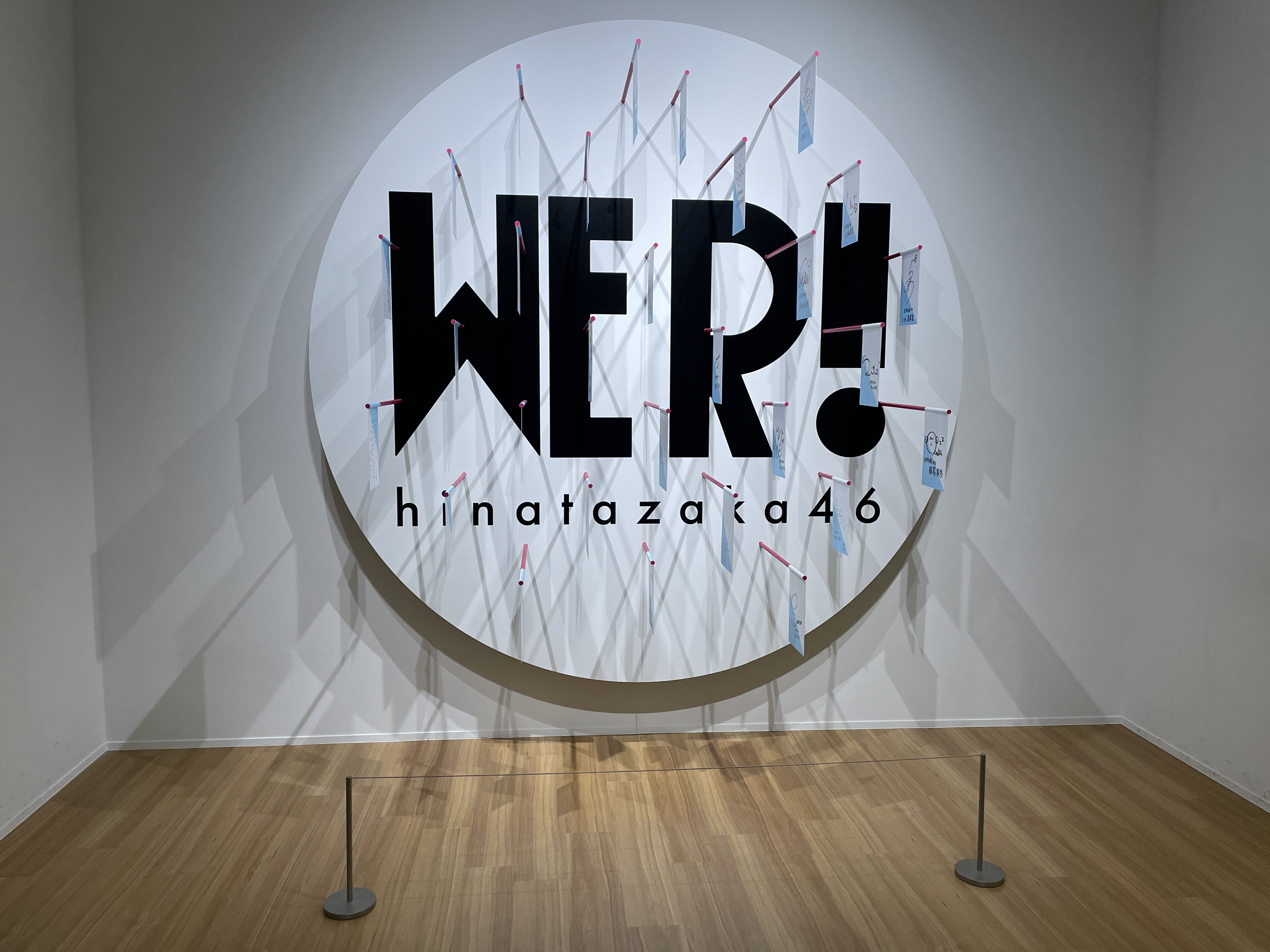
An installation at the "WE R!" exhibition at Roppongi Museum, featuring messages from the members.

In March 2024, Hinatazaka46 opened its first exhibition, titled "WE R!", showcasing the group's history and various memorabilia. It consisted of the "WE R!" exhibition at the Roppongi Museum, held 1 March–13 May, and the "WE R! in Tokyo Skytree﹣Rainbow of Hinatazaka46" (WE R! in Tokyo Skytree﹣日向坂46の虹, WE R! in Tokyo Skytree﹣Hinatazaka46 no Niji) exhibition at the Tokyo Skytree, held 12 March–12 June.

On 5 April, Kyōko Saitō parted ways with the group with a "graduation" concert held at the Yokohama Stadium. She is the first member to leave who had served as original center (lead singer) for a title song, 2022's "Tsuki to Hoshi ga Odoru Midnight".

The 11th single, "Kimi wa Honeydew", released on 8 May, marked a significant change in the group's organization. While all active first to third-generation members participated in the title songs of previous releases, "Kimi wa Honeydew" is the first Hinatazaka46 release to implement a senbatsu (選抜, lit. 'selection') system, in which 16 selected members from all generations active at the time would perform the title song. Members who were not selected, commonly known as "under girls", are referred to as Hiragana Hinatazaka46 (ひなた坂46), similar to Hinatazaka46's former name Hiragana Keyakizaka46 (けやき坂46), and performed their own B-side song. Real Sound commented that this change was likely caused by the continuing departures of the group's founding first generation members, as well as the "rapid" development of the fourth generation members, five of whom were included in the single's senbatsu.

Hiragana Hinatazaka46's first independent concert would be held on 3−4 July at the Pacifico Yokohama convention center, continuing the usual practice of holding independent concerts for non-senbatsu members in the Sakamichi Series.

On 4 August, Hinatazaka46 announced that the recruitment process for the fifth generation members would begin on 5 August. On 10 March 2025, a teaser video was released on the Hinatazaka Channel, followed by individual introduction videos for the 10 new members over the following days.

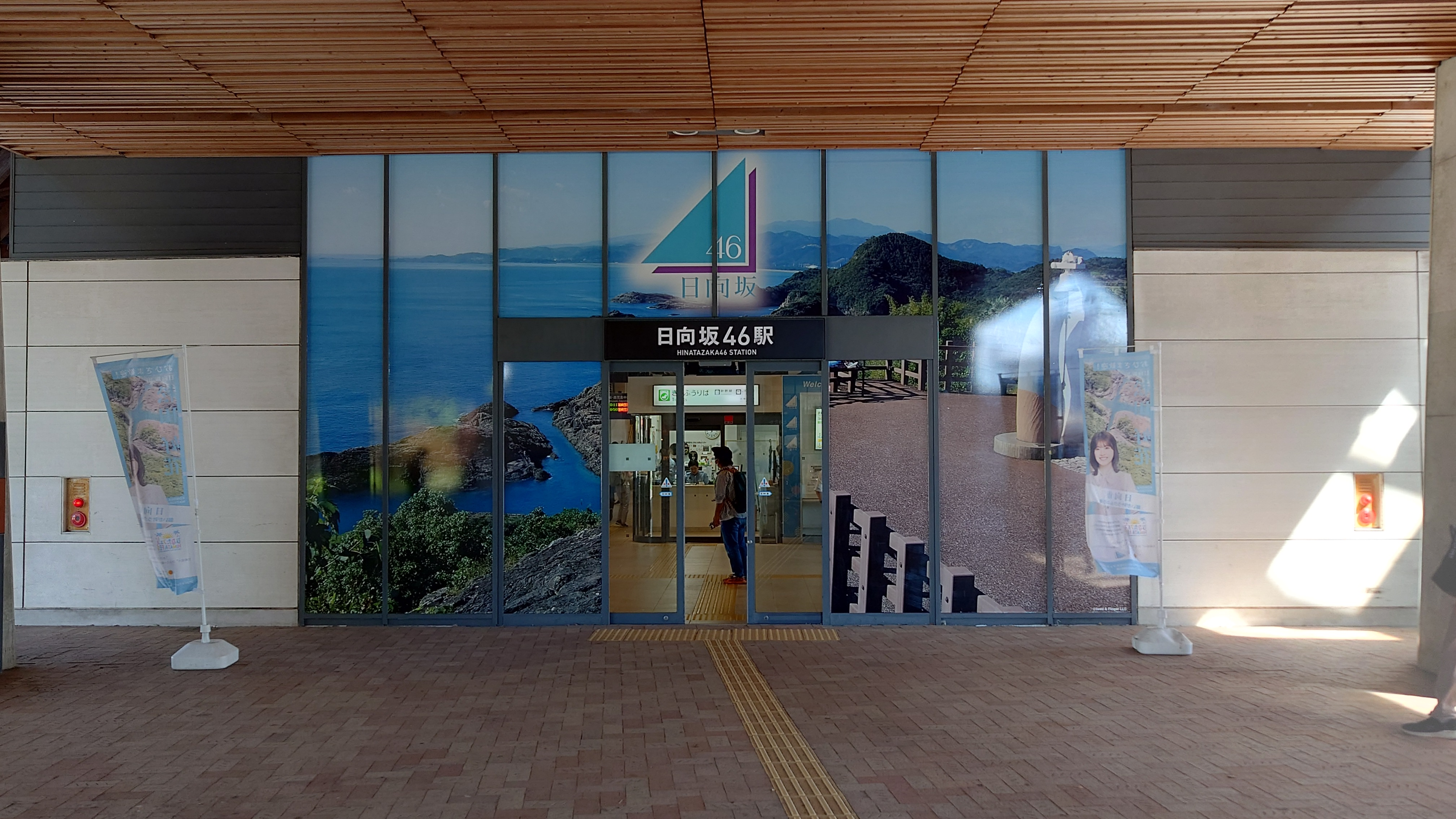
The Hyūgashi Station was temporarily renamed to Hinatazaka46 Station for the Hinata Fes.

On 7–8 September, Hinatazaka46 held the first Hinata Fes in Miyazaki Prefecture, also known as the "Hinata of Japan" (日本のひなた, Nihon no Hinata). The group had previously visited the prefecture in 2019 for location shooting of the variety show Hinatazaka de Aimashō, and member Mirei Sasaki first proposed the event in early 2024 on the same show. Approximately 40 thousand people attended the event, consisting of a two-day ticketed concert at the Hinata Sun Marine Stadium—the first concert ever held at the venue—and a free festival at the nearby Hinata Miyazaki Prefectural Comprehensive Sports Park. To accommodate the influx of attendees, the Kyushu Railway Company operated additional train services, including those named Hinatazaka46 and Ohisama, and the Hyūgashi Station was temporarily renamed to Hinatazaka46 Station. A 460-meter slope leading up to the Sea Cross Overlook in Hyūga, which overlook the cross-shaped reef where the fourth-generation members filmed their debut videos, was also permanently named "Hinatazaka" on August 2, with members Mirei Sasaki and Miku Kanemura attending the ceremony. The festival also aimed to minimize its impact on the environment and revitalize the economy of the region; the University of Miyazaki estimated that the festival brought about an economic ripple effect of about 2.9 billion yen from tourism in Miyazaki and surrounding areas, while the Kyushu Economic Research Center estimated an economic impact of 4.33 billion yen for the Kyushu region as a whole.

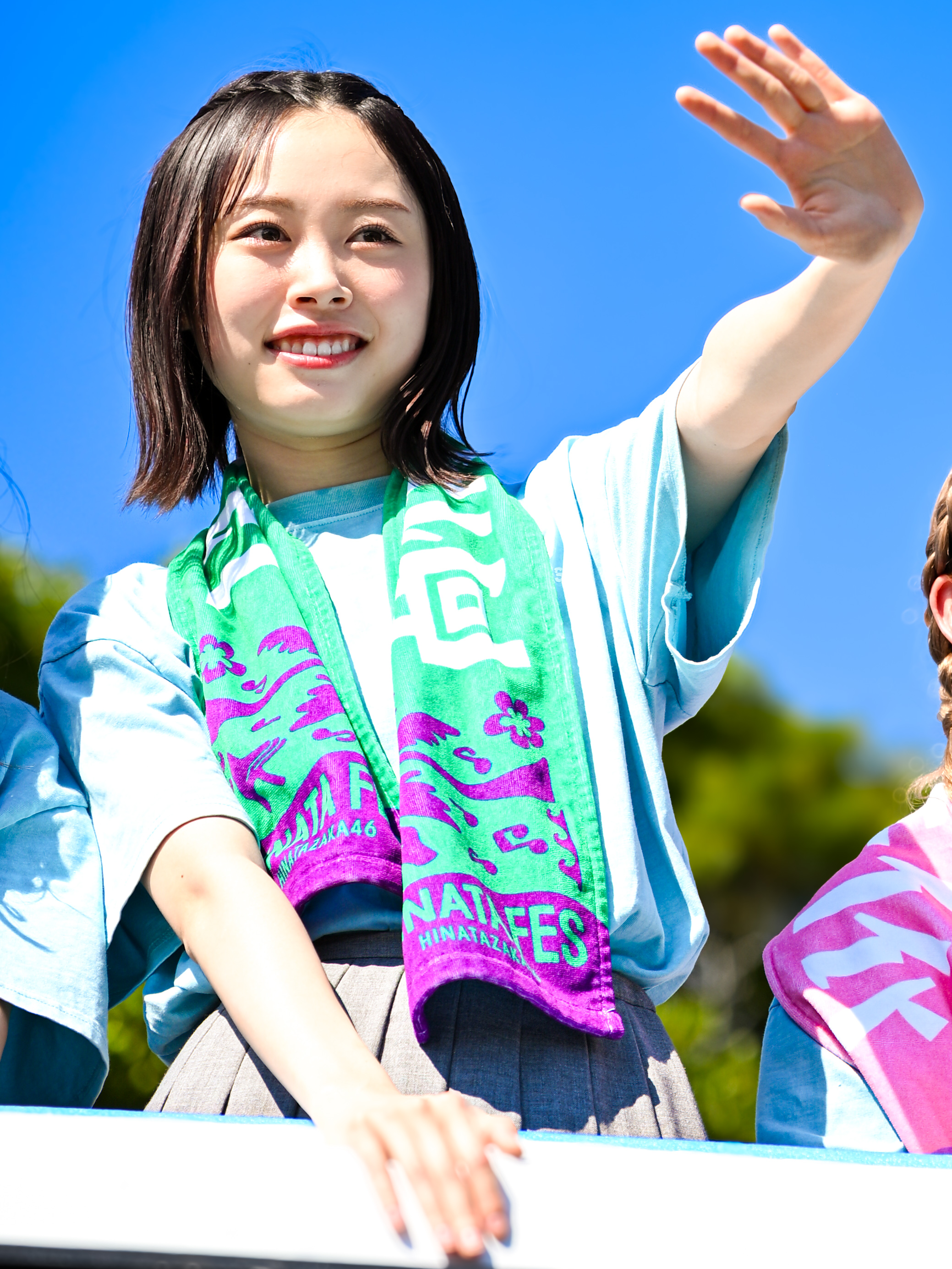
Mikuni Takahashi, second captain of Hinatazaka46

On November 7, Mikuni Takahashi was announced to have been appointed as the first vice-captain of Hinatazaka46. On 6 January 2025, Kumi Sasaki, Mirei Sasaki and Mana Takase, the three remaining first generation members, announced that they would depart from the group after promotions for the 13th single have concluded. Kumi and Mirei Sasaki's graduation ceremonies took place as part of the 6th Hinatansai anniversary concert at the Yokohama Stadium on 5−6 April, while Takase's would take place as part of the 13th Single Hiragana Hinatazaka46 concert at the Makuhari Messe on 1 May. Takahashi was appointed to succeed Kumi Sasaki as captain on the second day of the 6th Hinatansai on 6 April.

The Brand New Live: Over the Rainbow concert on 28–29 May at the Yoyogi National Stadium was the first group live performance without the founding members. The 14th single, "Love Yourself!", became the first music release both without any founding members and to feature the fifth generation. Hinatazaka46 made a surprise appearance in the graduation ceremony of Nihon University, of which member Miku Kanemura was a graduate, at the Nippon Budokan on 25 March 2026 and performed six songs for 16 thousand new graduates. The group was scheduled to hold the second Hinata Fes in Miyazaki Prefecture on 5–6 September 2026; however, the event was cancelled on 2 September due to concerns over Typhoon Krovanh. Despite the cancellation, Nikkan Gendai noted that a sizable number of fans visited the prefecture anyway, highlighting the "deep relationship" between fans and the local community and the significance of Miyazaki as a "holy site" for fans.

== Awards ==
List of Hinatazaka46 awards and nominations
Year	Ceremony	Award	Nominated work	Source
2018	Mnet Asian Music Awards	Best New Asian Artist Japan		
2019	2019 MTV VMAJ	Best Choreography	"Kyun"	
2019	61st Japan Record Awards	Outstanding Works Award	"Do Re Mi Sol La Si Do"	
2019	Yahoo! Search Awards	Idol Category Award		
2019	Line News Presents News Awards	Idol Category Award		
2020	2020 MTV VMAJ	Best Choreography	"Seishun no Uma"	
2021	2021 MTV VMAJ	Best Art Direction Video	"Tteka"	
2023	2023 MTV VMAJ	Best Cinematography	"Am I Ready?"	

== Members ==
Since its founding, Hinatazaka46 has had a total of 47 members from five generations. 26 of those members are still in the group.

- Miku Kanemura (金村美玖)
- Nao Kosaka (小坂菜緒)
- Hinano Kamimura (上村ひなの)
- Mikuni Takahashi (髙橋未来虹) (captain)
- Marie Morimoto (森本茉莉)
- Tamaki Ishizuka (石塚瑶季)
- Nanami Konishi (小西夏菜実)
- Rio Shimizu (清水理央)
- Yōko Shōgenji (正源司陽子)
- Kirari Takeuchi (竹内希来里)
- Honoka Hirao (平尾帆夏)
- Mitsuki Hiraoka (平岡海月)
- Kaho Fujishima (藤嶌果歩)
- Sumire Miyachi (宮地すみれ)
- Haruka Yamashita (山下葉留花)
- Rina Watanabe (渡辺莉奈)
- Mizuki Ōta (大田美月)
- Manami Ōno (大野愛実)
- Saki Katayama (片山紗希)
- Hinano Kuramori (蔵盛妃那乃)
- Nīna Sakai (坂井新奈)
- Yū Satō (佐藤優羽)
- Izuki Shimoda (下田衣珠季)
- Rika Takai (高井俐香)
- Niko Tsurusaki (鶴崎仁香)
- Sakura Matsuo (松尾桜)

== Notable subgroups ==
These are the subgroups of Hinatazaka46 that have appeared in events independent of the group.

=== Hana-chans ===
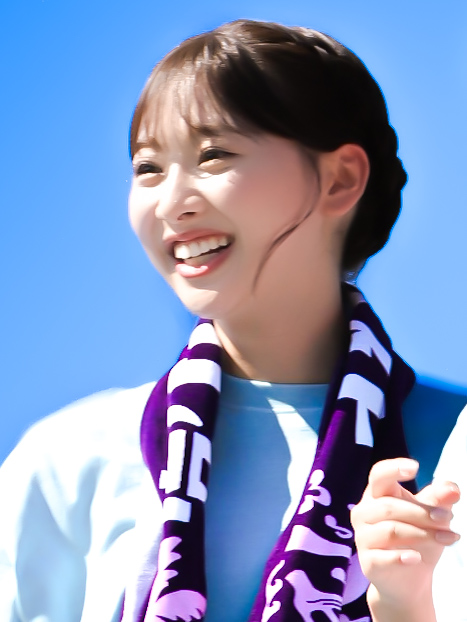
Suzuka Tomita

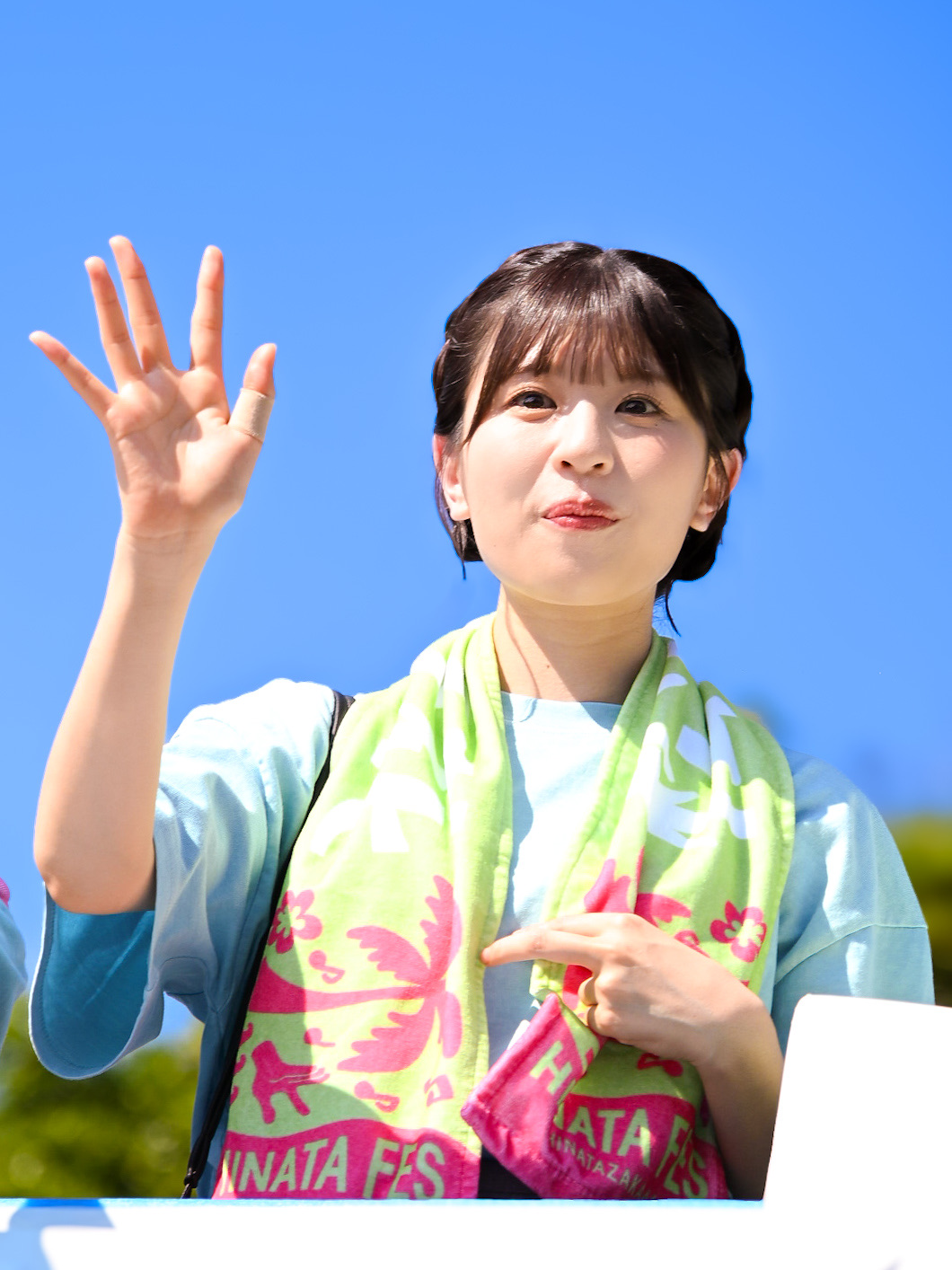
Konoka Matsuda

Hana-chans members

Members: Suzuka Tomita (former), Konoka Matsuda (former)

Hana-chans (花ちゃんズ, Hanachanzu) is an acoustic guitar duo unit, named after the flower (花, hana) kanji in both members' names. Their first song as a duo, "Masaka Gūzen..." (まさか偶然・・・; lit. 'Such Coincidence...'), was released as part of Hinatazaka46's third single.

On 27 June 2021, Hana-chans held their first independent live show on MTV Japan, titled MTV Acoustic Flowers – Until Full Bloom "Bell & Like"-, in which they covered Hinatazaka46 songs and Taylor Swift's "We Are Never Ever Getting Back Together". The performance was originally planned as a concert scheduled for 3 March 2020, but was postponed due to the COVID-19 pandemic; "Until Full Bloom" was a reference to the postponed event, while "bell" (鈴, suzu) and "like" (好, konomu) were references to the duo's given names.

On 5 October, the duo served as the opening act for MTV Live Match 2021, and also performed as part of Hinatazaka46 for the main event.

=== Saitama Trio/Color Chart ===
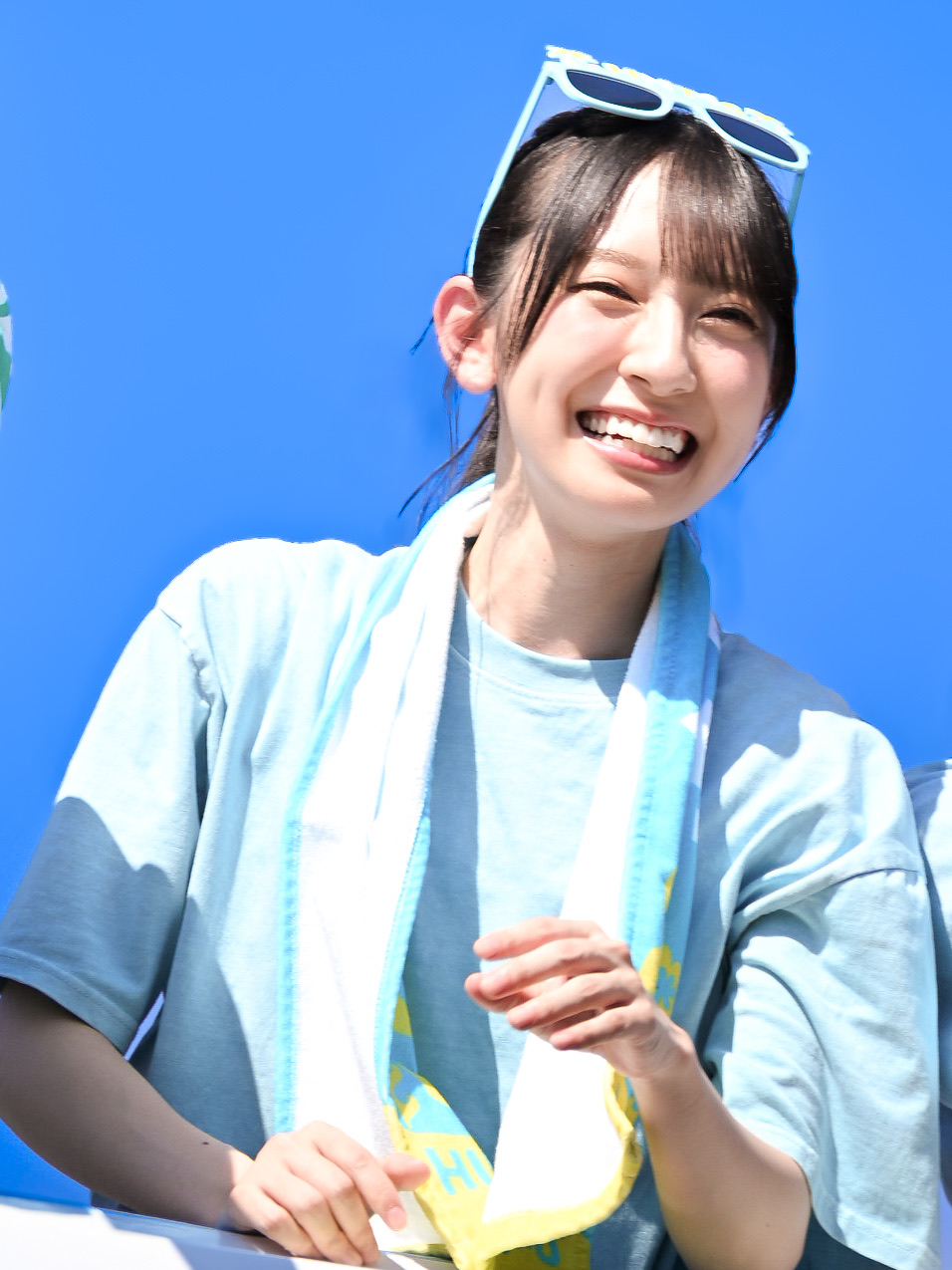
Miku Kanemura

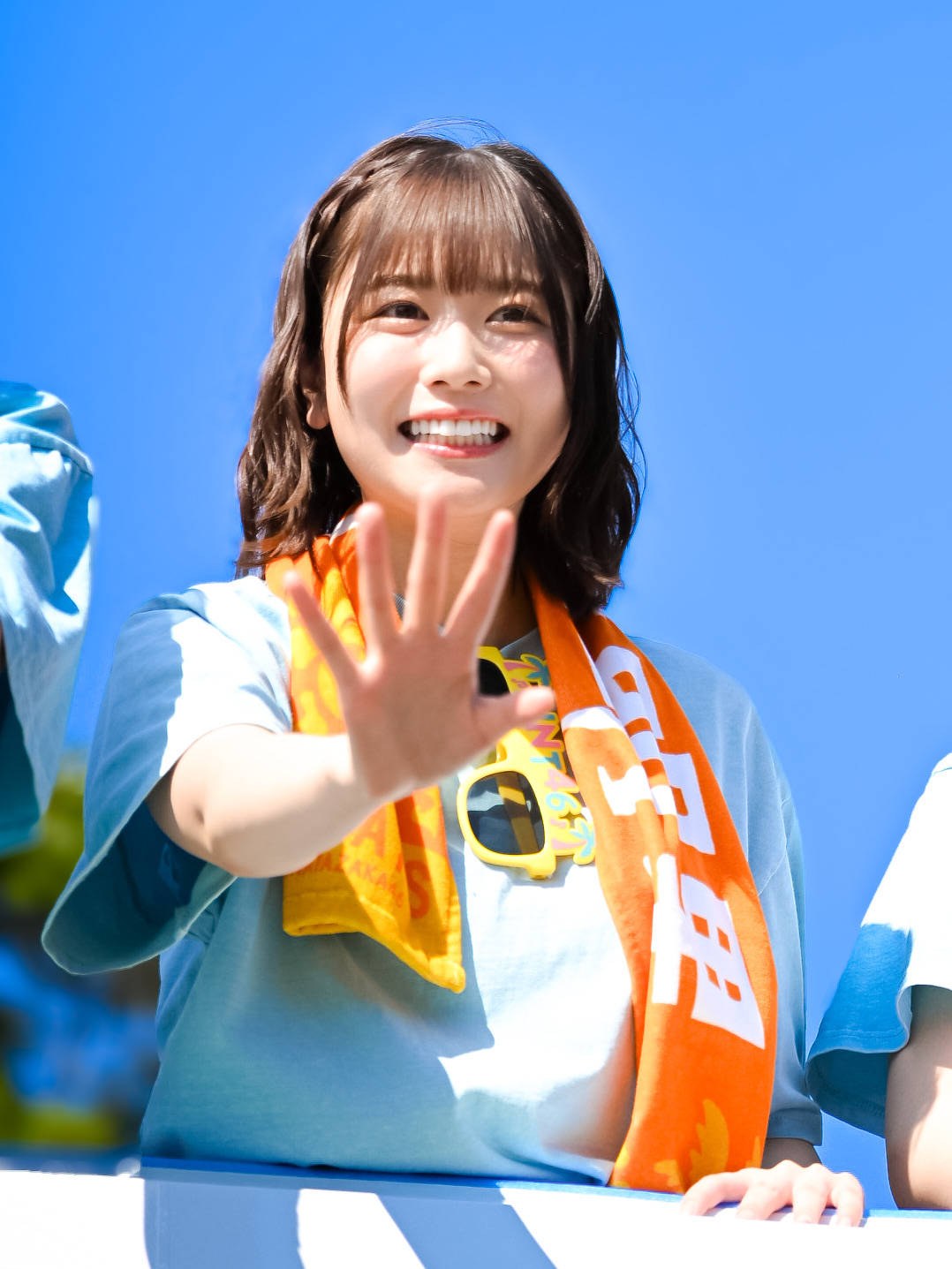
Akari Nibu

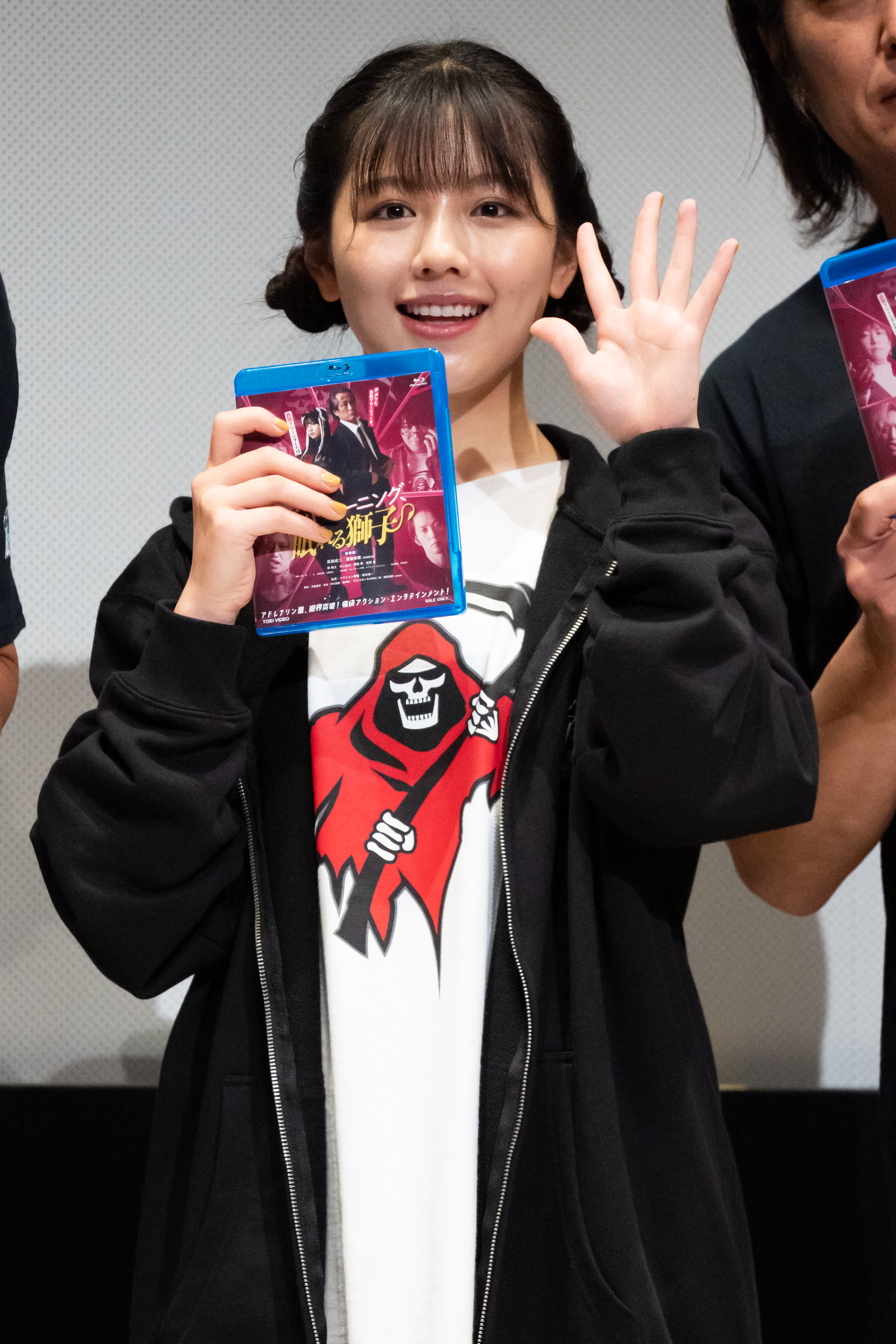
Miho Watanabe

Color Chart original members

Members: Miku Kanemura, Akari Nibu (former), Miho Watanabe (former)

The Saitama Trio (埼玉トリオ), or Saitama Sannin-gumi (埼玉3人組), was the unofficial name for the three Hinatazaka46 members, all from the second generation, who are natives of Saitama Prefecture. In September 2018, they served as one-day traffic chiefs of the Saitama Prefectural Police to promote traffic safety. In November 2020, they joined the Saitama Supporters Group (埼玉応援団, Saitama Ōen-dan), a public relations group consisting of popular artists from the prefecture.

In October 2020, the trio started the radio program Belc presents Hinatazaka46 no Yokei na Kotomade Yarimashō! (Note: ベルク presents 日向坂46の余計な事までやりましょう!; transl. Belc presents Hinatazaka46's Let's Go the Extra Mile!) on Tokyo FM; the supermarket chain Belc, which sponsors the program, subsequently released limited edition food products in collaboration with them. They also became voice actresses for the first animated miniseries based on the character Pickles the Frog, which first became associated with Hiragana Keyakizaka46 in 2017 after Kanemura gave a Pickles doll to each second generation member as Christmas presents.

In February 2021, the Saitama Trio were voted the most wanted unit (subgroup with their own songs) by fans on a Twitter campaign to commemorate Hinatazaka46's second debut anniversary. Hinatazaka46's sixth single, released in October 2021, would include their first song as a trio, "Akubi Letter" (あくびLetter; lit. 'Yawn Letter'), performed under the unit name Color Chart (カラーチャート); the name is a reference to a nickname for Saitama Prefecture, "Sai no Kuni" (彩の国; transl. Land of Colors).

== Discography ==
Hinatazaka46 discography
- Studio albums: 1
- Singles: 9
- Video albums: 1
- Music videos: 40

Hiragana Keyakizaka46 discography
- Studio albums: 1
- Music videos: 9

=== Studio albums ===
List of studio albums, with selected chart positions, sales and certifications
Title	Details	Peak chart positions		Sales	Certifications
Title	Details	JPN	JPN Hot	Sales	Certifications
Hashiridasu Shunkan (as Hiragana Keyakizaka46)	Released: 20 June 2018; Label: Sony Music; Format: CD, CD+Blu-ray, digital download, streaming	1	1	JPN: 185,472	RIAJ: Gold
Hinatazaka	Released: 23 September 2020; Label: Sony Music; Format: CD, CD+Blu-ray, digital download, streaming	1	1	JPN: 246,553	RIAJ: Platinum
Myakuutsu Kanjō	Released: 8 November 2023; Label: Sony Music; Format: CD, CD+Blu-ray, digital download, streaming	1	1	JPN: 148,006	RIAJ: Gold

=== Singles ===
List of singles, with selected chart positions, showing year released, sales, certifications and album name
Title	Year	Peak chart positions		Sales	Certifications	Album
Title	Year	JPN	JPN Hot	Sales	Certifications	Album
"Kyun" (キュン)	2019	1	1	JPN: 621,565 (phy.); JPN: 17,709 (dig.)	RIAJ: 2× Platinum (phy.); Gold (st.)	Hinatazaka
"Do Re Mi Sol La Si Do" (ドレミソラシド)	2019	1	1	JPN: 535,090 (phy.); JPN: 9,854 (dig.)	RIAJ: 2× Platinum (phy.)	Hinatazaka
"Konna ni Suki ni Natchatte Ii no?" (こんなに好きになっちゃっていいの?)	2019	1	1	JPN: 551,397 (phy.); JPN: 9,221 (dig.)	RIAJ: 2× Platinum (phy.)	Hinatazaka
"Sonna Koto Nai yo" (ソンナコトナイヨ)	2020	1	1	JPN: 644,135 (phy.); JPN: 9,811 (dig.)	RIAJ: 2× Platinum (phy.)	Hinatazaka
"Kimi Shika Katan" (君しか勝たん)	2021	1	2	JPN: 553,714 (phy.); JPN: 7,150 (dig.)	RIAJ: 2× Platinum (phy.)	Myakuutsu Kanjō
"Tteka" (ってか)	2021	1	1	JPN: 457,932 (phy.); JPN: 7,312 (dig.)	RIAJ: 2× Platinum (phy.)	Myakuutsu Kanjō
"Boku Nanka" (僕なんか)	2022	1	1	JPN: 484,219 (phy.); JPN: 3,862 (dig.)	RIAJ: 2× Platinum (phy.)	Myakuutsu Kanjō
"Tsuki to Hoshi ga Odoru Midnight" (月と星が踊るMidnight)	2022	1	3	JPN: 466,495 (phy.); JPN: 5,163 (dig.)	RIAJ: 2× Platinum (phy.)	Myakuutsu Kanjō
"One Choice"	2023	1	2	JPN: 506,557 (phy.); JPN: 3,328 (dig.)	RIAJ: 2× Platinum (phy.)	Myakuutsu Kanjō
"Am I Ready?"	2023	1	4	JPN: 479,115 (phy.)	RIAJ: 2× Platinum (phy.)	Myakuutsu Kanjō
"Kimi wa Honeydew" (君はハニーデュー)	2024	1	3	JPN: 469,060 (phy.)	RIAJ: 2× Platinum (phy.)	TBA
"Zettaiteki Dairokkan" (絶対的第六感)	2024	1	1	JPN: 508,054 (phy.)	RIAJ: 2× Platinum (phy.)	TBA
"Sotsugyō Shashin Dake ga Shitteru" (卒業写真だけが知ってる)	2025	1	6	JPN: 462,993 (phy.)	RIAJ: 2× Platinum (phy.)	TBA
"Love Yourself!"	2025	1	2	JPN: 448,001 (phy.)	RIAJ: 2× Platinum (phy.)	TBA
"Onegai Bach!" (お願いバッハ!)	2025	1	3	JPN: 475,919 (phy.)	RIAJ: 2× Platinum (phy.)	TBA
"Cliffhanger" (クリフハンガー)	2026	1	3	JPN: 496,010 (phy.)	RIAJ: 2× Platinum (phy.)	TBA
"Kind of Love"	2026	1	1	JPN: 458,507 (phy.)	RIAJ: 2× Platinum (phy.)	TBA
"Ichaicha Mushi" (イチャイチャ虫)	2026	1	1	JPN: 441,860 (phy.)	RIAJ: 2× Platinum (phy.)	TBA
"Archive" (アーカイブ)	2027	To be released				TBA

=== Promotional singles ===
List of promotional singles, with selected chart positions, showing year released, sales and album name
Title	Year	Peak	Sales	Album
Title	Year	JPN Hot	Sales	Album
"Kitaishite Inai Jibun" (期待していない自分)	2018	42		Hashiridasu Shunkan
"Azato Kawaii" (アザトカワイイ)	2020	21	JPN: 7,448 (dig.)	Hinatazaka
"Kimi wa 0 kara 1 ni Nare" (君は0から1になれ)	2023	—		Myakuutsu Kanjō
"Audition" (with Nogizaka46 and Sakurazaka46 as Sakamichi Senbatsu)	2026	32		Non-album promotional single

=== Songs from Keyakizaka46's releases ===
List of songs from Keyakizaka46's releases, with selected chart positions, showing year released and album name
Title	Year	Peak	Single or album
Title	Year	JPN Hot	Single or album
"Noriokureta Bus" (乗り遅れたバス) (Note: Sung with Kanji Keyakizaka46)	2016	—	"Silent Majority"
"Hiragana Keyaki" (ひらがなけやき)	2016	—	"Sekai ni wa Ai Shika Nai"
"Dare Yori mo Takaku Tobe!" (誰よりも高く跳べ!)	2016	—	"Futari Saison"
"W-Keyakizaka no Uta" (W-KEYAKIZAKAの詩)	2017	42	"Fukyōwaon"
"Bokutachi wa Tsukiatteiru" (僕たちは付き合っている)	2017	—	"Fukyōwaon"
"Chinmoku Shita Koibito yo" (沈黙した恋人よ)	2017	—	Masshiro na Mono wa Yogoshitaku naru
"Eien no Hakusen" (永遠の白線)	2017	—	Masshiro na Mono wa Yogoshitaku naru
"Neko no Namae" (猫の名前)	2017	—	Masshiro na Mono wa Yogoshitaku naru
"Taiyō wa Miageru Hito o Erabanai" (太陽は見上げる人を選ばない)	2017	—	Masshiro na Mono wa Yogoshitaku naru
"Soredemo Aruiteru" (それでも歩いてる)	2017	92	"Kaze ni Fukarete mo"
"No War in the Future"	2017	—	"Kaze ni Fukarete mo"
"Ima ni Mite iro" (イマニミテイロ)	2018	—	"Glass wo Ware!"
"Hanbun no Kioku" (半分の記憶)	2018	—	"Glass wo Ware!"
"Happy Aura" (ハッピーオーラ)	2018	—	"Ambivalent"
"Kimi ni Hanashite Okitai Koto" (君に話しておきたいこと)	2019	—	"Kuroi Hitsuji"
"Dakishimete Yaru" (抱きしめてやる)	2019	—	"Kuroi Hitsuji"

=== Guest appearances ===
List of non-single guest appearances, showing year released and single name
Title	Year	Single
"Kokkyo no Nai Jidai" (国境のない時代) (with AKB48, Nogizaka46 and Keyakizaka46 (as SakamichiAKB))	2018	"Jabaja"
"Hatsukoi Door" (初恋ドア) (with AKB48, Nogizaka46 and Keyakizaka46 (as SakamichiAKB))	2019	"Jiwaru Days"

=== Other charted songs ===
List of other charted songs, with selected chart positions, showing year released and single name
Title	Year	Peak	Single
Title	Year	JPN Hot	Single
"Seishun no Uma" (青春の馬)	2020	65	"Sonna Koto Nai yo"

=== Videography ===
==== Video albums ====
List of video albums, with selected chart positions, sales and certifications
Title	Details	Peak chart position		Sales
Title	Details	JPN DVD	JPN BD	Sales
Hinatazaka46 3rd Anniversary Memorial Live in Tokyo Dome	Released: 20 July 2022; Label: Sony Music; Format: DVD, Blu-ray	1	1	JPN: 42,000

== Tours and concerts ==
Hinatazaka46 has held several regular annual concerts. The Hinatansai (ひな誕祭; portmanteau of Hinatazaka and seitansai 生誕祭, lit. 'holy birthday') concerts, held in March or April, are to celebrate their debut anniversary on 27 March 2019. The W-Keyaki Festival (pronounced "Double Keyaki Festival") concerts in the summer were held jointly with Sakurazaka46 in 2021 and 2022 as the two groups formerly known as Keyakizaka46, and were the continuation of the Keyaki Republic (欅共和国, Keyaki Kyōwakoku) concerts held annually by that group at the Fuji-Q Highland Conifer Forest until 2019. The Hiragana Christmas (ひらがなくりすます) concert was held on 11–13 December 2018, and was succeeded by the Hinakuri (ひなくり; short for Hina Christmas) concerts, held on or around Christmas from 2019 to 2022, and would be resumed in 2026.

== Filmography ==
In its early days, Hiragana Keyakizaka46 appeared on the variety shows of its main group Keyakizaka46, such as Keyakitte, Kakenai? and KeyaBingo!. The first drama series starring the group is Re:Mind (2017), broadcast on TV Tokyo and internationally on Netflix, while its first variety show Hiragana Oshi started broadcasting a year later in 2018, before being rebranded to Hinatazaka de Aimashō in 2019 following the group's rebranding to Hinatazaka46. Since then, the group has appeared in HinaBingo! (2019−2020) and the television dramas Dasada (2020) and Koeharu! (2021). On the silver screen, the group has released two documentaries in 2020 and 2022, as well as the film All of Tokyo! (2024), starring the fourth-generation members, with its sequel Zenbu of World set for release in February 2027.

== Bibliography ==
=== Books ===
==== Photo book ====
List of Hinatazaka46 group photobooks
Release	Title	Publisher	Notes	Ref(s)
28 August 2019	Tachikogi (立ち漕ぎ)	Shinchosha	First group photobook	
27 April 2021	Hinasatsu Vol. 01 (日向撮Vol.01)	Kodansha	Compilation of backstage photographs taken by the members	

==== Biography ====
List of Hinatazaka46 biographies
Release	Title	Publisher	Notes	Ref(s)
25 March 2020	Hinatazaka46 Story (日向坂46ストーリー)	Kodansha	Biography of the group	

==== Manga ====
List of manga co-written by multiple Hinatazaka46 members
Release	Title	Publisher	Notes	Source
March 2021	Gensaku Hinatazaka (げんさく ひなたざか; lit. 'Original Hinatazaka')	Shueisha	Three-story manga miniseries; story by Nao Kosaka, Hinano Kamimura, and Miho Watanabe; artwork by Aka Akasaka; serialized in Weekly Young Jump	

== See also ==
- List of Hinatazaka46 appearances
- List of Hinatazaka46 members
