= Boku Nanka =

- Type-A edition cover, featuring Nao Kosaka

Single by Hinatazaka46

from the album Myakuutsu Kanjō
- English title: Someone Like Me
- B-side: "Hikōkigumo ga Dekiru Riyū"; "Mō Konna ni Suki ni Narenai" (Type-A); "Gaufre to Kimi" (Type-B); "Mayonaka no Zange Taikai" (Type-C); "Koishita Sakana wa Sora o Tobu" (Type-D); "Shiranai Uchi ni Aisareteita" (Regular)
- Released: June 1, 2022
- Genre: J-pop
- Length: 4:29
- Label: Sony Music Entertainment Japan
- Producer: Yasushi Akimoto

Hinatazaka46 singles chronology
"Tteka" (2021)	"Boku Nanka" (2022)	"Tsuki to Hoshi ga Odoru Midnight" (2022)

Music video
- "Boku Nanka" on YouTube
- "Hikōkigumo ga Dekiru Riyū" on YouTube
- "Gaufre to Kimi" on YouTube
- "Mayonaka no Zange Taikai" on YouTube
- "Koishita Sakana wa Sora o Tobu" on YouTube

"Boku Nanka" (Japanese: 僕なんか; lit. 'Someone like me') is the seventh single by Japanese idol group Hinatazaka46. It was released on June 1, 2022, through Sony Music Entertainment Japan. The title track features Nao Kosaka as lead performer. It is the last single featuring Manamo Miyata and Miho Watanabe.

== Background ==
During the encore on the second day of "Hinatazaka46 3rd Anniversary Memorial Live in Tokyo Dome", they announced the release of the title song of their 7th single, and performed the same song as a surprise.

== Production and release ==
The single was released in five versions: Type-A, Type-B, Type-C, Type-D, and a regular edition. All versions except for the regular edition also includes a Blu-ray Disc containing music videos and bonus videos.

Nao Kosaka was appointed as center (lead performer) of the title track for the fifth time after the fourth single "Sonna Koto Nai yo" in 2020. During production, she had just recently returned from health leave and did not participate in the more intense dance scenes in the music video for "Koishita Sakana wa Sora o Tobu".

The single is the last one featuring Miho Watanabe, who would leave the group after promotions have concluded. She served as center for the second generation members' B-side song "Koishita Sakana wa Sora wo Tobu", (Note: 恋した魚は空を飛ぶ ("The Fish in Love Flies in the Sky")) and the music video for "Hikōkigumo ga Dekiru Riyū" (Note: 飛行機雲ができる理由 ("The Reason Contrails Appear")) is about the closing of a dormitory named "Hidamari", a reference to her 2019 photobook of the same title. "Mayonaka no Zange Taikai" (Note: 真夜中の懺悔大会 ("Midnight Confession Gathering")) by the first generation members features the first appearance of member Sarina Ushio as lead performer. "Mō Konna ni Suki ni Narenai" (Note: もうこんなに好きになれない ("I Can't Love This Much Anymore")) was performed by the three Hinatazaka46 members born in 2002 (Hiyori Hamagishi, Nao Kosaka, and Miku Kanemura) and was first revealed at the group's second anniversary concert in March 2021, a year before this single was released. "Shiranai Uchi ni Aisareteita" (Note: 知らないうちに愛されていた ("I Was Unknowingly Loved")) was performed by all members.

== Reception ==
"Boku Nanka" sold 478,000 copies in its release week according to Billboard Japan and placed first in both the weekly Oricon Singles and Billboard Japan Hot 100 charts.

Real Sound commented that the rock ballad sound of "Boku Nanka" reflects the growth of the group, especially after experiencing different lead performers in the previous two singles, while the melody represents Kosaka's "ephemeral, fragile radiance" as she returned from her hiatus. "Koishita Sakana wa Sora wo Tobu" was also said to fit Watanabe, who enjoys both rock music and defying conventions, and is reminiscent of the group's origins as the subgroup of Keyakizaka46, who were known for their "cool" songs; on the other hand, "Hikōkigumo ga Dekiru Riyū" with its retro-style music video represents "nostalgia" and the happy memories created by Watanabe and the other members over the years. "Gaufre to Kimi" (Note: ゴーフルと君 ("Gaufre and You")) by the third generation members, with its absence of an obvious lead performer, was said to emphasize the four youngest members' friendship and distinct personalities.

== Track listing ==
All lyrics written by Yasushi Akimoto.

=== Type-A ===
CD
No.	Title	Length
1.	"Boku Nanka" (僕なんか)	4:29
2.	"Hikōkigumo ga Dekiru Riyū" (飛行機雲ができる理由)	4:30
3.	"Mō Konna ni Suki ni Narenai" (もうこんなに好きになれない)	4:13
4.	"Boku Nanka" (off vocal ver.)	4:29
5.	"Hikōkigumo ga Dekiru Riyū" (off vocal ver.)	4:30
6.	"Mō Konna ni Suki ni Narenai" (off vocal ver.)	4:12
Total length:		26:23

Blu-ray
No.	Title	Length
1.	"Boku Nanka" (Music Video)	4:52
2.	"Hikōkigumo ga Dekiru Riyū" (Music Video)	4:48
3.	"Hinata's bus travel ～1st Generation edition～" (ひなたのバス旅 ～一期生編～)	50;43
Total length:		60:24

=== Type-B ===
CD
No.	Title	Length
1.	"Boku Nanka" (僕なんか)	4:29
2.	"Hikōkigumo ga Dekiru Riyū" (飛行機雲ができる理由)	4:30
3.	"Gaufre to Kimi" (ゴーフルと君)	3:18
4.	"Boku Nanka" (off vocal ver.)	4:29
5.	"Hikōkigumo ga Dekiru Riyū" (off vocal ver.)	4:30
6.	"Gaufre to Kimi" (off vocal ver.)	3:16
Total length:		24:32

Blu-ray
No.	Title	Length
1.	"Boku Nanka" (Music Video)	4:52
2.	"Gaufre to Kimi" (Music Video)	6:10
3.	"Hinata's bus travel ～2nd Generation edition～" (ひなたのバス旅 ～ニ期生編～)	47:22
Total length:		58:25

=== Type-C ===
CD
No.	Title	Length
1.	"Boku Nanka" (僕なんか)	4:29
2.	"Hikōkigumo ga Dekiru Riyū" (飛行機雲ができる理由)	4:30
3.	"Mayonaka no Zange Taikai" (真夜中の懺悔大会)	4:06
4.	"Boku Nanka" (off vocal ver.)	4:29
5.	"Hikōkigumo ga Dekiru Riyū" (off vocal ver.)	4:30
6.	"Mayonaka no Zange Taikai" (off vocal ver.)	4:05
Total length:		26:09

Blu-ray
No.	Title	Length
1.	"Boku Nanka" (Music Video)	4:52
2.	"Mayonaka no Zange Taikai" (Music Video)	4:31
3.	"Hinata's bus travel ～3rd Generation edition～" (ひなたのバス旅 ～三期生編～)	49:33
Total length:		58:57

=== Type-D ===
CD
No.	Title	Length
1.	"Boku Nanka" (僕なんか)	4:29
2.	"Hikōkigumo ga Dekiru Riyū" (飛行機雲ができる理由)	4:30
3.	"Koishita Sakana wa Sora o Tobu" (恋した魚は空を飛ぶ)	5:05
4.	"Boku Nanka" (off vocal ver.)	4:29
5.	"Hikōkigumo ga Dekiru Riyū" (off vocal ver.)	4:30
6.	"Koishita Sakana wa Sora o Tobu" (off vocal ver.)	5:04
Total length:		28:07

Blu-ray
No.	Title	Length
1.	"Boku Nanka" (Music Video)	4:52
2.	"Koishita Sakana wa Sora o Tobu" (Music Video)	5:27
3.	"Hinata's bus travel ～Strategy meeting edition～" (ひなたのバス旅 ～作戦会議編～)	20:45
4.	"Hinata's bus travel ～Bonus edition～" (ひなたのバス旅 ～おまけ編～)	22:46
Total length:		53:51

=== Regular edition ===
CD
No.	Title	Length
1.	"Boku Nanka" (僕なんか)	4:29
2.	"Hikōkigumo ga Dekiru Riyū" (飛行機雲ができる理由)	4:30
3.	"Shiranai Uchi ni Aisareteita" (知らないうちに愛されていた)	4:57
4.	"Boku Nanka" (off vocal ver.)	4:29
5.	"Hikōkigumo ga Dekiru Riyū" (off vocal ver.)	4:30
6.	"Shiranai Uchi ni Aisareteita" (off vocal ver.)	4:56
Total length:		27:51

== Personnel ==
=== "Boku Nanka" ===
Center: Nao Kosaka

- 1st row: Hinano Kamimura, Kumi Sasaki, Nao Kosaka, Mirei Sasaki, Miku Kanemura
- 2nd row: Hiyori Hamagishi, Mei Higashimura, Hina Kawata, Shiho Katō, Kyōko Saitō, Akari Nibu, Konoka Matsuda, Suzuka Tomita
- 3rd row: Sarina Ushio, Haruyo Yamaguchi, Mana Takase, Yūka Kageyama, Miho Watanabe, Ayaka Takamoto, Manamo Miyata, Marī Morimoto, Mikuni Takahashi

=== "Hikōkigumo ga Dekiru Riyū" ===
Center: Nao Kosaka

- 1st row: Hinano Kamimura, Kumi Sasaki, Nao Kosaka, Mirei Sasaki, Miku Kanemura
- 2nd row: Hiyori Hamagishi, Mei Higashimura, Hina Kawata, Shiho Katō, Kyōko Saitō, Akari Nibu, Konoka Matsuda, Suzuka Tomita
- 3rd row: Sarina Ushio, Haruyo Yamaguchi, Mana Takase, Yūka Kageyama, Miho Watanabe, Ayaka Takamoto, Manamo Miyata, Marī Morimoto, Mikuni Takahashi

=== "Mō Konna ni Suki ni Narenai" ===
Hiyori Hamagishi, Nao Kosaka, Miku Kanemura

=== "Gaufre to Kimi" ===
Marī Morimoto, Haruyo Yamaguchi, Hinano Kamimura, Mikuni Takahashi (3rd Generation Songs)

=== "Mayonaka no Zange Taikai" ===
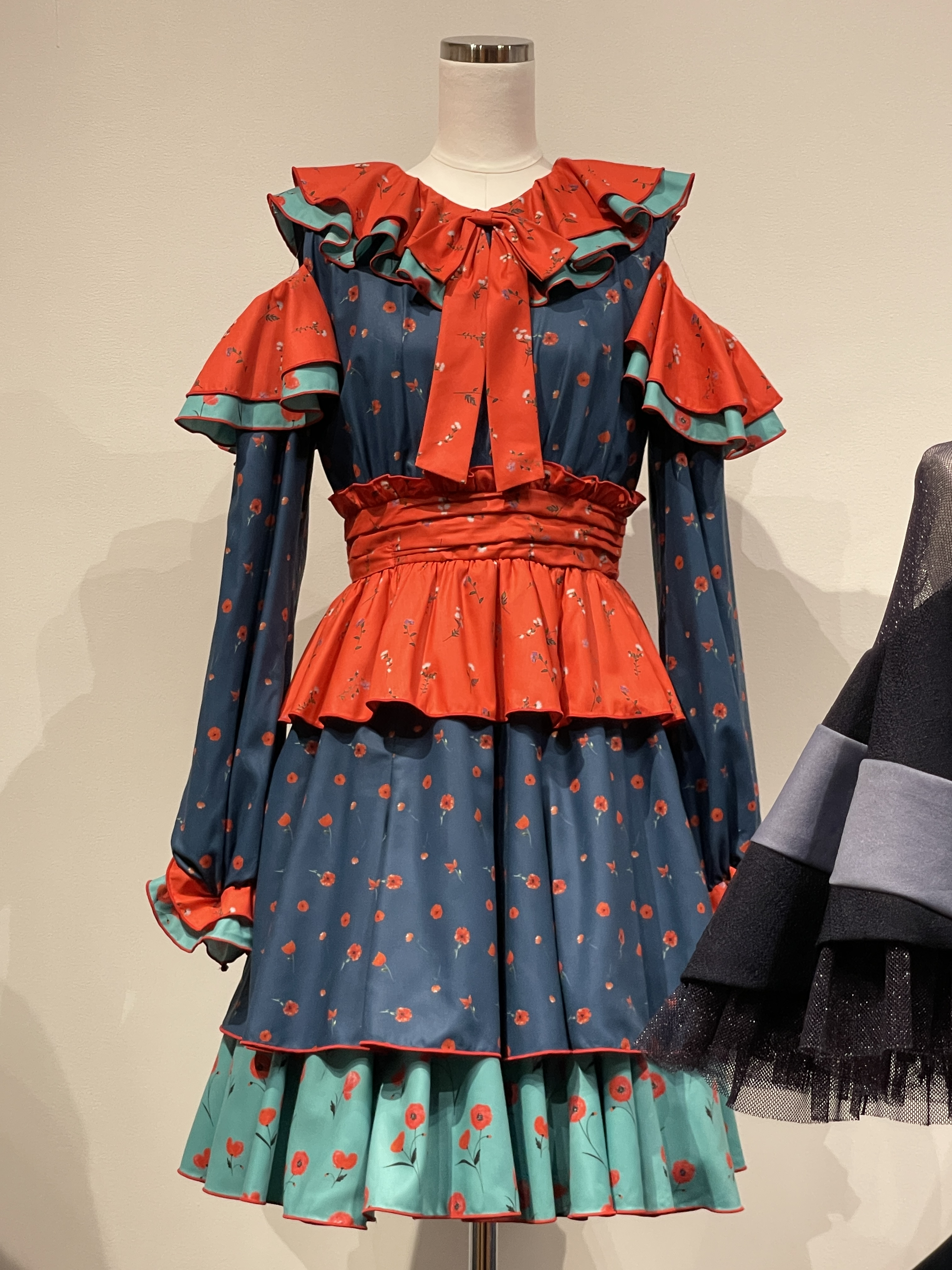
Costume for "Mayonaka no Zange Taikai"

Center: Sarina Ushio

- 1st row: Mana Takase, Sarina Ushio, Yūka Kageyama
- 2nd row: Mirei Sasaki, Mei Higashimura, Kyōko Saitō, Shiho Katō, Ayaka Takamoto (1st Generation Songs)

=== "Koishita Sakana wa Sora wo Tobu" ===
Center: Miho Watanabe

- 1st row: Miku Kanemura, Miho Watanabe, Nao Kosaka
- 2nd row: Suzuka Tomita, Hina Kawata, Konoka Matsuda, Akari Nibu, Manamo Miyata, Hiyori Hamagishi (2nd Generation Songs)

=== "Shiranai Uchi ni Aisareteita" ===
Center: Nao Kosaka

- 1st row: Hinano Kamimura, Kumi Sasaki, Nao Kosaka, Mirei Sasaki, Miku Kanemura
- 2nd row: Hiyori Hamagishi, Mei Higashimura, Hina Kawata, Shiho Katō, Kyōko Saitō, Akari Nibu, Konoka Matsuda, Suzuka Tomita
- 3rd row: Sarina Ushio, Haruyo Yamaguchi, Mana Takase, Yūka Kageyama, Miho Watanabe, Ayaka Takamoto, Manamo Miyata, Marī Morimoto, Mikuni Takahashi

== Charts ==
=== Weekly charts ===
Weekly chart performance for "Boku Nanka"
Chart (2022)	Peak position
Japan (Japan Hot 100)	1
Japan (Oricon)	1

=== Monthly charts ===
Monthly chart performance for "Boku Nanka"
Chart (2022)	Peak position
Japan (Oricon)	2

=== Year-end charts ===
Year-end chart performance for "Boku Nanka"
Chart (2022)	Position
Japan (Oricon)	15
Japan Top Singles Sales (Billboard Japan)	17

== Certifications ==
Sales certifications for "Boku Nanka"
Region	Certification	Certified units/sales
Japan (RIAJ)	2× Platinum	500,000^{^}
^{^} Shipments figures based on certification alone.
