= Hinatazaka (album) =

- Regular edition cover

Studio album by Hinatazaka46
- Released: September 23, 2020
- Genre: J-pop
- Length: 137:53 (Type-A); 146:07 (Type-B); 66:22 (regular); 120:13 (complete)
- Label: Sony Music
- Producer: Yasushi Akimoto

Hinatazaka46 chronology
Hashiridasu Shunkan (2018)	Hinatazaka (2020)	Myakuutsu Kanjō (2023)

Singles from Hinatazaka
- 1. "Kyun" Released: March 27, 2019; 2. "Do Re Mi Sol La Si Do" Released: July 17, 2019; 3. "Konna ni Suki ni Natchatte Ii no?" Released: October 2, 2019; 4. "Sonna Koto Nai yo" Released: February 19, 2020

Music video
- "Azato Kawaii" on YouTube

Hinatazaka (Japanese: ひなたざか) is the first studio album by Japanese idol group Hinatazaka46. It was released on September 23, 2020. This album is the group's second album overall and the first one released under the name Hinatazaka46.

== History and release ==
During a live streamed concert on July 31, 2020, Hinatazaka46 announced that they will be releasing a new album. The album's name, Hinatazaka, was announced on August 18; the name is the group's name written in hiragana.

The album was released in three versions: Type-A, Type-B, and Regular. The first two are bundled with a Blu-ray disk containing the music video of promotional track, "Azato Kawaii" (アザトカワイイ), and footage from Hinatazaka46's concerts.

== Track listing ==
All lyrics are written by Yasushi Akimoto, except "Overture".

=== Type-A ===
CD
No.	Title	Music	Arrangement	Length
1.	"Overture"	TomoLow		1:39
2.	"Azato Kawaii" (アザトカワイイ)	Kenta Urashima; NIYA; TETTA	TETTA	3:56
3.	"Seishun no Uma" (青春の馬)	Keiichi Kondo	Kondo	5:04
4.	"Do Re Mi Sol La Si Do" (ドレミソラシド)	Yoichiro Nomura	Nomura	5:03
5.	"Kono Natsu o Jam ni Shiyō" (この夏をジャムにしよう)	Pakorama	Pakorama	4:22
6.	"Kitsune" (キツネ)	Yuichi Harada	Harada	3:38
7.	"Sonna Koto Nai yo" (ソンナコトナイヨ)	Hideki Yanagisawa	Yanagisawa	4:44
8.	"Konna ni Suki ni Natchatte Ii no?" (こんなに好きになっちゃっていいの?)	Junya Maesako; 7th Avenue	7th Avenue	5:17
9.	"Kyun" (キュン)	Nomura	Nomura	4:58
10.	"Honto no Jikan" (ホントの時間)	Nomura	Nomura	5:01
11.	"My God"	Doubleglass	Doubleglass	4:08
12.	"Dash&Rush"	Dai Odagiri	Hiroshi Sasaki	4:11
13.	"Dare yori mo Takaku Tobe! 2020" (誰よりも高く跳べ! 2020)	Kamikaoru; Doubleglass	Yūichi "Masa" Nonaka	4:41
14.	"Hinatazaka" (日向坂)	Yutaka Shinya	Shinya	4:00
15.	"Joyful Love"	Maesako; Dr.Lilcom	Dr.Lilcom	4:33
Total length:				65:15

Blu-ray
No.	Title	Length
1.	"Azato Kawaii" (music video)	4:51
2.	"Hinatazaka46 Debut Countdown Live!! in Yokohama Arena: Hiragana Keyakizaka46 Last Live" (日向坂46デビューカウントダウンライブ!! in 横浜アリーナ〜けやき坂46 LAST LIVE〜)	67:47
Total length:		72:38

=== Type-B ===
CD
No.	Title	Music	Arrangement	Length
1.	"Overture"	TomoLow		1:39
2.	"Do Re Mi Sol La Si Do"	Nomura	Nomura	5:03
3.	"Nazē" (ナゼー)	Masahiro Koyama	Koyama	4:12
4.	"No War in the Future 2020"	Tadashi Tsukida	Tsukida	4:32
5.	"Tada Gamushara ni" (ただがむしゃらに)	Yasuyuki Kojō	Kojō	3:53
6.	"Azato Kawaii"	Urashima; NIYA; TETTA	TETTA	3:56
7.	"Cage"	Tsuru Yuichirō	Yuichirō	4:36
8.	"Dōshite Ame da to Ittan Darō?" (どうして雨だと言ったんだろう?)	Katsuhiko Sugiyama	Sugiyama; Tsuyoshi Ishihara; Tatsurō Ariki	5:13
9.	"Kawa wa Nagareru" (川は流れる)	Ryōta Nakano	Nakano	4:40
10.	"Konna ni Suki ni Natchatte Ii no?"	Maesako; 7th Avenue	7th Avenue	5:17
11.	"Kyun"	Nomura	Nomura	4:58
12.	"Sonna Koto Nai yo"	Yanagisawa	Yanagisawa	4:44
13.	"Kitsune"	Harada	Harada	3:38
14.	"Seishun no Uma"	Kondo	Kondo	5:04
15.	"Joyful Love"	Maesako; Dr.Lilcom	Dr.Lilcom	4:33
Total length:				65:58

Blu-ray
No.	Title	Length
1.	"Azato Kawaii" (music video)	4:51
2.	"Hinatazaka46 Debut Countdown Live!! in Yokohama Arena: Hinatazaka446 First Live" (日向坂46デビューカウントダウンライブ!! in 横浜アリーナ〜日向坂46 FIRST LIVE〜)	75:18
Total length:		80:09

=== Regular edition ===
CD
No.	Title	Music	Arrangement	Length
1.	"Overture"	TomoLow		1:39
2.	"Kyun"	Nomura	Nomura	4:58
3.	"Do Re Mi Sol La Si Do"	Nomura	Nomura	5:03
4.	"Konna ni Suki ni Natchatte Ii no?"	Maesako; 7th Avenue	7th Avenue	5:17
5.	"Sonna Koto Nai yo"	Yanagisawa	Yanagisawa	4:44
6.	"Joyful Love"	Maesako; Dr.Lilcom	Dr.Lilcom	4:33
7.	"Tokimeki Sō" (ときめき草)	Ryōma Mikoshiba	Mikoshiba	4:15
8.	"Footsteps"	Yoji Noi	Noi	4:54
9.	"Kitsune"	Harada	Harada	3:38
10.	"Masaka Gūzen…" (まさか 偶然…)	Furuppe	Furuppe	5:02
11.	"Seishun no Uma"	Kondo	Kondo	5:04
12.	"Azato Kawaii"	Urashima; NIYA; TETTA	TETTA	3:56
13.	"My Fans"	Hiroki Muramasa	Muramasa	3:57
14.	"See Through"	Sasaki	Sasaki	4:21
15.	"Yakusoku no Tamago 2020" (約束の卵 2020)	Aokado	Aokado	5:03
Total length:				66:22

=== Complete edition ===
Credits adapted from Apple Music.

Digital download, streaming
No.	Title	Music	Arrangement	Length
1.	"Overture"	TomoLow		1:41
2.	"Kyun"	Nomura	Nomura	5:00
3.	"Do Re Mi Sol La Si Do"	Nomura	Nomura	5:05
4.	"Konna ni Suki ni Natchatte Ii no?"	Maesako; 7th Avenue	7th Avenue	5:19
5.	"Sonna Koto Nai yo"	Yanagisawa	Yanagisawa	4:45
6.	"Joyful Love"	Maesako; Dr.Lilcom	Dr.Lilcom	4:35
7.	"Kitsune"	Harada	Harada	3:40
8.	"Seishun no Uma"	Kondo	Kondo	5:06
9.	"Azato Kawaii"	Urashima; NIYA; TETTA	TETTA	3:58
10.	"Kono Natsu o Jam ni Shiyō"	Pakorama	Pakorama	4:22
11.	"Honto no Jikan"	Nomura	Nomura	5:01
12.	"My God"	Doubleglass	Doubleglass	4:08
13.	"Dash&Rush"	Odagiri	Sasaki	4:11
14.	"Dare yori mo Takaku Tobe! 2020"	Kamikaoru; Doubleglass	Masa	4:41
15.	"Hinatazaka"	Shinya	Shinya	4:00
16.	"Nazē"	Koyama	Koyama	4:12
17.	"No War in the Future 2020"	Tsukida	Tsukida	4:32
18.	"Tada Gamushara ni"	Kojō	Kojō	3:53
19.	"Cage"	Yuichirō	Yuichirō	4:36
20.	"Dōshite Ame da to Ittan Darō?"	Sugiyama	Sugiyama; Ishihara; Ariki	5:13
21.	"Kawa wa Nagareru"	Nakano	Nakano	4:40
22.	"Tokimeki Sō"	Mikoshiba	Mikoshiba	4:15
23.	"Footsteps"	Noi	Noi	4:54
24.	"Masaka Gūzen…"	Furuppe	Furuppe	5:02
25.	"My Fans"	Muramasa	Muramasa	3:57
26.	"See Through"	Sasaki	Sasaki	4:21
27.	"Yakusoku no Tamago 2020"	Aokado	Aokado	5:03
Total length:				120:13

== Participating members ==
=== "Azato Kawaii" ===
Center: Mirei Sasaki

- 1st row: Kyōko Saitō, Shiho Katō, Mirei Sasaki, Nao Kosaka, Miku Kanemura
- 2nd row: Suzuka Tomita, Konoka Matsuda, Hina Kawata, Akari Nibu, Miho Watanabe, Hinano Kamimura, Mei Higashimura, Sarina Ushio
- 3rd row: Yūka Kageyama, Mana Takase, Haruyo Yamaguchi, Ayaka Takamoto, Kumi Sasaki, Manamo Miyata, Marī Morimoto, Hiyori Hamagishi, Mikuni Takahashi

=== "Kono Natsu o Jam ni Shiyō" ===
- Hinano Kamimura, Mikuni Takahashi, Marī Morimoto, Haruyo Yamaguchi（3rd Generation Songs）

=== "Dare yori mo Takaku Tobe! 2020" ===
- Sarina Ushio, Yūka Kageyama, Shiho Katō, Kyōko Saitō, Kumi Sasaki, Mirei Sasaki, Mana Takase, Ayaka Takamoto, Mei Higashimura, Miku Kanemura, Hina Kawata, Nao Kosaka, Suzuka Tomita, Akari Nibu, Hiyori Hamagishi, Konoka Matsuda, Manamo Miyata, Miho Watanabe, Hinano Kamimura, Mikuni Takahashi, Marī Morimoto, Haruyo Yamaguchi

=== "Hinatazaka" ===
- Mao Iguchi, Sarina Ushio, Memi Kakizaki, Shiho Katō, Kyōko Saitō, Kumi Sasaki, Mirei Sasaki, Mana Takase, Ayaka Takamoto, Mei Higashimura, Miku Kanemura, Hina Kawata, Nao Kosaka, Suzuka Tomita, Akari Nibu, Hiyori Hamagishi, Konoka Matsuda, Manamo Miyata, Miho Watanabe, Hinano Kamimura

=== "NO WAR in the future 2020" ===
- Sarina Ushio, Yūka Kageyama, Shiho Katō, Kyōko Saitō, Kumi Sasaki, Mirei Sasaki, Mana Takase, Ayaka Takamoto, Mei Higashimura, Miku Kanemura, Hina Kawata, Nao Kosaka, Suzuka Tomita, Akari Nibu, Hiyori Hamagishi, Konoka Matsuda, Manamo Miyata, Miho Watanabe, Hinano Kamimura, Mikuni Takahashi, Marī Morimoto, Haruyo Yamaguchi

=== "Tada Gamushara ni" ===
- Sarina Ushio, Yūka Kageyama, Shiho Katō, Kyōko Saitō, Kumi Sasaki, Mirei Sasaki, Mana Takase, Ayaka Takamoto, Mei Higashimura, Miku Kanemura, Hina Kawata, Nao Kosaka, Suzuka Tomita, Akari Nibu, Hiyori Hamagishi, Konoka Matsuda, Manamo Miyata, Miho Watanabe, Hinano Kamimura, Mikuni Takahashi, Marī Morimoto, Haruyo Yamaguchi

=== "Dōshite Ame da to Ittan Darō?" ===
- Shiho Katō, Kyōko Saitō, Mirei Sasaki

=== "My Fans" ===
- Sarina Ushio, Yūka Kageyama, Shiho Katō, Kyōko Saitō, Kumi Sasaki, Mirei Sasaki, Mana Takase, Ayaka Takamoto, Mei Higashimura, Miku Kanemura, Hina Kawata, Nao Kosaka, Suzuka Tomita, Akari Nibu, Hiyori Hamagishi, Konoka Matsuda, Manamo Miyata, Miho Watanabe, Hinano Kamimura, Mikuni Takahashi, Marī Morimoto, Haruyo Yamaguchi

=== "See Through" ===
- Miku Kanemura, Nao Kosaka

=== "Yakusoku no Tamago 2020" ===
- Sarina Ushio, Yūka Kageyama, Shiho Katō, Kyōko Saitō, Kumi Sasaki, Mirei Sasaki, Mana Takase, Ayaka Takamoto, Mei Higashimura, Miku Kanemura, Hina Kawata, Nao Kosaka, Suzuka Tomita, Akari Nibu, Hiyori Hamagishi, Konoka Matsuda, Manamo Miyata, Miho Watanabe, Hinano Kamimura, Mikuni Takahashi, Marī Morimoto, Haruyo Yamaguchi

== Charts ==
=== Weekly charts ===
Chart (2020)	Peak position	First week sales
Japan Hot Albums (Billboard)	1	171,526
Japanese Albums (Oricon)	1	208,604

=== Year-end charts ===
Chart (2020)	Position
Japan Hot Albums (Billboard)	12
Japanese Albums (Oricon)	11

== Certifications ==
Certifications for Hinatazaka
Region	Certification	Certified units/sales
Japan (RIAJ)	Platinum	250,000^{^}
^{^} Shipments figures based on certification alone.
