= Hashiridasu Shunkan =

2018 album by Hiragana Keyakizaka46

- Type A cover

Studio album by Hiragana Keyakizaka46
- Released: June 20, 2018 (Japan)
- Genre: J-pop
- Length: Type-A: 75:45; Type-B: 76:35; Regular: 70:21
- Label: Sony Music Entertainment Japan
- Producer: Yasushi Akimoto

Hiragana Keyakizaka46 chronology
Hashiridasu Shunkan (2018)	Hinatazaka (2020)

Music video
- "Kitaishite Inai Jibun" on YouTube

Hashiridasu Shunkan (走り出す瞬間; The moment to start running) is the first album by Japanese idol girl group Hiragana Keyakizaka46. It was released on 20 June 2018. The album reached the top position on the weekly Oricon Albums Chart. It also reached number one on the Billboard Japan Hot Albums Chart.

== Track listing ==
All lyrics written by Yasushi Akimoto.

=== DISC 1 (Type-A) ===
CD
No.	Title	Length
1.	"Hiragana Keyaki" (ひらがなけやき)	3:43
2.	"Dare yori mo Takaku Tobe!" (誰よりも高く跳べ!)	4:43
3.	"Bokutachi wa Tsukiatteiru" (僕たちは付き合っている)	4:38
4.	"W-KEYAKIZAKA no Uta" (W-KEYAKIZAKAの詩)	5:08
5.	"Eien no Hakusen" (永遠の白線)	4:20
6.	"Chinmokushita Koibito yo" (沈黙した恋人よ)	4:39
7.	"Soredemo Aruiteru" (それでも歩いてる)	4:11
8.	"NO WAR in the Future"	4:34
9.	"Ima ni Mite Iro" (イマニミテイロ)	4:36
10.	"Hanbun no Kioku" (半分の記憶)	4:59
11.	"Kitaishiteinai Jibun" (期待していない自分)	3:28
12.	"Senkōhanabi ga Kieru made" (線香花火が消えるまで)	4:37
13.	"Mijyuku na Ikari" (未熟な怒り)	3:32
14.	"Wazukana Hikari" (わずかな光)	4:49
15.	"Knock o Suruna!" (ノックをするな!)	3:54
16.	"Halloween no Kabocha ga Wareta" (ハロウィンのカボチャが割れた)	4:51
17.	"Yakusoku no Tamago" (約束の卵)	5:03
Total length:		75:45

=== DISC 2 (Type-A) ===
Blu-ray
No.	Title	Length
1.	"Kitaishite Inai Jibun" (music video)	3:42
2.	"Overture" (ひらがな武道館〜Day3 Special Selection〜)	1:36
3.	"Opening" (ひらがな武道館〜Day3 Special Selection〜)	2:00
4.	"Hiragana Keyaki" (ひらがな武道館〜Day3 Special Selection〜)	3:57
5.	"Futari Saison" (ひらがな武道館〜Day3 Special Selection〜)	4:50
6.	"Bokutachi ha Tsukiatteiru" (ひらがな武道館〜Day3 Special Selection〜)	4:58
7.	"Chinmoku shi ta Koibito Yo" (ひらがな武道館〜Day3 Special Selection〜)	4:41
8.	"100nen Mateba" (ひらがな武道館〜Day3 Special Selection〜)	4:41
9.	"Dance Track" (ひらがな武道館〜Day3 Special Selection〜)	2:11
10.	"Seifuku no Mannequin" (ひらがな武道館〜Day3 Special Selection〜)	4:34
11.	"Eien no Hakusen" (ひらがな武道館〜Day3 Special Selection〜)	4:20
12.	"Dare yori mo Takaku Tobe!" (ひらがな武道館〜Day3 Special Selection〜)	6:35
13.	"Ima ni Mite Iro" (ひらがな武道館〜Day3 Special Selection〜)	4:41
14.	"MC" (ひらがな武道館〜Day3 Special Selection〜)	7:15
15.	"Dare yori mo Takaku Tobe!【Double encore】" (ひらがな武道館〜Day3 Special Selection〜)	6:14
16.	"Credit title" (ひらがな武道館〜Day3 Special Selection〜)	4:57
Total length:		71:12

=== DISC 1 (Type-B) ===
CD
No.	Title	Length
1.	"Hiragana Keyaki" (ひらがなけやき)	3:43
2.	"Dare yori mo Takaku Tobe!" (誰よりも高く跳べ!)	4:43
3.	"Bokutachi wa Tsukiatteiru" (僕たちは付き合っている)	4:38
4.	"W-KEYAKIZAKA no Uta" (W-KEYAKIZAKAの詩)	5:08
5.	"Eien no Hakusen" (永遠の白線)	4:20
6.	"Chinmokushita Koibito yo" (沈黙した恋人よ)	4:39
7.	"Soredemo Aruiteru" (それでも歩いてる)	4:11
8.	"NO WAR in the Future"	4:34
9.	"Ima ni Mite Iro" (イマニミテイロ)	4:36
10.	"Hanbun no Kioku" (半分の記憶)	4:59
11.	"Kitaishite Inai Jibun" (期待していない自分)	3:28
12.	"Kirei ni Naritai" (キレイになりたい)	4:17
13.	"Natsuiro no Mule" (夏色のミュール)	4:43
14.	"Otoko Tomodachi dakara" (男友達だから)	5:04
15.	"Saizenretsu e" (最前列へ)	4:49
16.	"Oide Natsu no Kyōkaisen" (おいで夏の境界線)	4:06
17.	"Sharin ga Kishimu yōni Kimi ga Naku" (車輪が軋むように君が泣く)	4:37
Total length:		76:35

=== DISC 2 (Type-B) ===
Blu-ray
No.	Title	Length
1.	"Kitaishite Inai Jibun" (music video)	3:42
2.	"Zepp Tokyo" (ひらがな全国ツアー2017 Live & Documentary)	5:49
3.	"Zepp Namba（OSAKA）" (ひらがな全国ツアー2017 Live & Documentary)	3:31
4.	"Zepp Nagoya" (ひらがな全国ツアー2017 Live & Documentary)	2:58
5.	"Zepp Sapporo" (ひらがな全国ツアー2017 Live & Documentary)	3:27
6.	"福岡サンパレス" (ひらがな全国ツアー2017 Live & Documentary)	3:29
7.	"Overture / 幕張メッセ イベントホール" (ひらがな全国ツアー2017 Live & Documentary)	2:00
8.	"Hiragana Keyaki / 幕張メッセ イベントホール" (ひらがな全国ツアー2017 Live & Documentary)	3:43
9.	"MC / 幕張メッセ イベントホール" (ひらがな全国ツアー2017 Live & Documentary)	1:07
10.	"NO WAR in the Future / 幕張メッセ イベントホール" (ひらがな全国ツアー2017 Live & Documentary)	4:51
11.	"Soredemo Aruiteru / 幕張メッセ イベントホール" (ひらがな全国ツアー2017 Live & Documentary)	4:12
12.	"Te wo Tsunaide Kaerōka / 幕張メッセ イベントホール" (ひらがな全国ツアー2017 Live & Documentary)	5:39
13.	"Taiyō wa Miageru Hito o Erabanai / 幕張メッセ イベントホール" (ひらがな全国ツアー2017 Live & Documentary)	6:43
14.	"Bokutachi wa Tsukiatteiru / 幕張メッセ イベントホール" (ひらがな全国ツアー2017 Live & Documentary)	4:51
15.	"MC / 幕張メッセ イベントホール" (ひらがな全国ツアー2017 Live & Documentary)	7:11
16.	"W-KEYAKIZAKA no Uta / 幕張メッセ イベントホール" (ひらがな全国ツアー2017 Live & Documentary)	7:49
Total length:		71:02

=== Regular edition ===
CD
No.	Title	Length
1.	"Hiragana Keyaki" (ひらがなけやき)	3:43
2.	"Dare yori mo Takaku Tobe!" (誰よりも高く跳べ!)	4:43
3.	"Bokutachi wa Tsukiatteiru" (僕たちは付き合っている)	4:38
4.	"W-KEYAKIZAKA no Uta" (W-KEYAKIZAKAの詩)	5:08
5.	"Eien no Hakusen" (永遠の白線)	4:20
6.	"Chinmokushita Koibito yo" (沈黙した恋人よ)	4:39
7.	"Soredemo Aruiteru" (それでも歩いてる)	4:11
8.	"NO WAR in the Future"	4:34
9.	"Ima ni Mite Iro" (イマニミテイロ)	4:36
10.	"Hanbun no Kioku" (半分の記憶)	4:59
11.	"Kitaishite Inai Jibun" (期待していない自分)	3:28
12.	"Sanrinsha ni Noritai" (三輪車に乗りたい)	4:24
13.	"Konna Seiretsu o Dare ga Saseru noka?" (こんな整列を誰がさせるのか?)	4:43
14.	"Igokochi Waruku Otona ni natta" (居心地悪く、大人になった)	3:56
15.	"Warenai Shabondama" (割れないシャボン玉)	4:08
16.	"Hiragana de Koishitai" (ひらがなで恋したい)	4:11
Total length:		70:21

== Charts ==
Chart (2018)	Peak position
Japan (Billboard Japan Hot Albums)	1
Japan (Oricon Albums Chart)	1
