= Am I Ready? =

- Regular edition cover

Single by Hinatazaka46

from the album Myakuutsu Kanjō
- B-side: "Mita koto Nai Mamono"; "Sesshoku to Kanjо̄"; "Honegumi-darake no Natsuyasumi"; "Kimi wa Sakadachi Dekiru ka?"; "Ai no Hikikomori"; "Glass Mado ga Yogoreteru"
- Released: July 26, 2023
- Genre: J-pop
- Label: Sony Music Entertainment Japan
- Lyricist: Yasushi Akimoto
- Producer: Yasushi Akimoto

Hinatazaka46 singles chronology
| "One Choice" (2023) | "Am I Ready?" (2023) | "Kimi wa Honeydew" (2024) |

Music video
- "Am I Ready?" on YouTube
- "Mita koto Nai Mamono" on YouTube
- "Glass Mado ga Yogoreteru" on YouTube

"Am I Ready?" is the tenth single by Japanese girl group Hinatazaka46, released on July 26, 2023 by Sony Music Entertainment Japan. It features the first appearance of Hinano Kamimura as the lead performer of a title song, and is the first single released after the departure of Yūka Kageyama. The single debuted atop the weekly Oricon Singles Chart with over 448,000 sales.

== Production and release ==
The music video for "Am I Ready?" was released on July 3, 2023. It depicts the "world within the mind" of a teenage girl in love, and was inspired by the imageries of summertime, as well as Kamimura's personal interests.

== Critical reception ==
The "Am I Ready?" music video won the Best Cinematography award at the MTV Video Music Awards Japan 2023.

== Commercial performance ==
"Am I Ready?" sold 522,533 copies in its release week and topped the Billboard Japan Top Singles Sales chart.

== Track listing ==
1. "Am I Ready?"
2. "Mita koto Nai Mamono" (Note: 見たことない魔物; lit. 'Never-before-seen Monster')
3. Different tracks on each edition:
  - Type-A: "Sesshoku to Kanjо̄" (Note: 接触と感情; lit. 'Touch and Feelings')
  - Type-B: "Honegumi-darake no Natsuyasumi" (Note: 骨組みだらけの夏休み; lit. 'Summer Holiday Full of Skeletons')
  - Type-C: "Kimi wa Sakadachi Dekiru ka?" (Note: 君は逆立ちできるか？; lit. 'Can You Do a Handstand?')
  - Type-D: "Ai no Hikikomori" (Note: 愛のひきこもり; lit. 'Recluse of Love')
  - Regular: "Glass Mado ga Yogoreteru" (Note: ガラス窓が汚れてる; lit. 'The Glass Windows Are Dirty')
4. Am I ready? (off vocal ver.)
5. Off-vocal versions of track 3

== Personnel ==
Obtained from official website.

=== "Am I Ready?" ===
Center: Hinano Kamimura

- 1st row: Hina Kawata, Akari Nibu, Hinano Kamimura, Konoka Matsuda, Miku Kanemura
- 2nd row: Kumi Sasaki, Kyōko Saitō, Nao Kosaka, Mirei Sasaki, Shiho Katō, Mei Higashimura
- 3rd row: Mikuni Takahashi, Mana Takase, Marie Morimoto, Sarina Ushio, Ayaka Takamoto, Haruyo Yamaguchi, Hiyori Hamagishi, Suzuka Tomita

=== "Mita Koto Nai Mamono" ===
All 4th Generation members

Center: Kaho Fujishima

- 1st row: Sumire Miyachi, Kaho Fujishima, Yoko Shogenji
- 2nd row: Rio Shimizu, Haruka Yamashita, Nanami Konishi, Rina Watanabe
- 3rd row: Mitsuki Hiraoka, Honoka Kishi, Kirari Takeuchi, Tamaki Ishizuka, Honoka Hirao

=== "Glass Mado ga Yogoreteru" ===
Center: Hina Kawata

- 1st row: Hinano Kamimura, Akari Nibu, Hina Kawata, Konoka Matsuda, Miku Kanemura
- 2nd row: Kumi Sasaki, Kyōko Saitō, Nao Kosaka, Mirei Sasaki, Shiho Katō, Mei Higashimura
- 3rd row: Mikuni Takahashi, Mana Takase, Marie Morimoto, Sarina Ushio, Ayaka Takamoto, Haruyo Yamaguchi, Hiyori Hamagishi, Suzuka Tomita

=== "Sesshoku to Kanjō" ===
Same as "Am I Ready?"

=== "Honegumi-darake no Natsuyasumi" ===
All 1st Generation members

Center: Mana Takase

- 1st row: Sarina Ushio, Mana Takase, Kumi Sasaki
- 2nd row: Kyōko Saitō, Ayaka Takamoto, Mirei Sasaki, Mei Higashimura, Shiho Katō

=== "Kimi wa Sakadachi Dekiru ka?" ===
All 2nd Generation members

Center: Suzuka Tomita

- 1st row: Hiyori Hamagishi, Suzuka Tomita, Konoka Matsuda
- 2nd row: Miku Kanemura, Akari Nibu, Nao Kosaka, Hina Kawata

=== "Ai no Hikikomori" ===
All 3rd Generation members

Center: Mikuni Takahashi

- 1st row: Mikuni Takahashi
- 2nd row: Marie Morimoto, Hinano Kamimura
- 3rd row: Haruyo Yamaguchi

== Charts ==
=== Weekly charts ===
Weekly chart performance for "Am I Ready?"
| Chart (2023) | Peak position |
|---|---|
| Japan (Japan Hot 100) | 4 |
| Japan (Oricon) | 1 |
| Japan Combined Singles (Oricon) | 1 |
| Japanese Combined Albums (Oricon) | 27 |

=== Monthly charts ===
Monthly chart performance for "Am I Ready?"
| Chart (2023) | Position |
|---|---|
| Japan (Oricon) | 2 |

=== Year-end charts ===
Year-end chart performance for "Am I Ready?"
| Chart (2023) | Position |
|---|---|
| Japan (Oricon) | 14 |
| Japan Top Singles Sales (Billboard Japan) | 14 |

== Certifications ==
Certifications for "Am I Ready?"
| Region | Certification | Certified units/sales |
|---|---|---|
| Japan (RIAJ) | 2× Platinum | 500,000^{^} |
^{^} Shipments figures based on certification alone.
