= Kyun (song) =

2019 single by Hinatazaka46

- Regular edition cover

Single by Hinatazaka46

from the album Hinatazaka
- B-side: "Joyful Love"; "Mimi ni Ochiru Namida" (Type-A); "Footsteps" (Type-B); "Tokimeki Sō" (Type-C); "Chinmoku ga Ai Nara" (Regular)
- Released: March 27, 2019
- Genre: J-pop
- Length: 5:00
- Label: Sony Music Entertainment Japan
- Composer: Nomura
- Lyricist: Yasushi Akimoto
- Producer: Yasushi Akimoto

Hinatazaka46 singles chronology
"Kyun" (2019)	"Do Re Mi Sol La Si Do" (2019)

Music video
- "Kyun" on YouTube
- "Joyful Love" on YouTube
- "Tokimeki Sō" on YouTube

"Kyun" (Japanese: キュン) is the debut single from Japanese idol group Hinatazaka46. It was released on March 27, 2019, through Sony Music Entertainment Japan. The title track features Nao Kosaka as center. The single was announced on February 11, 2019 on a Showroom livestream. The music video for the title track, "Kyun", was released on YouTube and Hinatazaka46's official website on March 5, 2019. The video was shot at a school and features a scene of around 100 people dancing on the school's outdoor field. It debuted at number one on the Oricon Singles Chart with over 476,000 copies sold.

== Release ==
This single was released in 4 versions. Type-A, Type-B, Type-C and a regular edition.

== Track listing ==
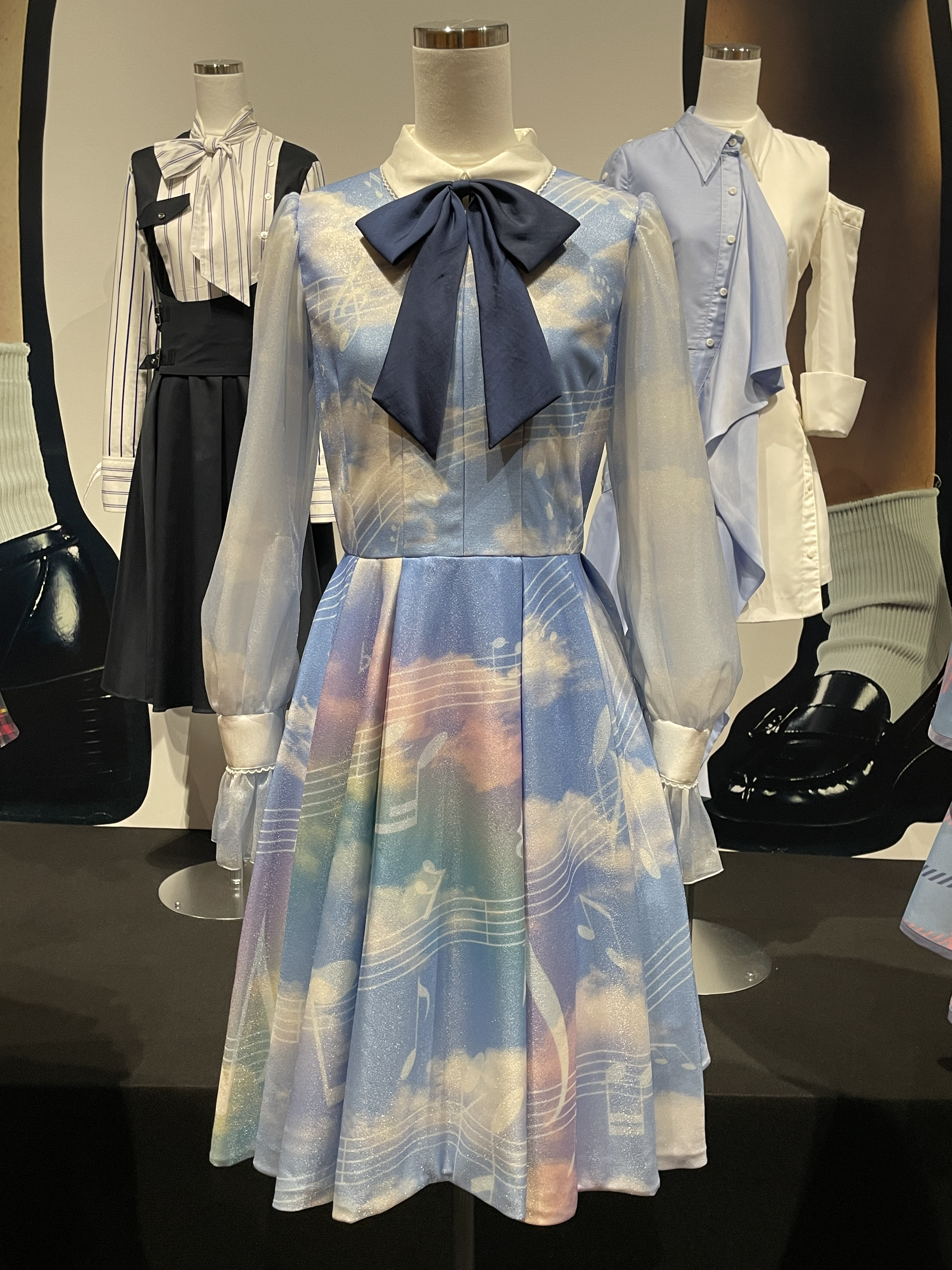
A costume for live performances

All lyrics written by Yasushi Akimoto.

=== Type-A ===
CD
No.	Title	Length
1.	"Kyun" (キュン)	5:00
2.	"Joyful Love"	4:35
3.	"Mimi ni Ochiru Namida" (耳に落ちる涙)	4:34
4.	"Kyun" (off vocal ver.)	5:00
5.	"Joyful Love" (off vocal ver.)	4:35
6.	"Mimi ni Ochiru Namida" (off vocal ver.)	4:33
Total length:		28:27

Blu-ray
No.	Title	Length
1.	"Kyun" (music video)	5:10
2.	"Joyful Love" (music video)	4:43
3.	"Mao Iguchi: Hiragana Keyakizaka46 ~Towards Where the Sun Shines~"	7:06
4.	"Memi Kakizaki: Hiragana Keyakizaka46 ~Towards Where the Sun Shines~"	6:23
5.	"Mirei Sasaki: Hiragana Keyakizaka46 ~Towards Where the Sun Shines~"	6:42
6.	"Mana Takase: Hiragana Keyakizaka46 ~Towards Where the Sun Shines~"	6:15
7.	"Hina Kawata: Hiragana Keyakizaka46 ~Towards Where the Sun Shines~"	6:00
8.	"Nao Kosaka: Hiragana Keyakizaka46 ~Towards Where the Sun Shines~"	8:20
9.	"Konoka Matsuda: Hiragana Keyakizaka46 ~Towards Where the Sun Shines~"	7:21
Total length:		58:00

=== Type-B ===
CD
No.	Title	Length
1.	"Kyun"	5:00
2.	"Joyful Love"	4:35
3.	"Footsteps"	4:54
4.	"Kyun" (off vocal ver.)	5:00
5.	"Joyful Love" (off vocal ver.)	4:35
6.	"Footsteps" (off vocal ver.)	4:53
Total length:		28:57

Blu-ray
No.	Title	Length
1.	"Kyun" (music video)	5:10
2.	"Footsteps" (music video)	5:17
3.	"Sarina Ushio: Hiragana Keyakizaka46 ~Towards Where the Sun Shines~"	7:03
4.	"Kyōko Saitō: Hiragana Keyakizaka46 ~Towards Where the Sun Shines~"	6:41
5.	"Miku Kanemura: Hiragana Keyakizaka46 ~Towards Where the Sun Shines~"	6:18
6.	"Suzuka Tomita: Hiragana Keyakizaka46 ~Towards Where the Sun Shines~"	6:37
7.	"Miho Watanabe: Hiragana Keyakizaka46 ~Towards Where the Sun Shines~"	6:00
8.	"Hinano Kamimura: Hiragana Keyakizaka46 ~Towards Where the Sun Shines~"	5:37
Total length:		48:43

=== Type-C ===
CD
No.	Title	Length
1.	"Kyun"	5:00
2.	"Joyful Love"	4:35
3.	"Tokimeki Sō" (ときめき草)	4:15
4.	"Kyun" (off vocal ver.)	5:00
5.	"Joyful Love" (off vocal ver.)	4:35
6.	"Tokimeki Sō" (off vocal ver.)	4:13
Total length:		27:38

Blu-ray
No.	Title	Length
1.	"Kyun" (music video)	5:10
2.	"Tokimeki Sō" (music video)	4:25
3.	"Shiho Katō: Hiragana Keyakizaka46 ~Towards Where the Sun Shines~"	7:07
4.	"Kumi Sasaki: Hiragana Keyakizaka46 ~Towards Where the Sun Shines~"	7:35
5.	"Ayaka Takamoto: Hiragana Keyakizaka46 ~Towards Where the Sun Shines~"	7:01
6.	"Mei Higashimura: Hiragana Keyakizaka46 ~Towards Where the Sun Shines~"	8:27
7.	"Akari Nibu: Hiragana Keyakizaka46 ~Towards Where the Sun Shines~"	7:03
8.	"Hiyori Hamagishi: Hiragana Keyakizaka46 ~Towards Where the Sun Shines~"	6:56
9.	"Manamo Miyata: Hiragana Keyakizaka46 ~Towards Where the Sun Shines~"	7:34
Total length:		61:18

=== Regular edition ===
CD
No.	Title	Length
1.	"Kyun"	5:00
2.	"Joyful Love"	4:35
3.	"Chinmoku ga Ai Nara" (沈黙が愛なら)	4:24
4.	"Kyun" (off vocal ver.)	5:00
5.	"Joyful Love" (off vocal ver.)	4:35
6.	"Chinmoku ga Ai Nara" (off vocal ver.)	4:23
Total length:		27:57

== Personnel ==
=== "Kyun" ===
Center: Nao Kosaka

- 1st row: Mirei Sasaki, Kyōko Saitō, Nao Kosaka, Shiho Katō, Memi Kakizaki
- 2nd row: Kumi Sasaki, Akari Nibu, Hina Kawata, Ayaka Takamoto, Miho Watanabe, Mei Higashimura
- 3rd row: Suzuka Tomita, Hiyori Hamagishi, Mana Takase, Konoka Matsuda, Hinano Kamimura, Miku Kanemura, Mao Iguchi, Manamo Miyata, Sarina Ushio

=== "Joyful Love" ===
Mao Iguchi, Sarina Ushio, Memi Kakizaki, Shiho Katō, Kyokō Saitō, Kumi Sasaki, Mirei Sasaki, Mana Takase, Ayaka Takamoto, Mei Higashimura, Miku Kanemura, Hina Kawata, Nao Kosaka, Suzuka Tomita, Akari Nibu, Hiyori Hamagishi, Konoka Matsuda, Manamo Miyata, Miho Watanabe

=== "Tokimeki Sō" ===
Mao Iguchi, Sarina Ushio, Memi Kakizaki, Shiho Katō, Kyokō Saitō, Kumi Sasaki, Mirei Sasaki, Mana Takase, Ayaka Takamoto, Mei Higashimura, Miku Kanemura, Hina Kawata, Nao Kosaka, Suzuka Tomita, Akari Nibu, Hiyori Hamagishi, Konoka Matsuda, Manamo Miyata, Miho Watanabe, Hinano Kamimura

=== "Footsteps" ===
Shiho Katō, Kumi Sasaki, Mirei Sasaki, Ayaka Takamoto, Nao Kosaka

=== "Mimi ni Ochiru Namida" ===
Mao Iguchi, Sarina Ushio, Memi Kakizaki, Shiho Katō, Kyokō Saitō, Kumi Sasaki, Mirei Sasaki, Mana Takase, Ayaka Takamoto, Mei Higashimura

=== "Chinmoku ga Ai Nara" ===
Miku Kanemura, Hina Kawata, Nao Kosaka, Suzuka Tomita, Akari Nibu, Hiyori Hamagishi, Konoka Matsuda, Manamo Miyata, Miho Watanabe, Hinano Kamimura

== Charts ==
Weekly charts

Chart (2019)	Peak position
Japan (Japan Hot 100)	1
Japan (Oricon)	1

Year-end charts

Chart (2019)	Position
Japan (Japan Hot 100)	20
Japan (Oricon)	8
