= Kimi Shika Katan =

2021 single by Hinatazaka46

- Type-A cover

Single by Hinatazaka46

from the album Myakuutsu Kanjō
- B-side: "Koe no Ashiato"; "Nageki no Delete" (Type-A); "Right?" (Type-B); "Dōsuru? Dōsuru? Dōsuru?" (Type-C); "Sekai ni wa Thank you! ga Afurete Iru" (Type-D); "Bōdai na Yume ni Oshi Tsubusarete" (Regular)
- Released: May 26, 2021
- Genre: J-pop
- Length: 4:37
- Label: Sony Music Entertainment Japan
- Producer: Yasushi Akimoto

Hinatazaka46 singles chronology
"Sonna Koto Nai yo" (2020)	"Kimi Shika Katan" (2021)	"Tteka" (2021)

Music video
- "Kimi Shika Katan" on YouTube
- "Koe no Ashiato" on YouTube
- "Right?" on YouTube
- "Dōsuru? Dōsuru? Dōsuru?" on YouTube
- "Sekai ni wa Thank you! ga Afurete Iru" on YouTube

"Kimi Shika Katan" (Japanese: 君しか勝たん; lit. 'There's nobody better than you') is the 5th single by Japanese idol group Hinatazaka46. It was released on May 26, 2021, through Sony Music Entertainment Japan. The title track featured Shiho Katō as center, which is her first appearance in the position on a single.

== Production and release ==
The single was released in five versions: Type-A, Type-B, Type-C, Type-D, and a regular edition. All versions except for the regular edition also includes a Blu-ray Disc containing music videos and short videos featuring each member individually.

Shiho Katō was chosen for the first time as the center (lead performer) position of the title track. It was also her first center role after Hinatazaka46's rebranding in 2019, as her previous one was during their time as Hiragana Keyakizaka46 for "Happy Aura", a B-side in the Keyakizaka46 single "Ambivalent".

"Koe no Ashiato" is used as the theme song to the television series Koeharu!, which casts members of Hinatazaka46.

== Track listing ==
All lyrics written by Yasushi Akimoto.

=== Type-A ===
CD
No.	Title	Length
1.	"Kimi Shika Katan" (君しか勝たん)	4:37
2.	"Koe no Ashiato" (声の足跡)	4:47
3.	"Nageki no Delete" (嘆きのDelete)	3:38
4.	"Kimi Shika Katan" (off vocal ver.)	4:37
5.	"Koe no Ashiato" (off vocal ver.)	4:47
6.	"Nageki no Delete" (off vocal ver.)	3:36
Total length:		26:02

Blu-ray
No.	Title	Length
1.	"Kimi Shika Katan" (Music Video)	5:12
2.	"Koe no Ashiato" (Music Video)	4:58
3.	"Kyōko Saitō" (齊藤京子)	5:24
4.	"Mirei Sasaki" (佐々木美玲)	6:33
5.	"Mana Takase" (高瀬愛奈)	7:20
6.	"Miku Kanemura" (金村美玖)	5:08
7.	"Manamo Miyata" (宮田愛萌)	5:47
8.	"Haruyo Yamaguchi" (山口陽世)	7:25
Total length:		47:47

=== Type-B ===
CD
No.	Title	Length
1.	"Kimi Shika Katan" (君しか勝たん)	4:37
2.	"Koe no Ashiato" (声の足跡)	4:47
3.	"Right?"	4:03
4.	"Kimi Shika Katan" (off vocal ver.)	4:37
5.	"Koe no Ashiato" (off vocal ver.)	4:47
6.	"Right?" (off vocal ver.)	4:02
Total length:		26:53

Blu-ray
No.	Title	Length
1.	"Kimi Shika Katan" (Music Video)	5:12
2.	"Right?" (Music Video)	4:17
3.	"Sarina Ushio" (潮紗理菜)	7:46
4.	"Yūka Kageyama" (影山優佳)	8:08
5.	"Ayaka Takamoto" (高本彩花)	5:18
6.	"Akari Nibu" (丹生明里)	9:13
7.	"Konoka Matsuda" (松田好花)	7:59
8.	"Marī Morimoto" (森本茉莉)	8:04
Total length:		55:57

=== Type-C ===
CD
No.	Title	Length
1.	"Kimi Shika Katan" (君しか勝たん)	4:37
2.	"Koe no Ashiato" (声の足跡)	4:47
3.	"Dōsuru? Dōsuru? Dōsuru?" (どうする?どうする?どうする?)	4:19
4.	"Kimi Shika Katan" (off vocal ver.)	4:37
5.	"Koe no Ashiato" (off vocal ver.)	4:47
6.	"Dōsuru? Dōsuru? Dōsuru?" (off vocal ver.)	4:18
Total length:		27:25

Blu-ray
No.	Title	Length
1.	"Kimi Shika Katan" (Music Video)	5:12
2.	"Dōsuru? Dōsuru? Dōsuru?" (Music Video)	6:32
3.	"Nao Kosaka" (小坂菜緒)	7:08
4.	"Suzuka Tomita" (富田鈴花)	6:58
5.	"Hiyori Hamagishi" (濱岸ひより)	8:06
6.	"Miho Watanabe" (渡邉美穂)	8:17
7.	"Hinano Kamimura" (上村ひなの)	8:19
Total length:		50:32

=== Type-D ===
CD
No.	Title	Length
1.	"Kimi Shika Katan" (君しか勝たん)	4:37
2.	"Koe no Ashiato" (声の足跡)	4:47
3.	"Sekai ni wa Thank you! ga Afurete Iru" (世界にはThank you!が溢れている)	5:14
4.	"Kimi Shika Katan" (off vocal ver.)	4:37
5.	"Koe no Ashiato" (off vocal ver.)	4:47
6.	"Sekai ni wa Thank you! ga Afurete Iru" (off vocal ver.)	5:13
Total length:		29:15

Blu-ray
No.	Title	Length
1.	"Kimi Shika Katan" (Music Video)	5:12
2.	"Sekai ni wa Thank you! ga Afurete Iru" (Music Video)	5:26
3.	"Shiho Katō" (加藤史帆)	6:14
4.	"Kumi Sasaki" (佐々木久美)	3:45
5.	"Mei Higashimura" (東村芽依)	3:42
6.	"Hina Kawata" (河田陽菜)	8:47
7.	"Mikuni Takahashi" (髙橋未来虹)	5:29
Total length:		38:35

=== Regular Edition ===
CD
No.	Title	Length
1.	"Kimi Shika Katan" (君しか勝たん)	4:37
2.	"Koe no Ashiato" (声の足跡)	4:47
3.	"Bōdai na Yume ni Oshi Tsubusarete" (膨大な夢に押し潰されて)	4:15
4.	"Kimi Shika Katan" (off vocal ver.)	4:37
5.	"Koe no Ashiato" (off vocal ver.)	4:47
6.	"Bōdai na Yume ni Oshi Tsubusarete" (off vocal ver.)	4:14
Total length:		27:17

== Personnel ==
=== "Kimi Shika Katan" ===
Center: Shiho Katō

- 1st row: Hina Kawata, Miku Kanemura, Shiho Katō, Nao Kosaka, Akari Nibu
- 2nd row: Mei Higashimura, Hinano Kamimura, Ayaka Takamoto, Kyōko Saitō, Mirei Sasaki, Hiyori Hamagishi, Miho Watanabe
- 3rd row: Suzuka Tomita, Mikuni Takahashi, Mana Takase, Haruyo Yamaguchi, Konoka Matsuda, Yūka Kageyama, Marī Morimoto, Manamo Miyata, Sarina Ushio, Kumi Sasaki

=== "Koe no Ashiato" ===
Two Center: Mirei Sasaki, Akari Nibu

- 1st row: Shiho Katō, Hina Kawata, Akari Nibu, Mirei Sasaki, Miku Kanemura, Nao Kosaka
- 2nd row: Kyōko Saitō, Sarina Ushio, Hinano Kamimura, Miho Watanabe, Ayaka Takamoto, Konoka Matsuda, Suzuka Tomita
- 3rd row: Mikuni Takahashi, Marī Morimoto, Haruyo Yamaguchi, Hiyori Hamagishi, Mei Higashimura, Kumi Sasaki, Manamo Miyata, Mana Takase, Yūka Kageyama

=== "Nageki no Delete" ===
- Shiho Katō（Solo Songs）

=== "Right?" ===
- Marī Morimoto, Haruyo Yamaguchi, Hinano Kamimura, Mikuni Takahashi（3rd Generation Songs）

=== "Dōsuru? Dōsuru? Dōsuru?" ===
Center: Mei Higashimura

- 1st row: Ayaka Takamoto, Mei Higashimura, Kyōko Saitō
- 2nd row: Mana Takase, Shiho Katō, Sarina Ushio, Mirei Sasaki, Kumi Sasaki, Yūka Kageyama（1st Generation Songs）

=== "Sekai ni wa Thank you! ga Afurete Iru" ===
Center: Nao Kosaka

- 1st row: Miku Kanemura, Nao Kosaka, Miho Watanabe
- 2nd row: Hiyori Hamagishi, Suzuka Tomita, Hina Kawata, Akari Nibu, Konoka Matsuda, Manamo Miyata（2nd Generation Songs）

=== "Bōdai na Yume ni Oshi Tsubusarete" ===
Center: Shiho Katō

- 1st row: Hina Kawata, Miku Kanemura, Shiho Katō, Nao Kosaka, Akari Nibu
- 2nd row: Mei Higashimura, Hinano Kamimura, Ayaka Takamoto, Kyōko Saitō, Mirei Sasaki, Hiyori Hamagishi, Miho Watanabe
- 3rd row: Suzuka Tomita, Mikuni Takahashi, Mana Takase, Haruyo Yamaguchi, Konoka Matsuda, Yūka Kageyama, Marī Morimoto, Manamo Miyata, Sarina Ushio, Kumi Sasaki

== Charts ==
=== Weekly charts ===
Weekly chart performance for "Kimi Shika Katan"
Chart (2021)	Peak position	First week sales
Japan (Japan Hot 100)	2	503,745
Japan (Oricon)	1	486,000

=== Year-end charts ===
Year-end chart performance for "Kimi Shika Katan"
Chart (2021)	Position
Japan (Oricon)	10
