= BoA singles discography =

South Korean musician discography

BoA discography
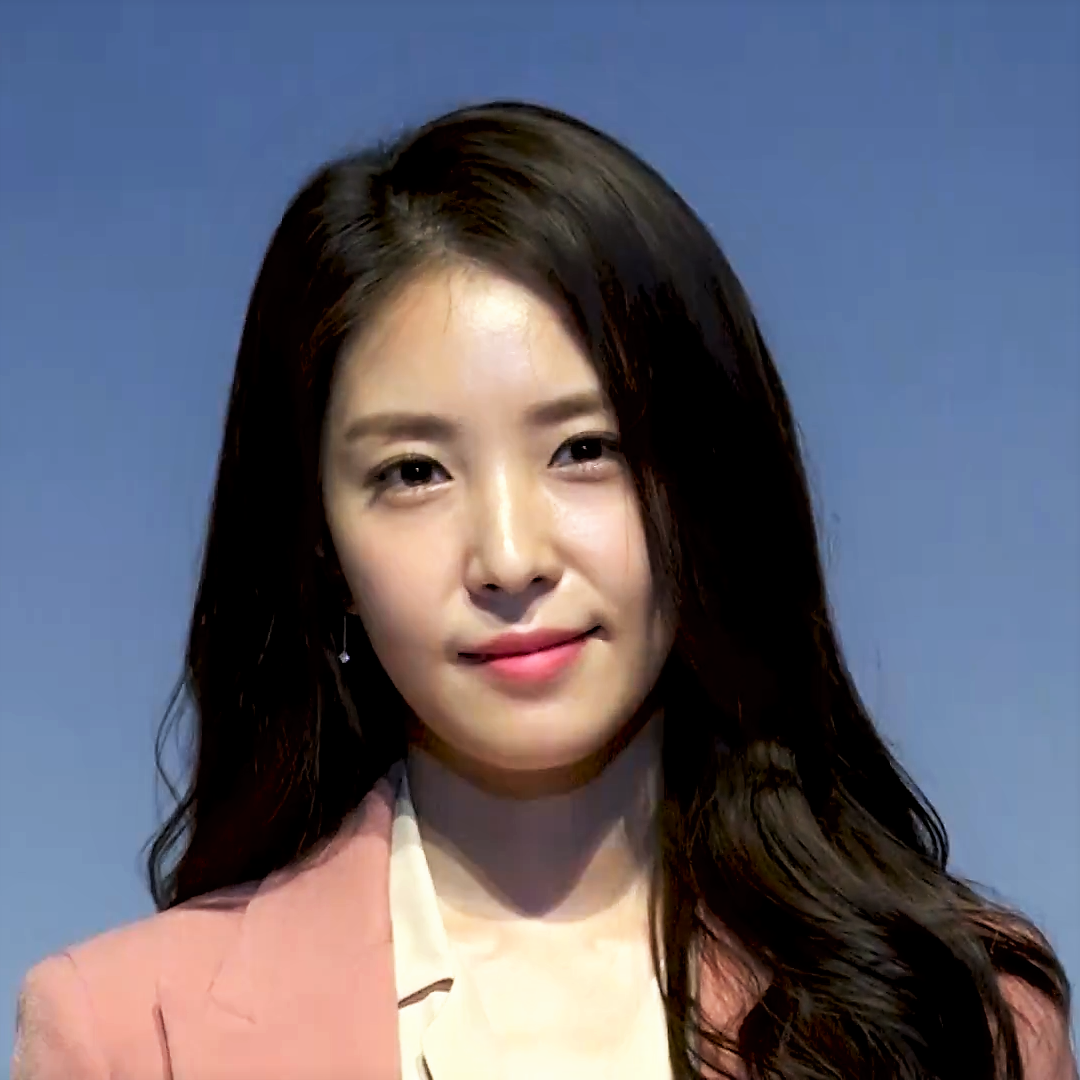
- BoA in 2018
- Singles: 63
- Promotional singles: 18
- Collaboration singles: 13

The discography of South Korean musician BoA consists of twenty-one studio albums (three of which were reissued), eight compilation albums, three extended plays (EPs) and numerous singles. Many of her songs have been released bilingually in both territories, such as "Valenti" (2002), "Double" (2003), "Everlasting" (2006) and "Only One" (2012).

In 2008, BoA made her debut in the United States with the single "Eat You Up", followed by the album BoA (2009). In 2010, BoA released her first Korean language album in five years, Hurricane Venus, which spawned the title track, "Game", and "Copy & Paste". Her 2012 single, "Only One", sold over two million downloads in South Korea.

== As lead artist ==
=== Korean singles ===
List of BoA singles released in Korean
Title	Year	Peak chart positions			Sales (Note: Korean and English single sales are for digital downloads, while Japanese sales are for physical, unless otherwise noted.)	Album
Title	Year	KOR (Note: Week references for Gaon: "Game", "Hurricane Venus", "Copy & Paste", "Han Salam (My Only One)", "Milestone", "One Dream", "Only One", "The Shadow", "Disturbance", "Between Heaven and Hell", "Action", "Lookin'", "G.A.B", "Who Are You", "Kiss My Lips", "Double Jack". "Nega Dola" "One Shot, Two Shot" "Feedback" "Starry Night")	KOR Hot	US World	Sales	Album
"ID; Peace B" (Note: Released in Japan in 2001.)	2000	—	—	—		ID; Peace B
"Don't Start Now" (Note: Released in Japan in 2002.)	2001	—	—	—		Jumping into the World
"No. 1"	2002	—	—	—		No. 1
"Valenti"	2002	—	—	—		Miracle
"Shine We Are!"	2003	—	—	—		Shine We Are!
"Atlantis Princess" (아틀란티스 소녀)	2003	—	—	—		Atlantis Princess
"Milky Way" (Note: Released in Japan as the title "Milky Way 〜君の歌〜")	2003	—	—	—		Atlantis Princess
"Double"	2003	8 (Note: The physical single charted on the RIAK monthly album chart.)	—	—	KOR: 43,000 (phy.)	Non-album singles
"Rock with You"	2003	11 (Note: The physical single charted on the RIAK monthly album chart.)	—	—	KOR: 23,000 (phy.)	Non-album singles
"My Name"	2004	—	—	—		My Name
"Spark"	2004	—	—	—		My Name
"Merry Chri"	2004	10 (Note: The physical single charted on the RIAK monthly album chart.)	—	—	KOR: 20,000 (phy.)	Non-album single
"Girls on Top"	2005	—	—	—		Girls on Top
"Moto"	2005	—	—	—		Girls on Top
"Everlasting"	2006	6 (Note: The physical single charted on the RIAK monthly album chart.)	—	—	KOR: 19,000 (phy.) (Note: Sales refer to the Korean-language version of the single.)	Non-album singles
"Key of Heart"	2006	—	—	—		Non-album singles
"Game"	2010	6	—	—	KOR: 998,000	Hurricane Venus
"Hurricane Venus"	2010	3	—	—	KOR: 1,537,000	Hurricane Venus
"Copy & Paste"	2010	14	—	—		Copy & Paste
"Only One" (Note: Released in Japan in 2013.)	2012	2	—	7	KOR: 2,130,000	Only One
"Disturbance" (그런 너)	2013	5	—	8	KOR: 794,000	Non-album single (Note: Though featured on Who's Back?, the Japanese version of "Disturbance" was never released as a single from the album.)
"Who Are You" (featuring Gaeko)	2015	3	—	16	KOR: 566,000	Kiss My Lips
"Kiss My Lips"	2015	18	—	12	KOR: 128,000	Kiss My Lips
"Spring Rain" (봄비)	2017	—	—	—	KOR: 36,040	SM Station Season 2
"Camo"	2017	54	—	11	KOR: 135,000	One Shot, Two Shot
"Nega Dola" (내가 돌아)	2018	70	73	25		One Shot, Two Shot
"One Shot, Two Shot"	2018	93	79	—		One Shot, Two Shot
"Woman"	2018	— (Note: "Woman" did not enter the Gaon Digital chart top 100, but peaked at no. 27 on Gaon Download chart.)	86	—		Woman
"Feedback" (featuring Nucksal)	2019	169	—	—		Non-album single
"Starry Night" (featuring Crush)	2019	157	—	—		Starry Night
"Better"	2020	94	52	—		Better
"Forgive Me"	2022	— (Note: "Forgive Me" did not enter the Circle Digital chart top 200, but peaked at no. 14 on Circle Download chart.)	—	—		Forgive Me
"Emptiness"	2024	— (Note: "Emptiness" did not enter the Circle Digital Chart, but peaked at number 38 on the Download Chart.)	—	—		Non-album single
"Crazier"	2025	— (Note: "Crazier" did not enter the Circle Digital Chart, but peaked at number 16 on the Download Chart.)	—	—		Crazier

=== Japanese singles ===
List of BoA singles released in Japanese
Title	Year	Peak chart positions				Sales (Note: Korean and English single sales are for digital downloads, while Japanese sales are for physical, unless otherwise noted.)	Certifications	Album
Title	Year	KOR	JPN	JPN Hot (Note: Sources for chart positions are as follows: "Merry Chri", "Be with You", "Kissing You", "Sparkling", "Eien", "Girlfriend", "Bump Bump!", "Mamoritai (White Wishes)", "Possibility", "Woo Weekend", "I See Me", "Milestone", "Only One", "Tail of Hope", "Shout It Out", "Masayume Chasing", "Fly", "Lookbook".)	TWN East Asia (Note: Positions were taken from 2005 week 31 for Girls on Top, 2006 week 7 for Outgrow, 2007 week 6 for Made in Twenty (20), 2008 week 11 for The Face, 2008 week 23 for "Vivid", 2009 week 10 for "Eien", 2009 week 14 for Best & USA, 2009 week 44 for "Bump Bump", 2009 week 51 for "Mamoritai", 2010 week 9 for Identity, 2010 week 33 for "Woo Weekend", 2010 week 28 for Hurricane Venus, 2011 week 52 for "Milestone", 2012 week 37 for Only One, 2013 week 12 for "Only One", 2013 week 29 for "Tail of Hope", 2013 week 46 for "Message/Call My Name", 2014 week 14 for "Shout It Out", 2014 week 40 for Who's Back?, 2015 week 1 for "Fly", Kiss My Lips.)	Sales	Certifications	Album
"ID; Peace B"	2001	—	20	—	—	JPN: 40,000		Listen to My Heart
"Amazing Kiss"	2001	—	23	—	—	JPN: 59,000		Listen to My Heart
"Kimochi wa Tsutawaru" (気持ちはつたわる)	2001	—	15	—	—	JPN: 77,000		Listen to My Heart
"Listen to My Heart"	2002	—	5	—	—	JPN: 180,000	RIAJ: Gold (phy.)	Listen to My Heart
"Every Heart (Minna no Kimochi)" (Every Heart -ミンナノキモチ-)	2002	—	10	—	—	JPN: 84,000		Listen to My Heart
"Don't Start Now"	2002	—	17	—	—	JPN: 21,000		Listen to My Heart
"Valenti"	2002	—	2	—	—	JPN: 202,000	RIAJ: Gold (phy.); Gold (dig.); Gold (str.)	Valenti
"Kiseki" / "No. 1" (奇蹟)	2002	—	3	—	—	JPN: 129,000	RIAJ: Gold (phy.)	Valenti
"Jewel Song" / "Beside You (Boku o Yobu Koe)"	2002	—	3	—	—	JPN: 151,000	RIAJ: Gold (phy.); Gold (dig.)	Valenti
"Shine We Are!" / "Earthsong"	2003	—	2	—	—	JPN: 144,000	RIAJ: Platinum (phy.)	Love & Honesty
"Double"	2003	—	2	—	—	JPN: 82,000	RIAJ: Gold (phy.)	Love & Honesty
"Rock with You"	2003	—	5	—	—	JPN: 58,000	RIAJ: Gold (phy.)	Love & Honesty
"Be the One"	2004	—	15	—	—	JPN: 24,000		Love & Honesty
"Quincy" / "Kono Yo no Shirushi"	2004	—	4	—	—	JPN: 82,000	RIAJ: Gold (phy.)	Best of Soul
"Meri Kuri" (メリクリ)	2004	—	5	36 (Note: Charted in 2011, and at number 44 at number 2014.)	—	JPN: 137,000	RIAJ: Gold (phy.); 2× Platinum (dig.); 2× Platinum (rt.); Platinum (str.)	Best of Soul
"Do the Motion"	2005	—	1	—	—	JPN: 170,000	RIAJ: Gold (phy.)	Outgrow
"Make a Secret"	2005	—	5	—	—	JPN: 54,000	RIAJ: Gold (phy.)	Outgrow
"Dakishimeru" (抱きしめる)	2005	—	9	—	—	JPN: 58,000	RIAJ: Gold (phy.)	Outgrow
"Everlasting"	2006	—	4	—	—	JPN: 74,000; KOR: 5,000 (phy.)	RIAJ: Gold (phy.); 2× Platinum (rt.)	Outgrow
"Nanairo no Ashita: Brand New Beat" / "Your Color"	2006	—	3	—	—	JPN: 91,000; KOR: 4,000	RIAJ: Gold (phy.); 2× Platinum (rt.)	Made in Twenty (20)
"Key of Heart" / "Dotch"	2006	—	7	—	—	JPN: 41,000	RIAJ: Gold (phy.)	Made in Twenty (20)
"Winter Love"	2006	—	2	—	—	JPN: 99,000	RIAJ: Gold (phy.); 3× Platinum (rt.)	Made in Twenty (20)
"Sweet Impact"	2007	4 (Note: Charted on the RIAK monthly international chart.)	5	—	—	JPN: 42,000; KOR: 6,000	RIAJ: Gold (phy.); Gold (rt.)	The Face
"Love Letter"	2007	—	3	—	—	JPN: 44,000	RIAJ: Gold (dig.)	The Face
"Lose Your Mind" (featuring Yutaka Furukawa from Doping Panda)	2007	—	6	—	—	JPN: 28,000		The Face
"Be with You"	2008	—	13	8	—	JPN: 16,000		The Face
"Kissing You" (Note: "Kissing You", "Sparkling" and "Joyful Smile" were packaged together as a single single given the title Vivid.)	2008	—	5	17	7	JPN: 29,000		Non-album single
"Sparkling"	2008	—	5	88	7	JPN: 29,000		Best & USA
"Joyful Smile"	2008	—	5	—	7	JPN: 29,000		Non-album single
"Eien" (永遠)	2009	—	8	23	2	JPN: 22,000	RIAJ: Gold (rt.)	Best & USA
"Universe" (featuring Crystal Kay and Verbal (M-Flo))	2009	—	8	—	2	JPN: 22,000		Best & USA
"Bump Bump!" (featuring Verbal)	2009	—	8	6	2	JPN: 14,000		Identity
"Mamoritai (White Wishes)" (まもりたい 〜White Wishes〜)	2009	—	3	4	5	JPN: 51,000	RIAJ: Gold (rt.); Platinum(dig.)	Identity
"Woo Weekend"	2010	— (Note: Charted at number 78 on the Gaon international chart.)	10	17	16	JPN: 12,000		Who's Back?
"I See Me"	2010	— (Note: Charted at number 82 on the Gaon international chart.)	—	64	—			Who's Back?
"Milestone"	2011	14	11 (Note: Charted on the DVD chart.)	7	—	KOR: 2,000		Who's Back?
"Only One"	2013	—	10	8	9	JPN: 11,000; KOR: 2,000 (phy.)		Who's Back?
"Tail of Hope"	2013	—	12	19	7	JPN: 11,000		Who's Back?
"Message" / "Call My Name"	2013	— (Note: "Message" charted at number 35 on the Gaon international chart, while "Call My Name" charted at number 93.)	13	— (Note: Charted at number 28 on the Hot Singles Sales chart.)	4	JPN: 7,000		Who's Back?
"Shout It Out"	2014	— (Note: Charted at number 34 on the Gaon international chart.)	12	38	5	JPN: 8,000		Who's Back?
"Masayume Chasing"	2014	— (Note: Charted at number 54 on the Gaon international chart.)	15	27	—	JPN: 9,000		Who's Back?
"Fly"	2014	—	22	80	1	JPN: 6,000		Watashi Kono Mama de Ii no Kana
"Lookbook"	2015	—	16	98	—	JPN: 7,000		Watashi Kono Mama de Ii no Kana
"Make Me Complete"	2016	—	—	— (Note: Charted at number 30 on the Radio Songs sub-chart.)	—			Watashi Kono Mama de Ii no Kana
"Right Here, Right Everywhere"	2017	—	—	—	—			Watashi Kono Mama de Ii no Kana
"Jazzclub"	2018	—	—	—	—			Watashi Kono Mama de Ii no Kana
"Suki da yo (My Love)" / "Amor"	2018	—	25	—	—	JPN: 2,300		Non-album singles
"Wishing Well"	2019	—	—	—	—			Non-album singles
"I Believe"	2020	—	22	—	—			Non-album singles
"My Dear"	2021	—	—	—	—			The Greatest
"The Greatest"	2022	—	—	—	—			The Greatest
"Young & Free"	2025	—	—	—	—			Non-album singles
"Good for U"	2025	—	—	—	—			Non-album singles
"—" denotes a song that was released before the creation of the Gaon, Japan Hot 100 or G-Music charts, was not released in this region, or did not chart.

=== English singles ===
List of BoA singles released in English
Title	Year	Peak chart positions		Sales (Note: Korean and English single sales are for digital downloads, while Japanese sales are for physical, unless otherwise noted.)	Album
Title	Year	TWN East Asia	US Dance Club	Sales	Album
"Eat You Up"	2008	—	8	US: 28,000	BoA
"I Did It for Love" (featuring Sean Garrett)	2009	19	19	US: 4,000	BoA
"Energetic"	2009	—	17		BoA: Deluxe
"Ain't No Hard Feelings"	2026	—	—		Non-album single

== As a collaborating artist ==
List of singles, with selected chart positions
Title	Year	Peak chart positions			Sales	Certifications	Album
Title	Year	KOR	JPN (Note: Sources for chart positions are as follows: "The Meaning of Peace", "Everything Needs Love", "Holiday", "Show Me What You Got", "The Love Bug", "Believe in Love", "Girlfriend".)	JPN Hot	Sales	Certifications	Album
"The Meaning of Peace" (Kumi Koda and BoA)	2001	—	12	—	JPN: 67,000		Song Nation / Listen to My Heart
"Everything Needs Love" (Mondo Grosso featuring BoA)	2002	—	27	—	JPN: 17,000		Next Wave
"Flying Without Wings" (Westlife featuring BoA)	2002	—	—	—			Unbreakable: The Greatest Hits Volume 1
"Holiday" (Palm Drive featuring BoA & Firstklas)	2003	—	32	—	JPN: 25,000		Block Holiday
"Show Me What You Got" (Bratz featuring BoA & Howie D.)	2003	—	37	—	JPN: 11,000		Non-album single
"The Love Bug" (M-Flo loves BoA)	2004	—	8	—	JPN: 56,000	RIAJ: Gold (phy.)	Astromantic
"Tri-Angle" (TVXQ featuring BoA and TRAX)	2004	—	—	—			Tri-Angle
"Hey Boy, Hey Girl" (Seamo featuring BoA)	2007	—	—	—			Round About
"TPL (Talk, Play, Love)" (among AnyBand)	2007	—	—	—			AnyBand
"Believe in Love" (Note: Also released as an acoustic version on BoA's "Eien/Universe/Believe in Love" single.) (Ravex featuring BoA)	2009	—	35	— (Note: Charted at number 43 on the Hot Singles Sales chart.)	JPN: 3,000		Best & USA / Trax
"Girlfriend" (Crystal Kay featuring BoA)	2009	—	31 (Note: Released physically as a double A-side single with Crystal Kay's "After Love (First Boyfriend)".)	57	JPN: 4,000		Best of Crystal Kay
"Lookin'" (BoA featuring The Quiett)	2012	19	—	—			PYL Younique Volume 1
"G.A.B" (G.A.B (Gil & BoA))	2013	10	—	—	KOR: 379,000		Free Highway Music Festival
"No Matter What" (BoA ft. Beenzino)	2016	3	—	—	KOR: 276,889		SM Station Season 1
"Music Is Wonderful" (BeatBurger featuring BoA)	2016	—	—	—			SM Station Season 1
"Tonight" (with Mad Clown)	2017	89	—	—	KOR: 41,287		The Best Hit OST Part.4
"Man in the Mirror (LIVE)" (Siedah Garrett X BoA)	2018	—	—	—			S.M. Station Season 2
"Autopilot" (Junoflo featuring BoA)	2018	—	—	—			Statues
"—" denotes items which were released before the creation of the Gaon, Billboard Japan Hot 100 or RIAJ monthly ringtones chart, or items that did not chart.

== Promotional singles ==
Title	Year	Peak chart positions		Certifications	Album
Title	Year	KOR	JPN Hot	Certifications	Album
"Sara" (사라)	2000	—	—		ID; Peace B
"My Sweetie"	2002	—	—		No. 1
"Waiting.." (늘.. Neul)	2002	—	—		No. 1
"The Lights of Seoul" (서울의 빛 Seoul-ui Bich)	2003	—	—		Atlantis Princess
"Kimi no Tonari de" (キミのとなりで; "Next to You")	2005	—	—	RIAJ: 2× Platinum (rt.)	"Do the Motion" (single) / Outgrow
"Sunshine"	2006	—	—		Love Me Not Soundtrack
"M"	2007	—	—		M OST
"Diamond Heart"	2007	—	—		"Love Letter" (single) / The Face
"Beautiful Flowers"	2007	—	—		"Love Letter" (single) / The Face
"Look Who's Talking"	2008	—	—		BoA
"Possibility" (duet with Daichi Miura)	2010	— (Note: Charted at number 90 on the Gaon international chart.)	58		Identity
"Han Saram (My Only One)" (한 사람, "One Person")	2011	59	—		Paradise Ranch: Original Soundtrack
"One Dream" (featuring Henry of Super Junior-M and Key of Shinee)	2012	34	—		Only One
"The Shadow"	2012	34	—		Only One / Who's Back?
"Between Heaven and Hell" (천국과 지옥 사이 Cheonguggwa Jiog Sai)	2013	18	—		Shark Original Soundtrack
"Action" (Note: Song used to promote Gwangju Biennale.)	2013	83	—		Non-album single
"First Time"	2014	—	— (Note: Charted at number 76 on the Adult Alternative Airplay chart.)		Who's Back?
"Little Bird" (Note: Song used to promote Vogue with the theme of 'Hope'.)	2020	—	—		Better
"—" denotes items which were released before the creation of the listed charts, or items that did not chart.

== Other charted songs ==
Title	Year	Peak chart positions	Album
Title	Year	KOR (Note: Week references for Gaon: "Yeop Saram (Stand By)", "Hanbyeol (Implode)", "Adrenaline", "M.E.P (My Electronic Piano)", "Haruharu (Ordinary Day)" "Don't Know What to Say", "Romance", "Dangerous", "Distance", "Mayday! Mayday!", "Nemonan Bakwi (Hope)", "Not Over U", "The Top".)	Album
"This Is Who I Am"	2010	— (Note: Charted at number 18 on the Gaon international chart.)	Identity
"Yeop Saram (Stand By)" (옆 사람, "Neighbor")	2010	46	Hurricane Venus
"Hanbyeol (Implode)" (한별, "Celebrity") (featuring Kim Jong-wan of Nell)	2010	96	Hurricane Venus
"Adrenaline"	2010	99	Hurricane Venus
"Dangerous"	2010	43	Hurricane Venus
"M.E.P (My Electronic Piano)"	2010	101	Hurricane Venus
"Haruharu (Ordinary Day)" (하루하루)	2010	109	Hurricane Venus
"Don't Know What to Say"	2010	113	Hurricane Venus
"Romance" (로망스 Romangseu)	2010	124	Hurricane Venus
"Distance"	2011	137	Winter: The Warmest Gift
"Mayday! Mayday!" (너에게 닿기를 간절히 외치다)	2012	47	Only One
"Nemonan Bakwi (Hope)" (네모난 바퀴, "Square Wheels")	2012	55	Only One
"Not Over U"	2012	60	Only One
"The Top"	2012	62	Only One
"Close to Me"	2014	— (Note: Charted at number 98 on the Gaon international chart.)	"Shout It Out" / Who's Back?
"Double Jack" (featuring Eddy Kim)	2015	95	Kiss My Lips

== Other appearances ==
The following songs are not singles or promotional singles and have not appeared on an album by BoA.

Title	Year	Other artists	Album
"Changbakk-eul Bwayo (Waiting for White Christmas)" (창밖을 봐요, "Look Out the Window")	2000	SM Town	Christmas Winter Vacation in SMTown.com
"Merry Christmas"	2000		Christmas Winter Vacation in SMTown.com
"Christmas Time"	2000		Christmas Winter Vacation in SMTown.com
"I Want"	2001	Fly to the Sky, Kangta	The Promise
"Angel Eyes"	2001	SM Town	Christmas Winter Vacation in SMTown.com: Angel Eyes
"Feliz Navidad"	2001		Christmas Winter Vacation in SMTown.com: Angel Eyes
"Gyeoulbaram (Winter Wind)" (겨울바람)	2001		Christmas Winter Vacation in SMTown.com: Angel Eyes
"Summer Vacation"	2002	SM Town	Summer Vacation in SMTown.com
"My Boy"	2002		Summer Vacation in SMTown.com
"Amazing Kiss (Korean Version)"	2002		Summer Vacation in SMTown.com
"My Angel, My Light"	2002	SM Town	2002 Winter Vacation in SMTown.com: My Angel My Light
"Snow in My Mind"	2002	Shoo, M.I.L.K	2002 Winter Vacation in SMTown.com: My Angel My Light
"Dear My Family"	2002	SM Town	2002 Winter Vacation in SMTown.com: My Angel My Light
"Jewel Song (Korean Version)"	2002		2002 Winter Vacation in SMTown.com: My Angel My Light
"Hello! Summer!"	2003	SM Town	2003 Summer Vacation in SMTown.com
"Summer in Dream"	2003	Moon Hee-joon, Shoo, Jae Won, Hyun-Jin, Jae Young	2003 Summer Vacation in SMTown.com
"Romeo"	2003		2003 Summer Vacation in SMTown.com
"Dubeonjjae Gyeoul (Snowflake)" (두번째 겨울, "Second Winter")	2003	SM Town	2003 Winter Vacation in SMTown.com
"Feel the Same (Korean Version)"	2003		2003 Winter Vacation in SMTown.com
"Oh Holy Night"	2004	TVXQ	"Hug" (single)
"Hot Mail (Yeoleumpyeonji)" (여름편지, "Summer Letter")	2004	SM Town	2004 Summer Vacation in SMTown.com
"Lollipop"	2004		2004 Summer Vacation in SMTown.com
"Midnight Parade (Korean Version)"	2004		2004 Summer Vacation in SMTown.com
"Survival Dance (No No Cry More)"	2006	TRF	Lif-e-Motions
"Full Sun (Red Sun)"	2006	SM Town	2006 Summer SMTown
"Touch"	2006		2006 Summer SMTown
"Snow Dream"	2006	SM Town	2006 Winter SMTown: Snow Dream
"Dotch (Korean Version)"	2006		2006 Winter SMTown: Snow Dream
"Let's Go on a Trip!"	2007	SM Town	2007 Summer SMTown: Fragile
"Ibeuui Gyeong-go (Eve Warning)" (이브의 경고)	2007	Shindong	2007 Summer SMTown: Fragile
"Jogaekkeobjil Mukk-eo (Tie Clam Shells) (A Cappella)" (조개껍질 묶어)	2007	Junsu, Changmin, Lina, Sunday, Ryeowook, Yesung	2007 Summer SMTown: Fragile
"Promise U"	2007	Anyband	Anyband
"Daydream"	2007	Anyband	Anyband
"Only Love"	2007	SM Town	2007 Winter SMTown: Only Love
"12wol 27il (On December 27th)" (12월 27일 Yeolduwol Isibchilil)	2007		2007 Winter SMTown: Only Love
"Beautiful"	2009	Akon, Kardinal Offishall	Freedom+2
"Egao no Yukue" (笑顔の行方; "Where the Smile Is")	2009	Dreams Come True	Minna de Dori Suru? Do You Dreams Come True? Special Live!
"Love Love Love"	2009	Dreams Come True	Minna de Dori Suru? Do You Dreams Come True? Special Live!
"Distance"	2011		2011 Winter SMTown: The Warmest Gift
"Let Me In" (Note: Ending theme song for the film Make Your Move)	2013		Make Your Move
"Swing"	2019	U-Know	True Colors
"End of a Day"	2025		2025 SM Town: The Culture, the Future
