= Who's Back? =

- Digital and CD/DVD edition cover.

Studio album by BoA
- Released: September 3, 2014
- Recorded: 2010–2014
- Genres: Pop; contemporary R&B
- Length: 53:07
- Language: Japanese
- Label: Avex Trax

BoA chronology
Only One (2012)	Who's Back? (2014)	Kiss My Lips (2015)

Singles from Who's Back?
- 1. "Woo Weekend" Released: July 21, 2010; 2. "I See Me" Released: December 8, 2010; 3. "Milestone" Released: December 7, 2011; 4. "Only One" Released: February 20, 2013; 5. "Tail of Hope" Released: June 26, 2013; 6. "Message" Released: October 23, 2013; 7. "Shout It Out" Released: February 26, 2014; 8. "Masayume Chasing" Released: July 23, 2014; 9. "First Time" Released: September 3, 2014

Who's Back? is the eighth Japanese-language studio album (thirteenth overall) by South Korean singer BoA. It was released on September 3, 2014, by Avex Trax and compiles all of her singles released since her previous studio album Identity (2010).

== Background and development ==
After her 2009 English language debut BoA (2009) and her seventh Japanese album Identity (2010), BoA focused on releasing music in South Korea. In 2010, BoA released Hurricane Venus, her first Korean studio album in five years, followed by Only One (2012). In 2011, to celebrate 10 years since her Japanese debut, she released a video single, "Milestone".

Three of the songs on the album were originally released in South Korea as singles: "Only One" and "The Shadow" from Only One (2012), and "Baby You..", a Japanese version of BoA's song "Disturbance" (2013). All three songs featured writing credits by BoA herself. The majority of the songs on the album were released as Japanese singles, with four of the remaining songs being B-sides for these singles ("The Shadow", "Baby You..", "Close to Me", "Fun"), and a single new song, "First Time".

== Promotion and release ==
Many of the songs during their initial released had commercial tie-ups, such as "Woo Weekend" which was used as the 25th anniversary song for Disney on Ice Japan, and both "I See Mee" and "Milestone", which were used in commercials for Audio-Technica headphones. Several songs were theme songs for television programs: the song "Tail of Hope" was used as the opening theme song for the drama Hakui no Namida, while "Message" was used for the online Bee TV drama Love Message!'s theme song. "Masayume Chasing" was used as an opening theme song for the first thirteen episodes of the seventh season of the anime Fairy Tail.

The song "First Time", the only new song found on the release, was used to promote Who's Back?, and received a music video, featuring footage of BoA recording the song. The song had minor success, charting at number 76 on the Adult Alternative Airplay chart.

== Critical reception ==
CDJournal felt that the album, compiled of almost entirely previously released works, acted more like a greatest hits album than a studio album. The reviewers felt that the album was impressive in the wide range of genres and techniques used, going from "up-tempo dancable pop tunes" to "melancholic medium ballads". For the individual songs, the reviewers felt that "Woo Weekend" had "relaxing light vocals" and a "comfortable, soft melody line", and praised her "poppy, colorful and innocent approach", and that "Only One" was a "perfectly expressed" ballad with a high level of skills. They praised the "fresh" summer feeling of "Tail of Hope", and felt "Baby You.." (i.e. "Disturbance") was a high quality, adult song.

== Track listing ==
No.	Title	Lyrics	Music	Length
1.	"First Time"	Sara Sakurai	Ciaron Bell, Chelcee Grimes, Wesley Steed, Chris Wahlberg	3:47
2.	"Shout It Out"	Sakurai	Kanata Okajima, Daniel Sherman, Ricky Hanley	4:02
3.	"Only One"	BoA	BoA	3:39
4.	"Fun"	Akira (Palm Drive)	Erik Lidbom, Martin K	4:05
5.	"Message"	Okajima	Lidbom, Andreas Öberg	3:06
6.	"Woo Weekend"	Yoko Haji	Daiki	3:56
7.	"Milestone"	STY	Paul Drew, Greig Watts, Pete Barringer, Rike Boomgaarden	3:07
8.	"I See Me"	STY	STY	5:04
9.	"Masayume Chasing" (True Dream Chasing)	Junji Ishiwatari	Steven Lee, Caroline Gustavsson	3:41
10.	"The Shadow"	BoA	Joe Belmaati	3:22
11.	"Close to Me"	Akira (Palm Drive)	Ina Wroldsen	4:20
12.	"Call My Name"	Sakurai	Nemin Harambasic, Anne Judith Wik, Ronny Svendsen, Yuta Nakano	3:44
13.	"Baby You.."	BoA	BoA	3:19
14.	"Tail of Hope"	Sakurai	Claire Rodrigues, Sherman, Andrew Gilbert	3:49
Total length:				53:07

DVD
No.	Title	Director	Length
1.	"First Time"	Kenta Tanoue	3:47
2.	"Shout It Out"	Daisuke Ninomiya	4:02
3.	"Only One"	Toshiyuki Suzuki	3:39
4.	"Message"	Kwon Soon-wook	3:06
5.	"Woo Weekend"	Hideaki Sunaga	3:56
6.	"Milestone"	Masaki Ohkita	3:07
7.	"Masayume Chasing"	Ninomiya	3:41
8.	"The Shadow"	Kwon Soon-wook	3:22
9.	"Tail of Hope"	Toshiyuki Suzuki	3:22
10.	"First Time (making clip and interview)"	Kenta Tanoue

== Charts ==
=== Weekly charts ===
Chart (2014)	Peak position
Japanese Albums (Oricon)	7
South Korean Albums (Gaon)	19
South Korean Int'l Albums (Gaon)	3
Taiwanese Albums (G-Music)	13
Taiwanese J-pop Albums (G-Music)	1

== Sales ==
Region	Certification	Certified units/sales
Japan	—	17,355
South Korea	—	600

== Release history ==
Region	Date	Format	Distributing Label	Catalogue codes
Japan	September 3, 2014	CD, CD/DVD, digital download	Avex Trax	AVCK-79214B, AVCK-79215
South Korea	September 3, 2014	digital download	S.M. Entertainment	
Taiwan	September 26, 2014	CD, CD/DVD	Avex Taiwan	
South Korea	October 1, 2014	CD	S.M. Entertainment	2461970
