= List of awards and nominations received by BoA =

BoA awards and nominations
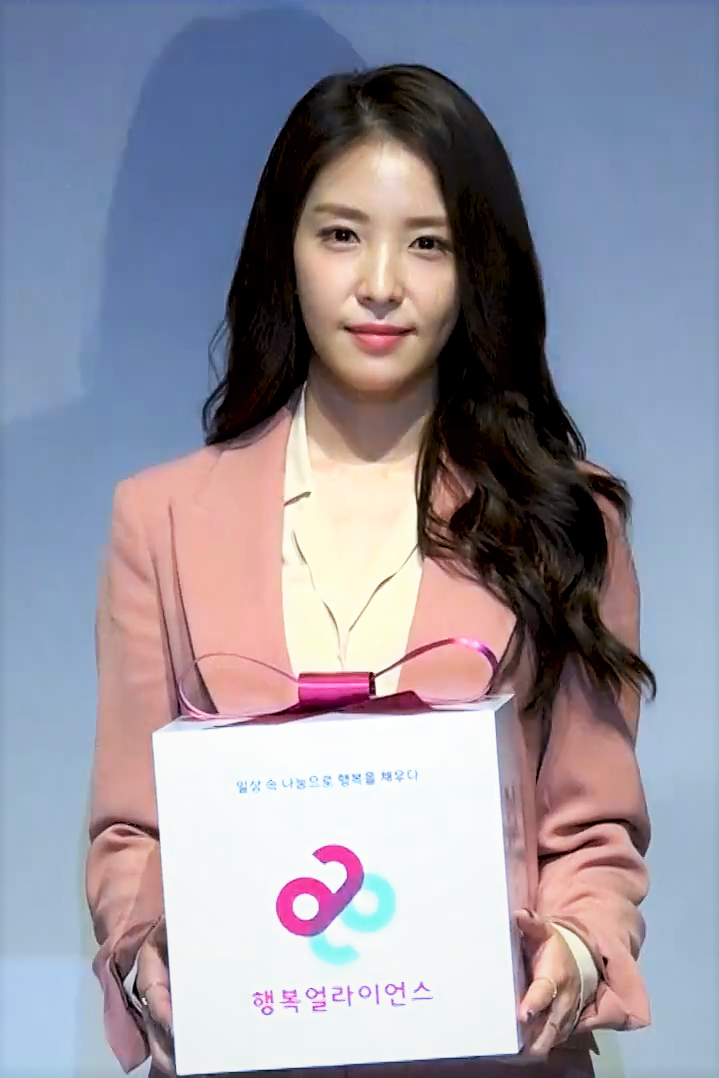
- BoA in April 2018
Awards and nominations
Award	Wins	Nominations
Golden Disc	1	1
Japan Gold Disc	5	5
MAMA	8	18
MTV Asia	2	2
Seoul Music	4	4
World Music	1	1
Best Hits Song Festival	6	6
Billboard Japan Music Awards	1	1
Japan Record Awards	5	5
KBS Drama Awards	1	1
KMTV Music Award	5	5
Korea Drama Awards	1	1
Korean Music Awards	0	2
MBC Gayo Daejejeon	3	3
MTV Video Music Awards Japan	1	4
SBS Entertainment Awards	1	1
SBS Gayo Daejeon	6	6

Totals (Note: Certain award groups do not simply award one winner. They acknowledge several different recipients, have runners-up, and have third place. Since this is a specific recognition and is different from losing an award, runner-up mentions are considered wins in this award tally. For simplification and to avoid errors, each award in this list has been presumed to have had a prior nomination.)
- Wins: 62
- Nominations: 78

This is a list of awards and other recognitions earned by South Korean singer BoA.

== Awards and nominations ==
Name of the award ceremony, year presented, award category, nominee of the award and the result of the nomination
Award ceremony	Year	Category	Nominee / work	Result	Ref.
Best Hits Song Festival	2002	Gold Artist Award	BoA	Won	
Best Hits Song Festival	2003	Gold Artist Award	BoA	Won	
Best Hits Song Festival	2004	Gold Artist Award	BoA	Won	
Best Hits Song Festival	2005	Gold Artist Award	BoA	Won	
Best Hits Song Festival	2006	Gold Artist Award	BoA	Won	
Best Hits Song Festival	2007	Gold Artist Award	BoA	Won	
Billboard Japan Music Awards	2009	U.S. Billboard Publisher's Award	BoA	Won	
Golden Disc Awards	2010	Album Bonsang	Hurricane Venus	Won	
Golden Disc Awards	2010	Album Daesang	Hurricane Venus	Nominated	
Japan Gold Disc Awards	2003	Rock & Pop Album of the Year	Listen To My Heart	Won	
Japan Gold Disc Awards	2003	Rock & Pop Album of the Year	Valenti	Won	
Japan Gold Disc Awards	2004	Music Videos of The Year	8 Films & More	Won	
Japan Gold Disc Awards	2005	Rock & Pop Album of the Year	Love & Honesty	Won	
Japan Gold Disc Awards	2006	Rock & Pop Album of the Year	Best of Soul	Won	
Japan Record Awards	2002	Gold Prize	"Listen To My Heart"	Won	
Japan Record Awards	2003	Gold Prize	"Double"	Won	
Japan Record Awards	2004	Gold Prize	"Quincy"	Won	
Japan Record Awards	2006	Gold Prize	"Winter Love"	Won	
Japan Record Awards	2007	Gold Prize	"Love Letter"	Won	
KBS Drama Awards	2013	Excellence Award, Actress in a Drama Special	Waiting for Love	Won	
KMTV Music Awards	2000	Rookie of the Year	BoA	Won	
KMTV Music Awards	2002	Bonsang	BoA	Won	
KMTV Music Awards	2002	Mobile Music Award	BoA	Won	
KMTV Music Awards	2003	Special Honor	BoA	Won	
KMTV Music Awards	2003	Bonsang	BoA	Won	
Korea Culture and Arts Awards	2007	Today's Young Artist Award – Popular Music	BoA	Won	
Korea Drama Awards	2013	Best New Actress	Waiting for Love	Won	
Korea Entertainment Arts Awards	2003	New Generation Singer Award	BoA	Won	
Korea Entertainment Arts Awards	2004	New Generation Singer Award	BoA	Won	
Korea Entertainment Arts Awards	2005	Hallyu All-Star Award	BoA	Won	
Korea Entertainment Arts Awards	2007	Overseas Popularity Award	BoA	Won	
Korea Entertainment Arts Awards	2008	Overseas Popularity Award	BoA	Won	
Korean Music Awards	2005	Best Female Artist	My Name	Nominated	
Korean Music Awards	2019	Best Pop Album	Woman	Nominated	
Korean Music Awards	2022	Best K-pop Album	Better	Nominated	
Korea National Assembly Awards	2003	Grand Prize	BoA	Won	
MBC Gayo Daejejeon	2002	Top 10 Singer	BoA	Won	
MBC Gayo Daejejeon	2003	Top 10 Singer	BoA	Won	
MBC Gayo Daejejeon	2004	Top 10 Singer	BoA	Won	
Mnet Asian Music Awards	2000	Best New Female Artist	"ID; Peace B"	Won	
Mnet Asian Music Awards	2002	Most Popular Music Video (Daesang)	"No. 1"	Won	
Mnet Asian Music Awards	2002	Best Dance Performance	"No. 1"	Won	
Mnet Asian Music Awards	2002	Best Female Artist	"No. 1"	Nominated	
Mnet Asian Music Awards	2003	Best Dance Performance	"Atlantis Princess"	Won	
Mnet Asian Music Awards	2003	Best Female Artist	"Atlantis Princess"	Nominated	
Mnet Asian Music Awards	2004	Music Video of the Year (Daesang)	"My Name"	Won	
Mnet Asian Music Awards	2004	Best Female Video	"My Name"	Nominated	
Mnet Asian Music Awards	2004	Best Dance Video	"My Name"	Nominated	
Mnet Asian Music Awards	2005	Best Female Artist	"Girls on Top"	Won	
Mnet Asian Music Awards	2005	Best Dance Performance	"Girls on Top"	Nominated	
Mnet Asian Music Awards	2010	Album of the Year (Daesang)	Hurricane Venus	Nominated	
Mnet Asian Music Awards	2010	Best Female Artist	"Hurricane Venus"	Won	
Mnet Asian Music Awards	2012	Best Female Artist	"Only One"	Nominated	
Mnet Asian Music Awards	2012	Best Solo Dance Performance	"Only One"	Nominated	
Mnet Asian Music Awards	2015	Best Female Artist	"Kiss My Lips"	Nominated	
Mnet Asian Music Awards	2016	Best Collaboration	"No Matter What" (with Beenzino)	Nominated	
Mnet Asian Music Awards	2020	Inspired Achievement Award	BoA	Won	
MTV Asia Awards	2004	Favorite Korean Artist	BoA	Won	
MTV Asia Awards	2004	Most Influential Artist	BoA	Won	
MTV Video Music Awards Japan	2002	Best New Artist	BoA	Nominated	
MTV Video Music Awards Japan	2003	Best Pop Video	"Valenti"	Nominated	
MTV Video Music Awards Japan	2004	Best Dance Video	"Double"	Won	
MTV Video Music Awards Japan	2004	Best Female Video	"Double"	Nominated	
SBS Entertainment Awards	2012	Special Award	K-pop Star	Won	
SBS Gayo Daejeon	2002	Grand Prize (Daesang)	BoA	Won	
SBS Gayo Daejeon	2002	Bonsang	BoA	Won	
SBS Gayo Daejeon	2003	Bonsang	BoA	Won	
SBS Gayo Daejeon	2004	Bonsang	BoA	Won	
SBS Gayo Daejeon	2004	Most Popular Artist	BoA	Won	
SBS Gayo Daejeon	2005	Bonsang	BoA	Won	
Seoul Music Awards	2002	Grand Prize (Daesang)	BoA	Won	
Seoul Music Awards	2002	Bonsang	BoA	Won	
Seoul Music Awards	2015	Record of the Year	Kiss My Lips	Won	
Seoul Music Awards	2023	Legend Artist	BoA	Won	
World Music Awards	2005	Best-Selling Korean Artist	BoA	Won	
World Cultural Industry Forum Awards	2020	Achievement Award	BoA	Won	

== Other accolades ==
=== State and cultural honors ===
Name of country or organization, year given and name of honor or award
Country or organization	Year	Honor/Award	Ref.
South Korea (Note: Awarded at the Korean Popular Culture and Arts Awards, organized by the Korea Creative Content Agency and hosted by the South Korean Ministry of Culture, Sports and Tourism. Commendations are given to individuals or groups for their contribution to popular culture in South Korea and abroad.)	2016	Presidential Commendation	
Ministry of Culture, Sports and Tourism	2004	Asian Cultural Exchange Merit Award	
Newsis K-Expo Cultural Awards (Note: Co-sponsored by Korea's Ministry of Culture, Sports and Tourism, Ministry of Trade, Industry, and Energy, Korea Communications Commission, and Korea Creative Content Agency, it awards cultural icons and businesses who have contributed greatly to Hallyu, the Korean wave.)	2020	Minister of Culture, Sports and Tourism Award	

=== Listicles ===
Name of publisher, year listed, name of listicle and placement
Publisher	Year	Listicle	Placement	Ref.
The Dong-a Ilbo	2016	Best Female Artists According to Experts	5th	
Forbes	2018	Korea Power Celebrity	35th	
Golden Disc Awards	2025	Golden Disc Powerhouse 40	Placed	
IZM	2025	The 25 Greatest Musicians of the first 25 Years of the 21st Century	Included	
Korea Federation of Copyright Societies (Note: The Korea Federation of Copyright Societies is an association that consists of 10 organizations, including the Korea Music Copyright Association (KOMCA), the Korean Music Performers Association, the Korean Broadcasting Writers Association, and the Korea Press Foundation, and has a total of 300,000 members.)	2023	Korea World Music Culture Hall of Fame ("No. 1")	Inducted	
Mnet	2013	Legend 100 Artists	46th	
