= Message / Call My Name =

Single by BoA
- Released: October 23, 2013
- Recorded: 2013
- Genre: R&B
- Length: 13:24
- Label: Avex Trax
- Songwriter(s): Kanata Okajima & Sara Sakurai
- Producer(s): Max Matsuura, Soo-Man Lee

BoA singles chronology
"Tail of Hope" (2013)	"Message / Call My Name" (2013)	"Shout It Out" (2014)

"Message / Call My Name" is BoA's 34th Japanese single which was released on October 23, 2013. The title track, Message, was used as the main theme song for BeeTV's drama "Seikan☆Love Message"

== Music video ==
The short version of the music video was revealed via avex's official YouTube channel on October 4, 2013. The Music Video took place at The Botanical Garden BCJ (Byeokchoji) and was directed by METAOLOZ (BoA's brother) who previously worked for BoA's Korean music video such as Only One, The Shadow and "Disturbance". Actor Song Jae-rim was also featured in the music video.

There was a message in the music video that stated "I am always waiting for you"

== Special promotion ==
Just like the previous singles Only One and Tail of Hope, Message also had a special promotion as a campaign. The campaign was called "Message from BoA "Juke Bus", which a group of orchestral musicians called "gaQdan" played BoA's songs in orchestral version in an open bus. The songs which were played include: Message, Meri Kuri, Winter Love and Jewel Song. The bus ran around Shibuya and Omotesando area, also at SMTown Tokyo Special Edition venue, Tokyo Dome, on the day of the concerts which were held 2 days before the single release.

The video of the Juke Bus can be found on the special website called Message from BoA.

== Track listing ==
=== CD single ===
1. "Message"
2. "Call My Name"
3. "Message" (Instrumental)
4. "Call My Name" (Instrumental)

=== DVD ===
1. "Message" (Music Video)
2. "Message" (making of)

== Chart performance ==
Release	Chart	Peak position	Sales total
October 23, 2013	Oricon Daily Singles Chart	8	
October 23, 2013	Oricon Weekly Singles Chart	13	6,982
October 23, 2013	Billboard Japan Hot 100	-	

== Personnel ==
Personnel details were sourced from the liner notes booklet of "Message / Call My Name".

- BoA – vocals
- Nermin Harambasic – arrangement (#2, #4), composition (#2, #4)
- Ko Mi-young – make-up
- Kwon Soon-wook – music video "Message" director
- Erik Lidbom – arrangement (#1, #3), composition (#1, #3)
- Metaoloz Creative Group – music video "Message" production
- Yuta Nakano – arrangement (#2, #4), composition (#2, #4)
- Satsuki Naono – creative coordination
- Andreas Oberg – composition (#1, #3), guitar (#1, #3)
- Kanata Okajima – lyrics (#1)
- Tsutomu Ono – photography
- Sara Sakurai – lyrics (#2)
- Seo Han-young – styling
- Shin Yun-seo – hair
- Ronny Svendsen – arrangement (#2, #4), composition (#2, #4)
- Koji Wagatsuma – art direction, design
- Anne Judith Wik – arrangement (#2, #4), composition (#2, #4)
