= One Shot, Two Shot =

EP by BoA
- Released: February 20, 2018
- Recorded: 2017–2018
- Studio: SM Studios, Seoul
- Genre: R&B; trap; hip-hop; deep house; synth-pop
- Length: 27:45
- Language: Korean
- Label: SM
- Producer: Grades; The Stereotypes; Harvey Mason Jr.; Josh Cumbee; Devine Channel; Yoo Young-jin; Sara Forsberg; Micah Powell; Tayla Parx

BoA chronology
Watashi Kono Mama de Ii no Kana (2018)	One Shot, Two Shot (2018)	Woman (2018)

Singles from One Shot, Two Shot
- 1. "Camo" Released: June 26, 2017; 2. "Nega Dola" Released: January 31, 2018; 3. "One Shot, Two Shot" Released: February 20, 2018

One Shot, Two Shot is the first Korean extended play by South Korean singer-songwriter BoA. Released digitally on February 20, 2018, by her native label SM Entertainment with Iriver as the distributor, the extended play is the singer's first major Korean release in nearly three years since her eighth Korean studio album Kiss My Lips (2015), and subsequently her second major release in 2018 just one week after releasing Watashi Kono Mama de li no Kana, her first Japanese album in over four years also.

== Composition ==
Featuring seven new tracks that center around the singer's "alternate perspectives and approaches to matured romance", the extended play incorporates "heavy-bass" deep house and EDM genres, while seeing BoA exploring herself in new genres, such as trap and hip-hop. Wanting to "breathe some freshness" into her discography, the singer went on to collaborate with rapper Junoflo and producer Chancellor, whom also contributed lyrically and musically to the extended play along with several other producers, such as Yoo Young-jin, Devine Channel, Josh Cumbee, Tayla Parx, Micah Powell, Mike Daley, Mitchell Owens, Harvey Mason Jr., The Stereotypes, and more.

== Reception ==
Upon its release, One Shot, Two Shot received positive reviews from critics, whom regarded the extended play as one of her best releases, further praising its mature sound comparing to her previous release. It was, however, a moderate commercial success in her native country, becoming her fifth top-ten entry on the Gaon Album Chart, as well as her second top-ten entry on the Billboard World Albums chart. To further promote the extended play, three singles were released in between 2017 and 2018; namely "Camo", "Nega Dola", and the titular "One Shot, Two Shot".

== Track listing ==
No.	Title	Lyrics	Music	Arrangement	Length
1.	"One Shot, Two Shot"	BoA	Grades; Caroline Ailin; Sophia Pae	Grades	3:31
2.	"Everybody Knows"	Yoo Young-jin	Yoo Young-jin; Devine Channel; Ryan Henderson; Richard Beynon; Aurora Pfeiffer; Lena Leon	Yoo Young-jin; Devine Channel; Ryan Henderson; Richard Beynon	3:36
3.	"Nega Dola (내가 돌아)"	JQ; Kang Eun-yoo; On-gyul; Hyun Ji-won; BoA	Afshin Salmani; Josh Cumbee; Sara Forsberg; Yoo Young-jin	AFSHeeN; Josh Cumbee	2:56
4.	"Your Song" (featuring Junoflo)	JQ; Seolim (Makeumine Works)	Micah Powell; Tayla Parx; TK; Devine Channel; Junoflo	Micah Powell	3:32
5.	"Recollection"	BoA	BoA; Mike Daley; Rodnae 'Chikk' Bell; Mitchell Owens	Mike Daley; Mitchell Owens	3:38
6.	"Always, All Ways" (featuring Chancellor)	Jam Factory	The Stereotypes; Kam Parker; Rose	The Stereotypes	3:42
7.	"Camo"	Cho Yoon-kyung	Harvey Mason Jr.; Britt Burton; Kevin Randolph	Harvey Mason Jr.; Kevin Randolph	3:19
8.	"One Shot, Two Shot" (instrumental)		Grades; Caroline Ailin; Sophia Pae	Grades	3:31
Total length:					27:45

== Charts ==
Chart (2018)	Peak position
South Korean Albums (Gaon)	6
US World Albums (Billboard)	7

== Sales ==
Region	Sales
South Korea (Gaon)	9,628

== Release history ==
Region	Date	Format	Label
Worldwide	February 20, 2018	Digital download	SM Entertainment
South Korea	February 20, 2018	Digital download	SM Entertainment, iRiver
South Korea	February 21, 2018	CD	SM Entertainment, iRiver
