= Masayume Chasing =

- Physical edition artwork

Single by BoA

from the album Who's Back?
- B-side: "Fun"
- Released: July 23, 2014
- Recorded: 2014
- Genre: J-pop
- Length: 3:39
- Label: Avex Trax
- Songwriter(s): Junji Ishiwatari
- Producer(s): Steven Lee; Caroline Gustavsson

BoA singles chronology
"Shout It Out" (2014)	"Masayume Chasing" (2014)	"First Time" (2014)

"Masayume Chasing" is the 37th Japanese single by South Korean singer, songwriter, and dancer BoA. It was released on July 23, 2014, as one of several singles from her eighth Japanese-language studio album, Who's Back? (2014) through Avex Trax. The CD single contains the B-side track "Fun", and was released in six physical editions: two CD+DVD editions, a CD-only edition, a CD-only Fairy Tail edition, and two limited USB editions only sold on BoA's official fan club shop.

Commercially, "Masayume Chasing" performed modestly in Japan, peaking at number 15 on the weekly Oricon Singles Chart and number 27 on the Billboard Japan Hot 100. In South Korea, the song entered the Gaon international singles chart at number 54. The title track was used as the opening theme for part of season 7 of the anime Fairy Tail, which was broadcast from April 2014 until December 2015.

== Background and release ==
On June 10, 2014, BoA posted three single cover images to her social media accounts for her upcoming Japanese single, with the caption "Masayume Chasing coming on July 23". The artwork of the single covers were noted for its summer vibe, accompanying the "cheerful" production of the song. On June 16, she posted a video to her Instagram account showing her in the studio recording and preparing for the single's release. It marked BoA's second Japanese CD single release in 2014, following "Shout it Out", which was released in March.

The physical release was issued in six versions: two CD+DVD editions, a CD-only edition, a CD-only Fairy Tail edition, and two limited USB editions only sold on BoA's official fan club shop, SOUL Shop. Both USB editions have 4GB of storage and contain four songs in WAV format. Both CD+DVD editions come with an application postcard and the CD-only edition comes with an entry ticket to obtain a special DVD with the video "Masayume Chasing ~Limited Making~". The title track was used as the opening theme for the anime Fairy Tail.

== Reception ==
Bradley Stern from MuuMuse wrote that the "pop princess has consistently supplied sparkling cuts in time for summer for well over a decade now — from 2002's 'Valenti' all the way up to last year's 'Tail Of Hope.' He added that "Masayume Chasing"'s "uptempo synth-pop gem is both a club banger and a super-saccharine J-pop smash ... complete with a surging chorus and some feisty chants." Commercially, "Masayume Chasing" performed modestly, peaking at number 8 on the daily Oricon Singles Chart, and number 15 on its weekly counterpart. On the Billboard Japan Hot 100, the track peaked at number 27.

== Track listing ==
CD single

1. "Masayume Chasing" - 3:39
2. "Fun" - 4:03
3. "Masayume Chasing" (Instrumental)" - 3:39
4. "Fun" (Instrumental)" - 4:03

DVD (Edition A)

1. "Masayume Chasing" music video

DVD (Edition B)

1. "Masayume Chasing" music video (Dance ver.)
2. "Masayume Chasing" making video

== Charts ==
Chart (2014)	Peak position
Japan (Oricon)	15
Japan (Japan Hot 100)	27
South Korea International (Gaon)	54
