= Kiss My Lips =

Studio album by BoA
- Released: May 12, 2015
- Recorded: 2014–2015
- Genres: K-pop; ballad; dance; R&B; soul
- Length: 45:19
- Language: Korean
- Labels: SM; KT Music
- Producers: BoA; Lee Soo-man (exec.)

BoA chronology
Who's Back? (2014)	Kiss My Lips (2015)	Watashi Kono Mama de Ii no Kana (2018)

Singles from Kiss My Lips
- 1. "Who Are You" Released: May 6, 2015; 2. "Kiss My Lips" Released: May 12, 2015

Kiss My Lips is the eighth Korean-language studio album (seventeenth overall) by South Korean singer BoA. It was released digitally on May 12, 2015, and physically a day later by SM Entertainment, and distributed by KT Music. The album features twelve tracks in total, including two singles; "Who Are You" and the title track. The self-produced record (for celebrating the fifteenth anniversary of BoA's debut) is her first Korean full-length release since Only One (2012).

== Release and promotion ==
On May 8, the album's track listing was revealed online, and an image teaser video for the lead single came out via SM Entertainment's official YouTube channel the following day. Commercials for the album aired from May 11 until 17. On May 12, the whole album was released with an official music video for the title track.

BoA began promoting her comeback album on various music programs, starting on Music Bank aired on May 15, 2015. Along with the lead single, she performed "Fox" on Music Bank, "Green Light" on Show! Music Core, and "Smash" on Inkigayo. On KBS's You Hee-yeol's Sketchbook, BoA performed the album's two lead singles and "Double Jack", along with her previous hits "My Name" and "No. 1". She also covered "Billie Jean" by Michael Jackson, who the singer stated was particularly her role model. Promotions for the album was wrapped up by BoA's performance on Inkigayo aired on May 31, 2015.

== Singles ==
=== "Who Are You" ===
The album's pre-release single "Who Are You", written by BoA herself, is an electronic dance-pop tune with sounds of guitar and bass. Featuring a rap by Gaeko from hip-hop twosome Dynamic Duo, the lyrics of the self-penned song expresses excitement of a man and woman until meeting each other on a blind date. The single was released on May 6, 2015, with its accompanying music video.

The singer's labelmate Sehun (from Exo) and actress Kim Hyun-ji co-starred in the music video as blind date partners. The music video shows varied places and props, and also sensory images mixing reality and fantasy through a lot of CG-based special effects. Commercially, "Who Are You" reached number three on the Gaon Digital Chart, and has sold over 566,000 digital copies in South Korea.

=== "Kiss My Lips" ===
The self-composed title track "Kiss My Lips" is a minimal pop song incorporated with unique synthesizer riffs and sound. Emphasizing her deep voice, BoA's vocals redouble the single's dreamlike atmosphere. In the song's lyrics, the speaker provocatively urges her counterpart not to hesitate about coming up to her.

The single was released on May 12, 2015, the same day as the album's release. Its corresponding music video was directed by the singer's elder brother Kwon Soon-wook, who also directed the video for the album's pre-release track. (Note: Kwon has previously directed some of the music videos for BoA's singles such as "Game", "Only One", and "Disturbance".) Commercially, "Kiss My Lips" peaked at number eighteen on the Gaon Digital Chart and has sold nearly 128,000 digital copies domestically.

== Reception ==
Professional ratings
Review scores
Source	Rating
Billboard	4/5 stars
IZM	4/5 stars

Upon its release, Kiss My Lips debuted at number five on the Gaon Weekly Albums Chart. The album also entered Billboard's World Albums Chart on the issue date of May 30, 2015, debuting at number six. It sold 15,234 copies in South Korea and over 1,000 copies in Japan by the end of the year. IZM ranked it among the 10 best albums of 2015 and Idolator ranked it number 13 in their list of the 25 best K-pop songs of 2015.

Awards and nominations
Year	Organization	Award	Result	Ref.
2015	Mnet Asian Music Awards	Best Female Artist	Nominated	
2016	Seoul Music Awards	Record of the Year	Won	

== Track listing ==
All lyrics are written by BoA, except where noted; all music is composed by BoA, except where noted.

Kiss My Lips track listing
No.	Title	Lyrics	Music	Length
1.	"Kiss My Lips"		BoA; Jonathan Yip; Jeremy Reeves; Ray Romulus; Ray McCullough	3:46
2.	"Who Are You" (featuring Gaeko of Dynamic Duo)	BoA; Gaeko		3:44
3.	"Smash"		BoA; Kim Tae-sung; Jake K; Andreas Öberg	2:34
4.	"Shattered"		BoA; The Underdogs; Mike Daley; Andrew Hey; Tiffany Fred	3:56
5.	"Fox"			3:59
6.	"Double Jack" (featuring Eddy Kim)		BoA; ZigZag Note	3:48
7.	"Home"		BoA; The Underdogs; Patrick "J. Que" Smith; Fred; Dewain Whitmore)	3:38
8.	"Clockwork"			3:56
9.	"Love and Hate"		BoA; Kim Tae-sung; Oberg	4:03
10.	"Green Light"			4:01
11.	"Hello"			4:22
12.	"Blah"			3:39
Total length:				45:19

Notes

- According to the album's booklet, the original title of track 1 was "Soft Lips".

== Charts ==
=== Weekly charts ===
Kiss My Lips weekly chart performance
Chart (2015)	Peak position
Japanese Albums (Oricon)	147
South Korean Albums (Gaon)	5
US World Albums (Billboard)	6

=== Monthly charts ===
Kiss My Lips monthly chart performance
Chart (May 2015)	Peak position
South Korean Albums (Gaon)	8

=== Year-end charts ===
Kiss My Lips year-end chart performance
Chart (2015)	Peak position
South Korean Albums (Gaon)	99

== Release history ==
Release dates and formats for Kiss My Lips
Region	Date	Format	Label	Ref.
South Korea	May 12, 2015	Digital download	SM Entertainment; KT Music	
Various	May 12, 2015	Digital download	SM Entertainment	
South Korea	May 13, 2015	CD	SM Entertainment; KT Music	

== See also ==
- List of K-pop on the Billboard charts
