= Woman (BoA album) =

- Digital cover

Studio album by BoA
- Released: October 24, 2018
- Recorded: 2018
- Genre: K-pop
- Length: 33:57
- Label: SM

BoA chronology
| One Shot, Two Shot (2018) | Woman (2018) | Starry Night (2019) |

Singles from Woman
- 1. "Woman" Released: October 24, 2018

Music video
- "Woman" on YouTube

Woman is the ninth Korean-language studio album (nineteenth overall) by South Korean singer-songwriter BoA. It was released on October 24, 2018, by SM Entertainment, with distribution by iRiver. The album features ten tracks in total, including the lead single, which shares the same name as the title of the album. The album is BoA's first Korean full-length release since Kiss My Lips (2015).

== Background and release ==
On October 16, 2018, it was reported that BoA would be making a comeback on October 24. On the same day, SM Entertainment started post a series of teasers for the album on their official SNS accounts.

On October 23, the album's track list was revealed through a "highlight medley", with 6 out of 10 songs written by BoA. The album was released on October 24, 2018, through several music portals, including Melon and iTunes. Analyzing the title track's thematic concept, an editor from Rolling Stone India wrote:

"The record ideates Boa’s perception of a 'real woman' and condemns the practice of making women compete against each other. The singer out-and-out embraces her womanhood and inspires other women to do so as well by urging them to be comfortable in their own skin and set their own standards for themselves. The music video further emphasises this point, exhibiting a diverse group of women from different ages, sizes and racial groups."

== Reception ==
The "upside-down walk" in the title track's choreography garnered attention following the album's release.

The accompanying choreography for the title track went viral following the record's release for the "upside-down walk" that was utilized in the introduction. Woman additionally received a nomination for Best Pop Album at the 16th Korean Music Awards in 2019. Refinery29 ranked it the 5th best K-pop album of 2018 and Rolling Stone India included the title track in their list of the 10 greatest feminist songs in K-pop.

== Track listing ==
| No. | Title | Lyrics | Music | Arrangement | Length |
|---|---|---|---|---|---|
| 1. | "Woman" | BoA | Jon Hume; Hookman; Ivy Adara | Jon Hume | 2:50 |
| 2. | "Like It!" | Seo Ji-eum | Caesar & Loui; Deez; Yiva Dimberg | Caesar & Loui | 3:26 |
| 3. | "Irreversible" | BoA | BoA | Shaun Kim; Stainboys | 3:39 |
| 4. | "Encounter" | BoA | Shaylen Carroll; Joshua Chery; Malachi Cohen; Corry Nitta; MZMC | Corry Nitta | 3:30 |
| 5. | "Little More" | BoA | BoA; Shaun Kim; Brian Cho | BoA; Shaun Kim; Brian Cho | 3:57 |
| 6. | "U&I" | Sumin; Jinbo | Joy Neil Mitro Deb; Linnea Mary Han Deb; Jinbo; Sumin; Anton Hård af Segerstad; Micah Premnath; Steven Berghuijs; Jeroen Kerstens | Joy Neil Mitro Deb; Linnea Mary Han Deb; Anton Hard Af Segerstad | 3:02 |
| 7. | "If" | BoA | BoA; Stainboys | BoA; Stainboys | 3:16 |
| 8. | "No Limit" | BoA | BoA; Shaun Kim; Stainboys | BoA; Shaun Kim; Stainboys | 3:27 |
| 9. | "Good Love" | Kenzie | Jamil "Digi" Chammas; Kenzie; Adrian McKinnon; MZMC | Jamil "Digi" Chammas | 3:12 |
| 10. | "I Want You Back" | JQ; Makeumine Works | Sonny J Mason Osuji; Karen Poole | Sonny J Mason Osuji | 3:38 |
| Total length: | | | | | 33:57 |

== Charts ==
Weekly charts
| Chart (2018) | Peak position |
|---|---|
| South Korean Albums (Gaon) | 6 |
