= One Dream =

Promotional single by BoA, Henry, Key
- Released: March 18, 2012
- Recorded: SM Studios (Seoul)
- Genre: K-pop
- Length: 2:28
- Label: SM Entertainment
- Songwriters: Toby Gad, Palo Alto, Marty James and Lyrica Anderson
- Producer: Toby Gad

"One Dream" is a Korean-language song performed by South Korean pop singer BoA. It features Henry of Super Junior-M and Key of Shinee. The song was used as the theme song for the reality series K-pop Star and included in BoA's fifteenth album Only One.

== Production and release ==
"One Dream" was produced by Toby Gad, who along with Paloalto, Marty James and Lyrica Anderson also composed the song. The song was used as the theme song for the finals of K-pop Star, a variety TV competition series broadcast by SBS, on which BoA herself was a judge. On March 18, 2012, the song was released as a digital single and peaked at number 24 on the weekly Gaon Digital Chart. "One Dream" was later included on BoA's fifteenth studio album Only One, released on July 22. The song re-entered the weekly charts and landed at number 34.

== Chart performance ==
Chart performance for "One Dream"
Chart (2012)	Peak position
South Korea (Gaon)	34
South Korea (K-Pop Hot 100)	51
