= Watashi Kono Mama de Ii no Kana =

2018 J-pop album by BoA

Watashi Kono Mama de li no Kana
- Digital and CD+DVD 2 version cover

Studio album by BoA
- Released: February 14, 2018
- Recorded: 2017–2018
- Genre: J-pop; R&B
- Length: 45:02
- Label: Avex Trax

BoA chronology
Kiss My Lips (2015)	Watashi Kono Mama de li no Kana (2018)	One Shot, Two Shot (2018)

Singles from Watashi Kono Mama de li no Kana
- 1. "Fly" Released: December 3, 2014; 2. "Lookbook" Released: December 16, 2015; 3. "Jazzclub" Released: December 25, 2017; 4. "Watashi Kono Mama de li no Kana" Released: February 14, 2018

Watashi Kono Mama de li no Kana (私このままでいいのかな; Am I Okay Like This?) is the eighteenth overall studio album and ninth Japanese studio album by South Korean singer BoA. It was released by Avex Trax on February 14, 2018, in three versions. Commercially, the album peaked at number 13 on the Oricon Album Chart and at number 11 on the Billboard Japan Hot Albums chart.

== Release ==
The album was released on February 14, 2018, in three versions: CD, two CD+DVD, and as a digital download. Watashi Kono Mama de li no Kana (私このままでいいのかな) is BoA's first studio album with a title in Japanese, which translates to "Am I okay like this" in English.

=== Singles ===
The release of Watashi Kono Mama de li no Kana was preceded by several digital singles, including with "Fly" in December 2014, "Lookbook" one year later, "Make Me Complete" in January 2016 and "Jazzclub" in December 2017.

"Jazzclub" was first heard at the "BoA The Live in Billboard Live" concert held in Osaka in May 2017. The song's music video—filmed in New York City—was uploaded to SMTown's YouTube channel on December 24, 2017, and was subsequently released for digital download via Japanese music sites on January 24, 2018. The track "Watashi Kono Mama de li no Kana" was released simultaneously with the release of the album on February 14.

== Commercial performance ==
The album debuted and peaked at number 13 on the Oricon Albums Chart for the week of February 18, 2018. In its second week, the album fell to number 50. It also debuted and peaked at number 11 on Billboard Japan's Hot Albums for the week of February 26, 2018, placing at number 10 on Top Albums with 6,574 copies sold, and at number 20 on Top Download Albums. In its second week, the album fell to number 48 with 1,124 additional copies sold.

== Track listing ==
Watashi Kono Mama de Ii no Kana track listing
No.	Title	Lyrics	Music	Length
1.	"Where Am I Now"	Sara Sakurai	Tim Hawes; Obi Mhondera; Dawn Elektra	3:33
2.	"Arigatō Sayonara" (ありがとうサヨナラ)	Sara Sakurai	Ricky Hanley; Rob Derbyshire; Dawn Elektra	3:22
3.	"Crow"	Sara Sakurai	Christian Fast; Maria Marcus; Marcus Lindberg	3:43
4.	"Jazzclub"	Sara Sakurai	Albi Albertsson; Henk Jan Kooistra; Jochem Fluitsma; Rik Anema; Erik Van Tijn	2:50
5.	"Fly"	BoA	BoA	4:27
6.	"Right Here, Right Everywhere"	Tanaka Hidenori	DWB; Rike Boomgaarden	3:47
7.	"Manhattan Tango"	Sara Sakurai	Andreas Carlsson; Jeff Miyahara; Karl Johan Rasmark	3:29
8.	"Make Me Complete"	Jeff Miyahara	Caroline Gustavsson; Takarot	4:38
9.	"Lookbook"	Kanata Okajima	Andreas Oberg; Johan Becker; Tahiti Lenoni; Maria Marcus	3:21
10.	"Mannish Chocolat"	Sara Sakurai	Andreas Oberg; Skylar Mones; Michele Angel Wylen	3:18
11.	"Kiss My Lips"	BoA	BoA; Jonathan Yip; Jeremy Reeves; Ray Romulus; Ray McCullough	3:46
12.	"Watashi Kono Mama de li no Kana" (私このままでいいのかな)	Ishiwatari Jyunji	Andreas Stone Johansson; Steven Lee; Soma Genda; Allison Kaplan	4:48
Total length:				45:02

DVD ver. 1
No.	Title	Length
1.	"Jazzclub" (music clip)
2.	"Fly" (music clip)
3.	"Lookbook" (music clip)
4.	"Kiss My Lips" (music clip)
5.	"Documentary of "Jazzclub""

DVD ver. 2 – BoA the Live in Billboard Live Section
No.	Title	Length
1.	"Jazzclub"
2.	"Kono Yo no Shirushi / Do the Motion / Make a Secret" (medley)
3.	"Jewel Song"

== Charts ==
=== Weekly charts ===
Weekly chart performance
Chart (2018)	Peak position
Japanese Albums (Oricon)	13
Japanese Hot Albums (Billboard Japan)	11

=== Monthly charts ===
Monthly chart performance
Chart (February 2018)	Peak position
Japanese Albums (Oricon)	32

== Release history ==
Release dates and formats
Region	Date	Format(s)	Edition	Label	Ref.
Various	February 14, 2018	Digital download; streaming	Regular Edition	Avex Trax	
Japan	February 14, 2018	CD	Regular Edition	Avex Trax	
Japan	February 14, 2018	CD + DVD	Limited Edition	Avex Trax	
