= Hakui no Namida =

- Starring: Miki Mizuno; Masaru Nagai
- Opening theme: "Tail of Hope" by BoA
- Ending theme: "Nanairo" by Ryuichi Kawamura
- Country of origin: Japan
- Original language: Japanese

Original release
- Release: April 1, 2013 – present

Hakui no Namida (白衣のなみだ) is a Japanese television drama series.

== Cast ==
- Miki Mizuno
- Masaru Nagai
