= Woo Weekend =

Single by BoA
- B-side: "No Dance, No Life"
- Released: July 21, 2010
- Recorded: 2010
- Genre: Dance-pop
- Length: 3:54
- Label: Avex Trax

BoA singles chronology
"Energetic" (2010)	"Woo Weekend" (2010)	"I See Me" (2010)

Alternative covers

"Woo Weekend" is the thirtieth single by BoA, released on July 21, 2010. It was released in a normal CD-only edition and a limited CD+DVD edition. The B-Side to the song is "No Dance, No Life". "Woo Weekend" was used as the theme song for Japan's Disney on Ice 25th anniversary, as well as was used in a commercial promoting it.

== Track listing ==
CD
No.	Title	Length
1.	"Woo Weekend"	3:58
2.	"No Dance, No Life"	3:50
3.	"Woo Weekend" (Instrumental)	3:53
4.	"No Dance, No Life" (Instrumental)	3:47

DVD
No.	Title	Length
1.	"Woo Weekend" (MV)

Limited DVD
No.	Title	Length
2.	"Making Of "Woo Weekend""

== Charts ==
Oricon Chart (Japan)

Chart	Peak position	Sales total
Oricon Daily Singles Chart	5	
Oricon Weekly Singles Chart	10	12,128
