= Only One (BoA album) =

- Digital cover

Studio album by BoA
- Released: July 22, 2012
- Studio: SM Studios (Seoul)
- Genre: R&B; dance-pop; electropop
- Length: 30:56
- Language: Korean
- Label: SM

BoA chronology
| Hurricane Venus (2010) | Only One (2012) | Who's Back? (2014) |

Alternative cover
- Regular edition cover

Singles from Only One
- 1. "One Dream" Released: March 18, 2012; 2. "Only One" Released: July 22, 2012; 3. "The Shadow" Released: August 17, 2012

Only One is the seventh Korean studio album (fifteenth overall) by South Korean recording artist BoA. It was released through SM Entertainment on July 22, 2012. The record features songwriting contributions from various regional and international musicians, including Miriam and Olivia Nervo, SM composer Kenzie, and Kim Tae-sung. The single "One Dream" was first released as a collaboration with Henry Lau and Key for the audition show K-pop Star in March 2012, while the titular single "Only One" and "The Shadow" were promoted after the release of the album.

Commercially, Only One peaked at number two on the South Korean Gaon Album Chart, and was the 46th best-selling album of the year with sales of over 36,000 copies. Elsewhere in Asia, the album peaked at number 63 on the Japanese Oricon Album Chart and number nine on the Taiwanese G-Music East Asian Albums chart. The single "Only One" peaked at number two on the Gaon Digital Chart upon the release of the album and received over 2,100,000 digital downloads, making it her highest charting and best-selling single on Gaon since its creation in 2010.

== Background and release ==
On July 16, 2012, SM Entertainment announced that BoA will be coming back with her seventh Korean album titled Only One, two years after the release of her sixth album Hurricane Venus. For the choreography of her title track, "Only One", she enlisted the help of Nappytabs who also contributed on the choreography on her upcoming dance flick Make Your Move 3D. SM Entertainment also announced that BoA will be promoting the album via her own comeback show BoA 4354. The number represents the days BoA has been in the entertainment industry.

The album has two editions: regular and limited. Along with the album, fans can order different bundles that come with a photobook and/or poster. The limited edition of the release included a special packaging containing a 48-page photobook, while the regular edition contained a 24-page photobook. In 2013, BoA re-recorded the title track and "The Shadow" in Japanese and released it as her 32nd single titled under Avex Trax on February 27, 2013. The single peaked at number ten on the Oricon Singles Chart while the Japanese recording of "Only One" reached number eight on the Billboard Japan Hot 100. The original album became available in the Philippines on July 5, 2013.

== Development and composition ==
I feel that this album is my best work to date, "I really love every track." "I wanted to do music that puts the vocals up front... relaxing my shoulders a bit. Everyone around me helped me create that kind of laid-back feel for this album."

—BoA commenting on the creative development of Only One.

The Korea Times noted that the record served as "a departure from the sleek, fast-paced and beat-heavy dance music she has become synonymous with", particularly from her previous albums BoA (2009), Identity (2010) and Hurricane Venus (2010). BoA elaborated that the creative process behind the record was to produce a relaxing and "comforting" album that could resonate with the general public, even if they were not necessarily fans of her. She acknowledged that even though electronic music styles remained trendy at the time, her personal preference for Only One nonetheless leaned towards a more "relaxed" and easygoing aesthetic. Although the album did not contain large amounts of electronic elements, BoA intended to craft the album's composition to appeal to those who still appreciated her electronic style, similar to what she showcased in Hurricane Venus.

== Commercial performance ==
The title track "Only One" was released digitally on July 22, 2012. It entered the Billboard K-pop Hot 100 at number 12 and peaked at number 2 on its fourth week. It remained in the top 3 for four weeks. It stayed in the top of the Gaon charts for weeks, and has sold about 2 million singles as of October. The physical album was released on July 25, 2012, and sold over 28,000 copies on its first six days of release. Since August 2012, the album has sold more than 34,000 copies in total. The album also got more than 934,059 digital downloads according to Gaon Chart. The album is her best selling Korean album so far with the combination of digital and physical sales.

== Track listing ==
Only One track listing
| No. | Title | Writer(s) | Producer(s) | Length |
|---|---|---|---|---|
| 1. | "Only One" | BoA | BoA | 3:37 |
| 2. | "The Shadow" | BoA | Kenzie | 3:20 |
| 3. | "Hope" (네모난 바퀴) | Hongzhi Yu, Kim Tae Sung, T-SK, Miriam Nervo and Olivia Nervo | Nervo | 4:35 |
| 4. | "Not Over U" | Hongzhi Yu, Kim Tae Sung, T-SK, Miriam Nervo and Olivia Nervo | Nervo | 3:43 |
| 5. | "The Top" | Miss Pitt, Karen Ann Poole, Stuart Crichton | Stuart Crichton | 2:37 |
| 6. | "Mayday! Mayday!" (너에게 닿기를 간절히 외치다) | her0ism, Alex Geringas, Tommy Lee James | Alex Geringas, Tommy Lee James | 3:39 |
| 7. | "One Dream" (featuring Henry of Super Junior-M and Key of Shinee) | Palo Alto, Toby Gad, Marty James, Lyrica Anderson | Toby Gad | 2:28 |
| 8. | "Only One" (Instrumental) | | | 3:37 |
| 9. | "The Shadow" (Instrumental) | | | 3:20 |
| Total length: | | | | 30:56 |

== Charts ==
=== Weekly charts ===
| Chart (2012–2013) | Peak position |
|---|---|
| Japanese Albums (Oricon) | 63 |
| South Korean Albums (Gaon) | 2 |
| Taiwanese East Asian Albums (G-Music) | 9 |
| US World Albums (Billboard) | 12 |

=== Monthly charts ===
| Chart (2012) | Peak position |
|---|---|
| South Korean Albums (Gaon) | 6 |

=== Year-end charts ===
| Chart (2012) | Position |
|---|---|
| South Korean Albums (Gaon) | 46 |

== Sales ==
Sales figures for Only One
| Region | Certification | Certified units/sales |
|---|---|---|
| Japan | — | 3,230 |
| South Korea | — | 36,000 |
