= Tail of Hope =

Single by BoA
- B-side: "Baby You..."
- Released: June 26, 2013
- Recorded: 2013
- Genre: J-Pop; electropop
- Length: 3:51
- Label: Avex Trax
- Songwriters: Sara Sakurai; Claire Rodriguez; Daniel Sherman; Andrew Gilbert

BoA singles chronology
"Only One" (2013)	"Tail of Hope" (2013)	"Message" (2013)

Music video
- "Tail of Hope" on YouTube

"Tail of Hope" is a song recorded by South Korean singer BoA, released on June 26, 2013. The song serves as the theme song for the Japanese Fuji-TV drama Hakui no Namida. The B-side is the song "Baby You...", a rewritten Japanese version of her Korean song "Disturbance".

== Background ==
"Tail of Hope" is the theme song for the Japanese drama Hakui no Namida, which began airing on April 1, 2013. This is BoA's thirty-third Japanese single and was released on June 26, 2013. A Japanese version of BoA's self-written Korean song "Disturbance" released earlier in January 2013 is the single's B-side. An English version of the song released as a separate special edition CD was also made available exclusively to members of BoA's official fan club who purchased both the CD and CD+DVD editions.

== Track listing ==
No.	Title	Lyrics	Music	Length
1.	"Tail of Hope"	Sara Sakurai	Claire Rodrigues, Daniel Sherman, Andrew Gilbert	3:51
2.	"Baby You.."	BoA, Sakurai (supervision)	BoA	3:20
3.	"Tail of Hope (Instrumental)"	Sara Sakurai	Rodrigues, Sherman, Gilbert	3:51
4.	"Baby You.. (Instrumental)"	BoA, Sara Sakurai (supervision)	BoA	3:17
Total length:				14:19

DVD
No.	Title	Director	Length
1.	"Tail of Hope (music video)"	Toshiyuki Suzuki	5:36
2.	"Sonna Kimi (Disturbance) Korean version (music video)" (そんな君 "You the Way You Are")	Kwon Soonwook	3:47
3.	"Tail of Hope (making)"	Suzuki	3:43

Digital download
No.	Title	Lyrics	Music	Length
1.	"Tail of Hope"	Sara Sakurai	Claire Rodrigues, Daniel Sherman, Andrew Gilbert	3:51
2.	"Baby You.."	BoA, Sakurai (supervision)	BoA	3:20
Total length:				7:11

== Charts ==
Chart (2013)	Peak position
Japan (Oricon)	12
Japan (Japan Hot 100)	19

== Personnel ==
Personnel details were sourced from the liner notes booklet of "Tail of Hope."

- Anna – Hair, make-up
- Andrew Gilbert – arrangement (#1, #3)
- Yu Hamashima – "Tail of Hope" music video producer
- Kim Terung – arrangement (#2, #4)
- Kim Yongshin – arrangement (#2, #4)
- Kwon BoA – vocals
- Kwon Soonwook – "Disturbance" music video director
- Metaoloz Creative Group – "Disturbance" music video production
- Daniel Sherman – arrangement (#1, #3)
- Satsuki Naono – creative coordination
- Claire Rodrigues – arrangement (#1, #3)
- Chie Sekine – graphic design
- Shino Suganuma – styling
- Toshiyuki Suzuki – art direction, "Tail of Hope" music video director
- Tisch – photographer
