= Shout It Out (BoA song) =

Single by BoA
- Released: March 5, 2014
- Recorded: 2013
- Genre: J-pop; dance-pop
- Length: 16:36
- Label: Avex Trax
- Producer: Lee Soo Man

BoA singles chronology
"Message / Call My Name" (2013)	"Shout It Out" (2014)	"Masayume Chasing" (2014)

Shout It Out is BoA's 35th Japanese single. It was released on March 5, 2014, after being pushed back from February 26. it comes with 6 different formats, CD Only, CD+DVD A (Music Video), CD+DVD B (Dance Ver and making of), 2 versions of USBs, and digital downloads. The 3 versions of CD+DVD and CD Only physical copies spell out B O A, respectively.

== Music video ==
The full music video was premiered at Avex' official YouTube channel on January 21, 2014.

The music video itself features a strong and heavy dance routine which was choreographed by Rino Nakasone and Mikey. There were 3 outfits in total, 2 of them which were worn during dancing and singing parts, and the other one is a pink jacket with gray legging where she did a split in a dance showdown scene.

== Special promotion ==
A special campaign, "Shout It Out" Window Showcase at Bershka was done on the release date, which featured dancers dancing to "Shout It Out" dancing routine in Bershka building in Shibuya.

== Critical reception ==
Shout It Out receives generally good reviews, MuuMuse states "those spitfire verses and that sizzling electro-pop production are more than enough to make this one an instant hit". J-Pop Chitai also praises BoA's voice in 'close to me' giving the single 3 stars out of five.

== Track listing ==
=== CD ===
1. Shout It Out
2. close to me
3. Shout It Out (Instrumental)
4. close to me (Instrumental)

=== DVD A ===
1. Shout It Out (Music Video - Original Version)

=== DVD B ===
1. Shout It Out (Music Video - Dance Version)
2. Shout It Out (Making of)

== Chart performance ==
Release	Chart	Peak position	Sales total
March 5, 2014	Oricon Daily Singles Chart	9	
March 5, 2014	Oricon Weekly Singles Chart	12	7,515
March 5, 2014	Billboard Japan Hot 100	37	
