= Milestone (song) =

Single by BoA

Single by BoA
- Released: December 7, 2011
- Recorded: 2011
- Length: 57:36
- Label: Avex Trax
- Songwriter: STY
- Producer: Soo-Man Lee

BoA singles chronology
"I See Me" (2010)	"Milestone" (2011)	"Disturbance" (2013)

Milestone is BoA's first DVD single (31st overall) which was released on December 7, 2011 to commemorate her 10th anniversary in Japan. The song is written and composed by STY who was requested by Avex to write a song for BoA's 10th anniversary. The song was first performed at Audio Technica's 50th-anniversary live party, and later a 7-second snippet of the song live performance at J-Wave Live: Autumn was leaked.

The DVD consists of 30 minutes' worth of videos, including the music video, making of and short documentary and interview videos.

== Information ==
The single consists of one new song, "Milestone", and two previously released songs: "I See Me" and "Meri Kuri ~Best & USA Version~". BoA stated that "Meri Kuri ~Best & USA Version~" was also included because the release was around Christmas time. "I See Me", however, had previously been unreleased.

Music Video was released on MTV Japan on November 22, 2011. It was later released by Avex on YouTube on December 4. The video was identified as the short version but it's actually the normal version.

== Promotions ==
BoA performed Milestone in various events like Audio Technica 50th Anniversary Live Party, J-Wave Live: Autumn, and Soul Member Meeting Vol. 5: BoA 10th Anniversary & Birthday Party. Some TV Performances alongside the normal version of "Meri Kuri" were performed. BoA also performed a trio performance alongside Mai Kuraki and Kana Nishino. The trio sang a medley of their hits "Kimi tte", "Strong Heart" and "Meri Kuri" at Live FNS Music Party.

"Milestone" was used in Audio Technica 50th-anniversary products CM. Both "I See Me" and "Meri Kuri ~Best & USA Version~" were also used in Audio Technica commercials.

== Track list ==
=== CD ===
1. Milestone
2. I See Me
3. Meri Kuri ~Best & USA Version~
4. Milestone (Inst.)
5. I See Me (Inst.)
6. Meri Kuri ~Best & USA Version~ (Inst.)

=== DVD ===
1. Milestone (Music Video)
2. Milestone (Making)
3. BoA 10th film: From the Past to the Present

== Charts ==
Chart	Peak position	Sales total
Oricon DVD Chart	4	7,722
Hot 100 Billboard Japan	7	
