= BoA =

South Korean singer (born 1986)

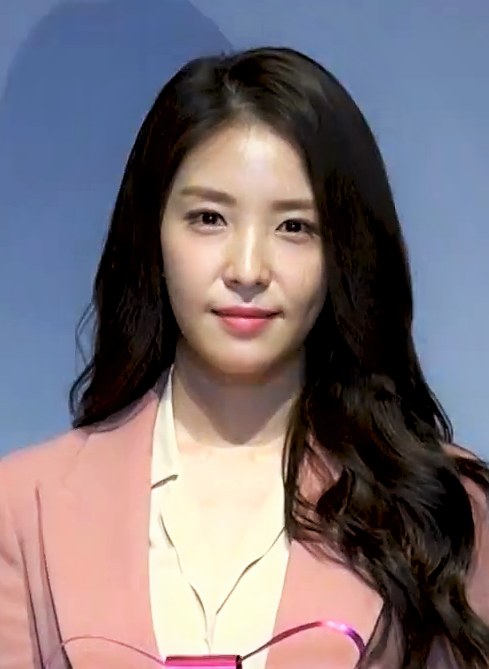
- BoA in April 2018
- Born: Kwon Bo-ah; November 5, 1986 (age 40); Guri, South Korea
- Occupations: Singer; songwriter; actress
- Works: Albums; singles; videos; tours
- Musical career
- Genres: K-pop; J-pop; dance-pop; R&B
- Instrument: Vocals
- Years active: 2000–present
- Labels: SM; Avex Trax; BApal
- Member of: Got the Beat

Korean name
- Hangul: 권보아
- RR: Gwon Boa
- MR: Kwŏn Poa

Signature
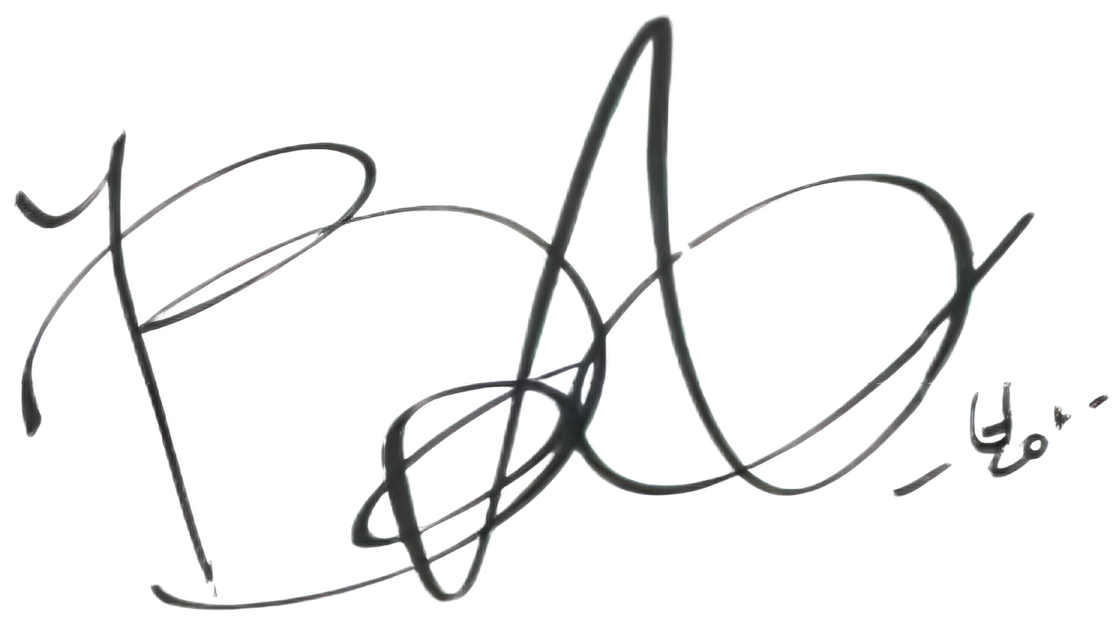

Kwon Bo-ah (Korean: 권보아; born November 5, 1986), known professionally as BoA, is a South Korean singer, songwriter, and actress often referred to as the "Queen of K-pop".

Born and raised in Gyeonggi Province, South Korea, BoA was discovered by SM Entertainment talent agents when she accompanied her older brother, a music video director, to a talent search in 1998. She was trained for two years and made her debut with ID; Peace B (2000). BoA has since released twenty studio albums, including ten in Korean, nine in Japanese, and one in English. On television, she appeared as a judge on the reality competition show K-pop Star (2011–2013), as an actress on the television drama Listen to Love (2016), as a host for the second season of Produce 101 (2017), and as a coach for the third season of The Voice of Korea (2020).

With the release of her debut Japanese studio album, Listen to My Heart (2002), BoA became the first South Korean pop star to break through in Japan. Her Japanese albums Valenti (2003) and Best of Soul (2005) went on to sell over one million copies each according to Oricon; the latter of which remained the last album to do so by a non-Japanese artist for 16 years. Her self-titled English album (2009) became the first record by a K-pop artist to appear on the Billboard 200, debuting at number 127.

BoA has sold over ten million albums throughout her career, and she is one of only three female artists with six consecutive number-one studio albums on the Oricon Albums Chart since her debut, alongside Japanese singer Ayumi Hamasaki and Japanese-American singer Hikaru Utada. She is the recipient of numerous awards in South Korea and Japan, including eight MAMA Awards, six SBS Music Awards, five Japan Record Awards, and five Japan Gold Disc Awards. In 2013, Mnet included her in their Legend 100 Artists list of the most influential artists in South Korea.

== Life and career ==
=== 2000–2003: Debut and commercial success in South Korea and Japan ===
Kwon Bo-ah was born on November 5, 1986. At the age of eleven, BoA accompanied her older brother Kwon Soon-wook to an SM Entertainment talent search in 1998. Though Soon-wook auditioned as a break-dancer, SM talent scouts instead took notice of BoA and offered her a contract on the same night as the auditions. BoA's parents initially opposed the notion of her leaving school to enter the entertainment business but eventually consented after being persuaded by her older brothers Soon-hwon and Soon-wook. She has said that her early influence as a singer was Seo Taiji.

BoA underwent two years of training (involving vocal, dance, English, and Japanese lessons), and at the age of thirteen, she released her debut album ID; Peace B in South Korea on August 25, 2000. The album was moderately successful; it entered the Top 10 of the South Korean charts and sold around 156,000 units. Meanwhile, her Korean record label, SM Entertainment, made arrangements with Japanese label Avex Trax to launch her music career in Japan. She was forced to quit school to prepare and in early 2001, BoA released her first mini-album, Don't Start Now; it sold around 90,000 units. After its release, she took a hiatus from the Korean music industry to focus on the Japanese market, at which time she worked to solidify her skills in Japanese.

BoA began her Japanese music career singing at the Avex-owned club Velfarre. Her debut Japanese album, Listen to My Heart, was released on March 13, 2002. The album was a breakthrough in BoA's career, becoming an RIAJ-certified million-seller and debuting atop the Oricon, the first album by a Korean artist to do so. It was promoted with several singles: the Top 20 hit "ID; Peace B" (originally from the eponymous album), "Amazing Kiss", "Kimochi wa Tsutawaru", the Top 5 hit "Listen to My Heart", and the Top 10 "Every Heart: Minna no Kimochi". After the September 11, 2001 attacks, BoA recorded the charity single "The Meaning of Peace" with Kumi Koda as part of Avex's Song Nation project to raise funds for charity. From 2001 to 2007, BoA hosted Beat it BoA's World, a radio program on the Japan FM Network.

After the release of Listen to My Heart, BoA released her second Korean studio album, No. 1, a month later on April 12, 2002. The album sold around 544,853 units and became the fourth-best-selling record of the year in South Korea. Jumping into the World, a Japanese re-release of the mini-album Don't Start Now), was her first Japanese studio album.

BoA's second Japanese studio album, Valenti (January 2003), became her best-selling album, with over 1,249,000 copies sold. Three singles preceded its release: "Valenti", which peaked at the number-two position on the Oricon chart, "Kiseki / No.1" and "Jewel Song / Beside You: Boku o Yobu Koe", both which also peaked at the number-three position. In support of the album, BoA launched BoA 1st Live Tour Valenti, her first Japanese concert tour. Later in the same year, BoA released her third Korean-language studio album, Atlantis Princess on May 30, 2003, and then released a mini-album Shine We Are! on December 4, 2003. The former was the fifth-best-selling South Korean record of the year with around 345,000 units sold; the latter sold around 58,000 units.

=== 2004–2008: New image, foray into China, and creative control ===
Her third Japanese studio album, Love & Honesty (January 2004) was a musical "change in direction": it contained a rock-dance song ("Rock with You") and "harder" R&B. Though the album failed to match Valenti in sales, it topped the Oricon chart for two weeks and became RIAJ-certified triple-platinum. In support of the album, BoA held a tour, Live Concert Tour 2004: Love & Honesty, spanning nine performances and attracted approximately 105,000 attendants. In contrast with 1st Live Tour, which "emphasized exotic Asian design", the Love & Honesty tour had an "outer-space, sci-fi" theme; among the props were a three-storey-high space ship and the robot Asimo. Her first compilation album, Best of Soul (February 2005), however, sold over a million copies, making BoA the first non-Japanese Asian singer to have two million-selling albums in Japan. It remained the last album by a foreign artist to have sold over a million copies in Japan for 16 years, until BTS in 2021.

BoA reinvented her image for her fourth and fifth Korean albums, My Name (June 2004) and Girls on Top (June 2005), shedding the "cute" and "youthful" style that had characterized previous years and adopted a more "sexy" and "sultry" look. The sales of BoA's Korean albums began to decline: My Name sold 191,000 units and became the eleventh-best-selling South Korean album in 2004 while Girls on Top ranked fourteenth in 2005 with 113,000 units sold. In September 2004, BoA instigated controversy in Japan when she donated ₩50 million to a memorial project for Korean independence activist and nationalist An Jung-geun.

Her fourth Japanese studio album, Outgrow, (February 2006) reached the number-one spot on the Oricon chart for its first week of release, making it her fourth consecutive original Japanese album to do so. With 220,000 copies sold, it became her lowest-selling first-week debut for a studio album at that point. (Note: The first-week sales of Listen to My Heart were approximately 230,000 units, those of Valenti 615,000, and those of Love and Honesty 296,000.) "Do the Motion", the first single from the album, reached the top spot, making her the fourth non-Japanese Asian to have a number-one single on the Oricon charts. "Merry Christmas from BoA" (2005), the album's last single, was the singer's first digital single. In May, BoA renewed her contract with SM Entertainment until 2012. At the time it was noted that she had a shareholding in the company of 100,000 (Approximately worth $1m USD). She performed "Everlasting", the image song for Roman Polanski's Oliver Twist (2005 film). She also voiced Heather the possum in the Korean and Japanese version of the animated film Over the Hedge. On September 21, 2006, she released her first digital single in Korea, a Korean version of "Key of Heart". In support of Outgrow, BoA launched a special Zepp tour, B0A The Live, on September 29, 2006, which lasted until October 29. She staged her first Christmas concert on December 7, 2006.

Three singles preceded BoA's fifth Japanese studio album, Made in Twenty (January 2007): the Top 3 "Nanairo no Ashita (Brand New Beat)/Your Color," the Top 10 "Key of Heart", and the No. 2 hit "Winter Love". The album, which contained R&B and dance songs as well as ballads, debuted at the top of the weekly Oricon charts, making the album her sixth in a row to do so (including one compilation). Having previously compose the song "No More Make Me Sick" for Made in Twenty, BoA assumed creative control over her sixth Japanese album, The Face (February 2008). The album debuted at the top of the weekly Oricon charts, making BoA one of only two artists in Japan to have six consecutive studio albums top the Oricon weekly charts (the other is Ayumi Hamasaki, who has eight consecutive number-one albums). On June 9, 2008, BoA and nine other artists from around the world recorded an English cover of Wei Wei's "Dedication of Love". Produced by Roald Hoffmann and Brian Alan, the single was used to raise funds for victims of the Sichuan earthquake. But due to a tight schedule, BoA was pulled back from this project. Korean jewelry brand Ramee also released "Ramee by BoA", a line of jewelry designed by the singer herself.

=== 2008–2012: American expansion and return to Asia ===
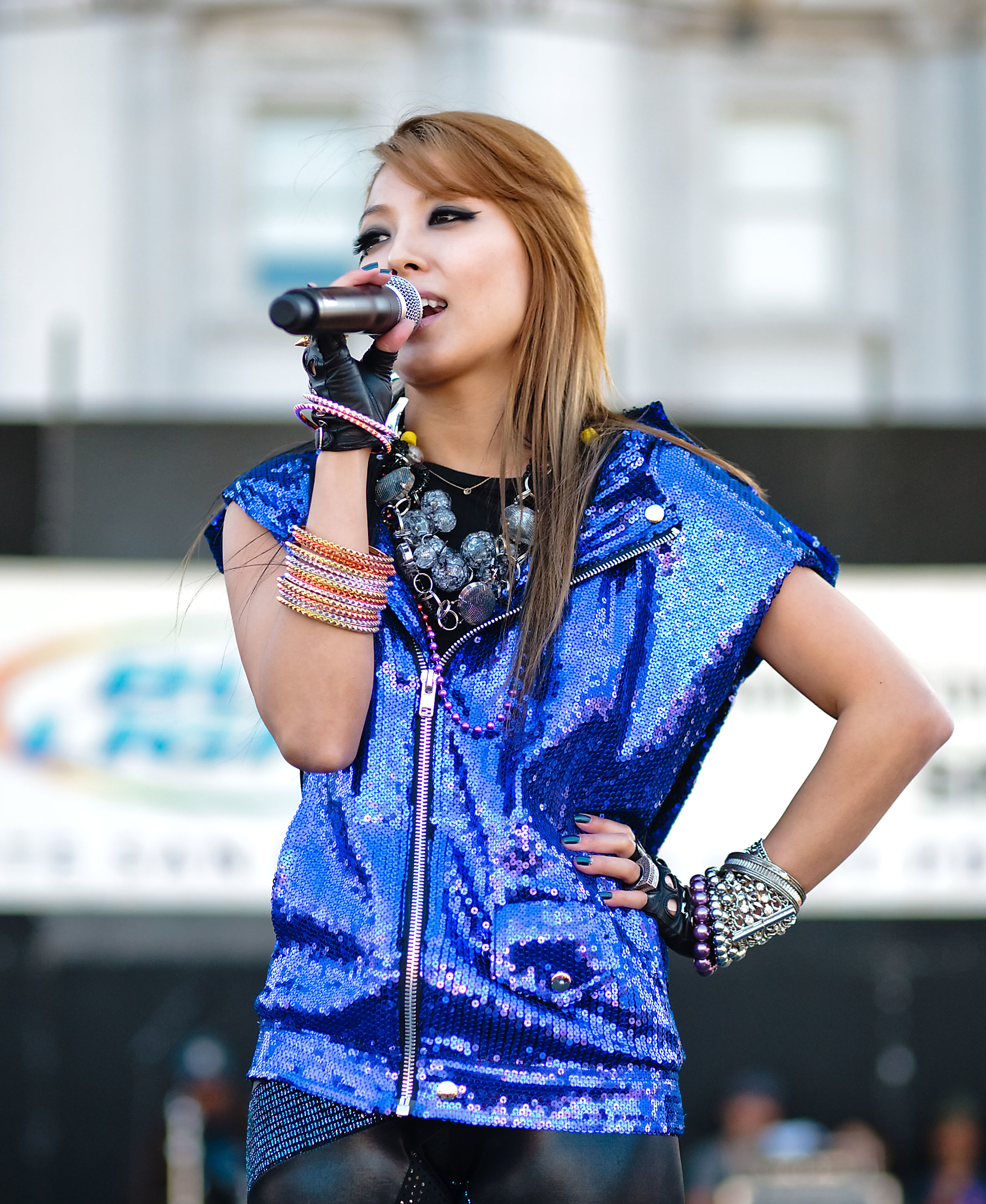
BoA performing in San Francisco in 2009

On September 2, 2008, it was announced that BoA would make her American debut under a new subsidiary label, SM Entertainment USA. Hoping to become a "world-renowned entertainer" in the vein of Janet Jackson, BoA's debut American single "Eat You Up", was produced by Thomas Troelsen, and released on October 21, 2008. It charted at No. 9 on the Billboard Hot Dance Club Play chart. To promote the single, BoA performed "Eat You Up" as well as other songs at YouTube's Tokyo Live concert, and performed in New York City on December 3, 2008, as well as the Jingle Ball at the Anaheim Honda Center on December 6, 2008. The following year, she released "Eien/Universe/Believe in Love" and was also featured in Ravex's single "Believe in Love".

BoA's self-titled English album was released in the U.S. on March 17 and featured tracks by producers Bloodshy and Avant as well as a duet with Sean Garrett. Her second Japanese compilation album, Best & USA was released on March 18 tying together a compilation of recent hits in Japan with her English-language debut. Though she stated that "[i]t has always been my dream to debut in America," she found English tougher to learn than Japanese, and despite living in West Beverly Hills, found it difficult to make friends. BoA later headlined the San Francisco Pride Festival on June 28, 2009, alongside Solange Knowles and The Cliks, where she also performed the song "Energetic" for the first time in public, in addition to "Eat You Up" and "I Did It for Love". On August 31, SM USA released BoA Deluxe, a repackaged version of her debut English album. The album contained two new tracks and the radio edit version of "Energetic".

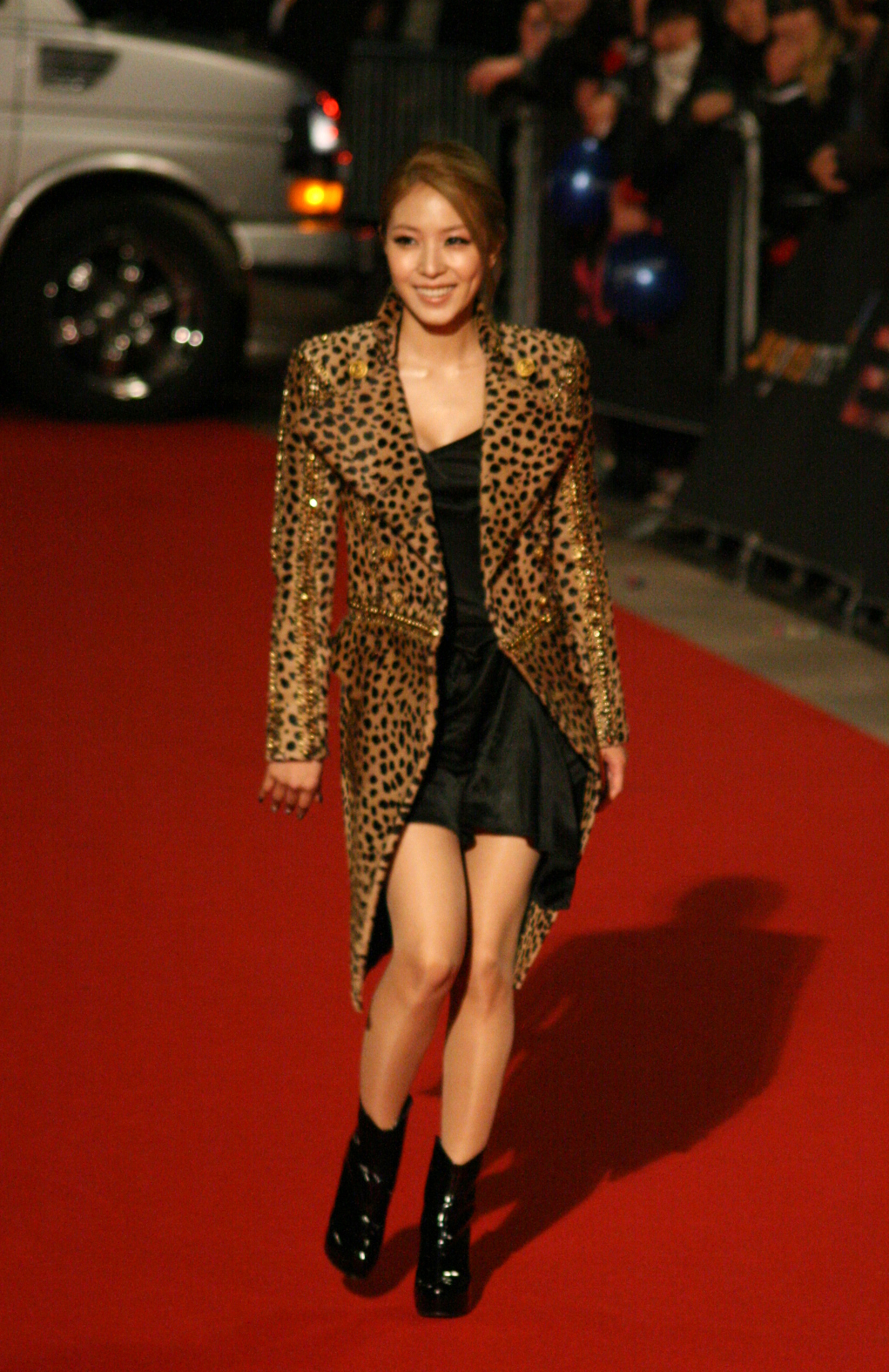
BoA at the 25th Golden Disc Awards in December 2010

With her U.S. career struggling to gain traction, BoA returned to East Asia to release her seventh Japanese album, Identity (February 2010). Promoted by the singles "Bump Bump!" featuring Verbal from M-Flo and "Mamoritai: White Wishes" (December 2009), the album only charted at No. 4, selling 37,606 copies in its first week. With little promotion from her label, it ended her run of six consecutive No. 1 albums, suggesting that it would be impossible for her to sustain her career in three territories simultaneously. Her first Korean album in five years, Hurricane Venus, was released on August 5, 2010, and sold 55,776 units making it the 22nd best selling album in South Korea for 2010. She also represented South Korea and performed at the 7th Asia Song Festival, organized by Korea Foundation for International Culture Exchange, at the Seoul Olympic Stadium.

BoA made her Hollywood movie debut in the dance film Make Your Move 3D, playing the character Aya opposite Derek Hough. Although production ended in 2011, the film was released in 2013. The movie received mixed reviews, with Inkoo Kang of the Los Angeles Times praising the choreography but stating that "[w]henever actor Derek Hough and BoA stop leaping and twirling, [it] is an underwritten mess." To celebrate the 10th anniversary of her Japanese debut, BoA released "Milestone", which ranked at No. 4 on the Oricon Weekly Music-DVD charts. She also held her 10th anniversary concert from December 10 to 11 at Tokyo International Forum.

Following the concert, BoA shifted her activities to her native county, joining the judging panel on SBS's audition program K-pop Star as a representative of S.M. Entertainment, alongside Yang Hyun-suk from YG Entertainment and Park Jin-young from JYP Entertainment. BoA received praise for her ability as a judge with her insightful comments and discerning eyes, and also sang the theme song "One Dream". For her seventh Korean album, Only One (July 2012), BoA wrote and composed its title track, while its dance steps choreographed by NappyTabs, who has previously worked with BoA in Cobu. Upon its release, "Only One" achieved an all-kill on several music charts. She followed this up with the second "The Shadow", which was released August 18, 2012. Additionally, she recorded the song "Lookin'" featuring The Quiett for Hyundai's 'Premium Younique Lifestyle' campaign.

=== 2013–2015: Music production, television role, and 15th anniversary ===
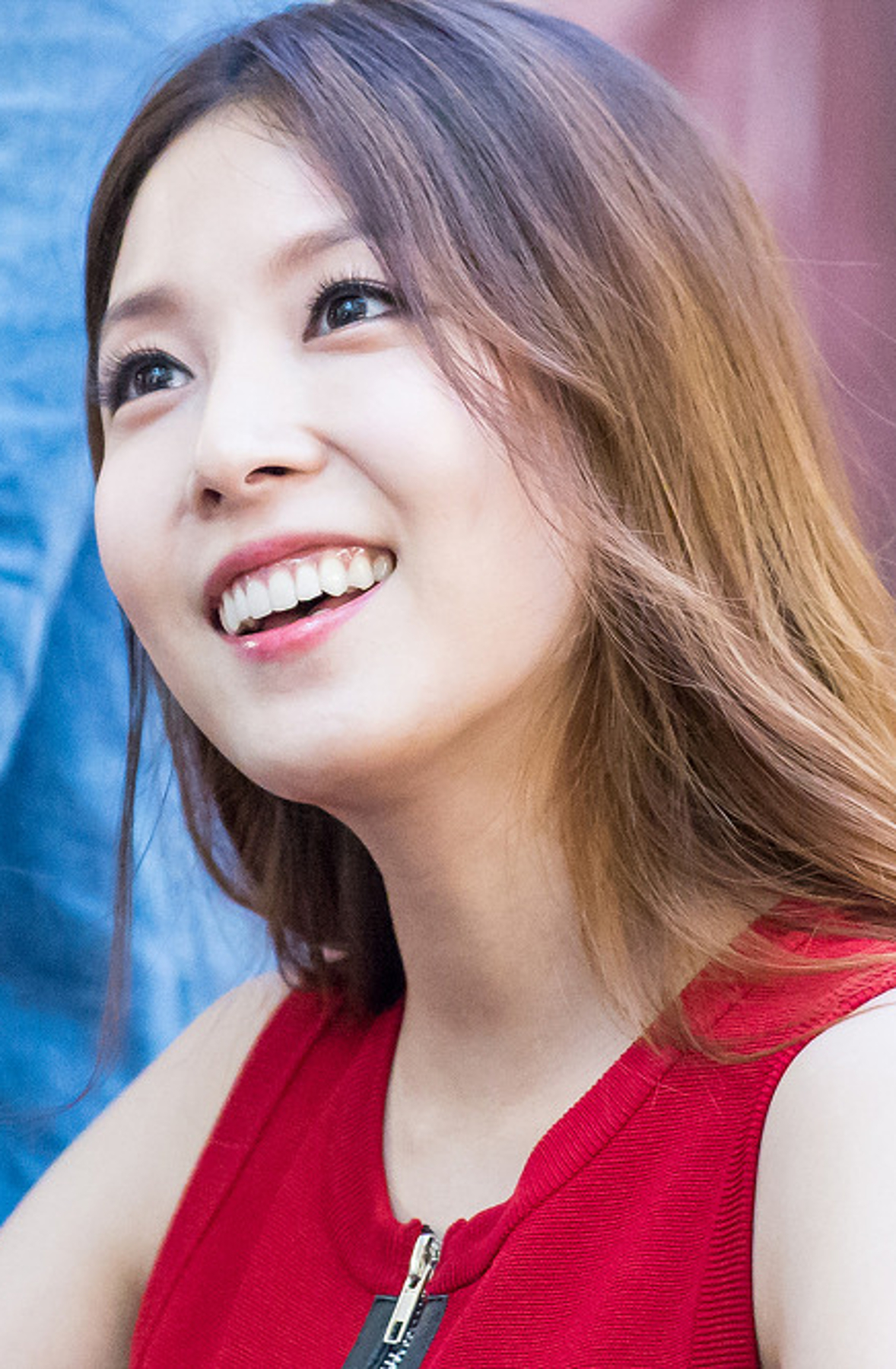
BoA at a fansign event on May 24, 2015

BoA launched her first Korean tour with BoA Special Live 2013: Here I Am tour at the Olympic Hall, and released the song "Disturbance", which she wrote and composed, to commemorate her first concert tour in South Korea. In September 2013, BoA starred in KBS' two-episode drama special Expect to Date alongside Choi Daniel and Yim Si-wan, her full first role in a drama, following a string of cameo appearances. She received praise for her acting performance. She also participated in Infinity Challenge's bi-annual song festival and was paired with Leessang's Gil, with the two co-produced the song "G.A.B". In March 2014, BoA was appointed as a de facto creative director in S.M. Entertainment, alongside labelmate Kangta; she was placed in charge of mental care of artists who debut at a young age.

The singles for BoA's eighth Japanese album, Who's Back? (September 2014), were released over a span of four years prior to the album's release:"Woo Weekend" and "I See Me" in 2010, "Milestone" in 2011, Only One", "Tail of Hope" and "Message / Call My Name" in 2013, and "Shout It Out" and "Masayume Chasing" in 2014. To promote the album, she embarked on her BoA Live Tour 2014 Who's Back? tour in September, her first Japanese tour in four years. After the tour concluded, BoA starred in her first Korean film, Big Match alongside Lee Jung-jae and Shin Ha-kyun though a Japanese single "Fly" was released on December 3, 2014.

Her eighth Korean album Kiss My Lips (May 2015) became her first entirely self-written, self-produced album, working alongside American producers The Underdogs and Stereotypes. The single "Who Are You" (feat. Gaeko) was released prior to the album's unveiling, along with its accompanying music video, which starred EXO's Sehun as the male lead. The rest of the album was unveiled on May 12 along with an official music video of the eponymous title track. Billboard called the singer a promising songwriter despite moments of musical blandness.

In July, she performed at the BoA Special Live 2015: Nowness to commemorate her 15th anniversary. The concert took place on August 22 and 23 at the Sejong Center for the Performing Arts in South Korea, making BoA the first female idol to hold a solo concert at the venue. This was followed by BoA Special Live 2015: Nowness in Japan which took place on December 11, 2015, at Tokyo International Forum Hall-A. Her 15th anniversary in Japan the following year was celebrated in a similar fashion, including the release of the song "Lookbook", and a 15th anniversary edition of BoA's Japanese Winter hit, "Meri Kuri". As part of S.M. Entertainment's special winter project, Winter Garden, BoA released a digital single entitled "Christmas Paradise".

=== 2016–2025: Musical projects, television production, and acting debut ===
On January 12, 2016, BoA released an English-language single "Make Me Complete", which serves as the theme song for the Fuji TV special drama Ooku, starring Sawajiri Erika and Watanabe Mayu. In June, she collaborated with Korean rapper Beenzino for S.M. Entertainment's SM Station project. The duo released the single "No Matter What", which ranked atop five domestic charts. BoA worked with BeatBurger for another SM Station single titled "Music Is Wonderful", where she participated in the composing and writing of the track. From October to November 2016, BoA starred in JTBC's romance melodrama Listen to Love, returning to the small screen after three years.

The following year, BoA became one of the producers for Mnet's boy group survival reality show, Produce 101 Season 2, which aired from April 7 to June 16. BoA later released another song for SM Station, "Spring Rain", an R&B number produced by Kenzie. In May, BoA embarked on her BoA The live in Billboard Live Tour, held in Tokyo and Osaka. She also released the single "Camo," a dance song with a heavy emphasis on bass and synthesizer sounds, which was a change in sound from her previous materials and produced by The Underdogs. In July, she released the Japanese single "Right Here, Right Everywhere" for the soundtrack of drama Yaneura no Koibito. She later starred in the film Autumn Sonata alongside Lee Hak-joo, playing a terminally ill patient.

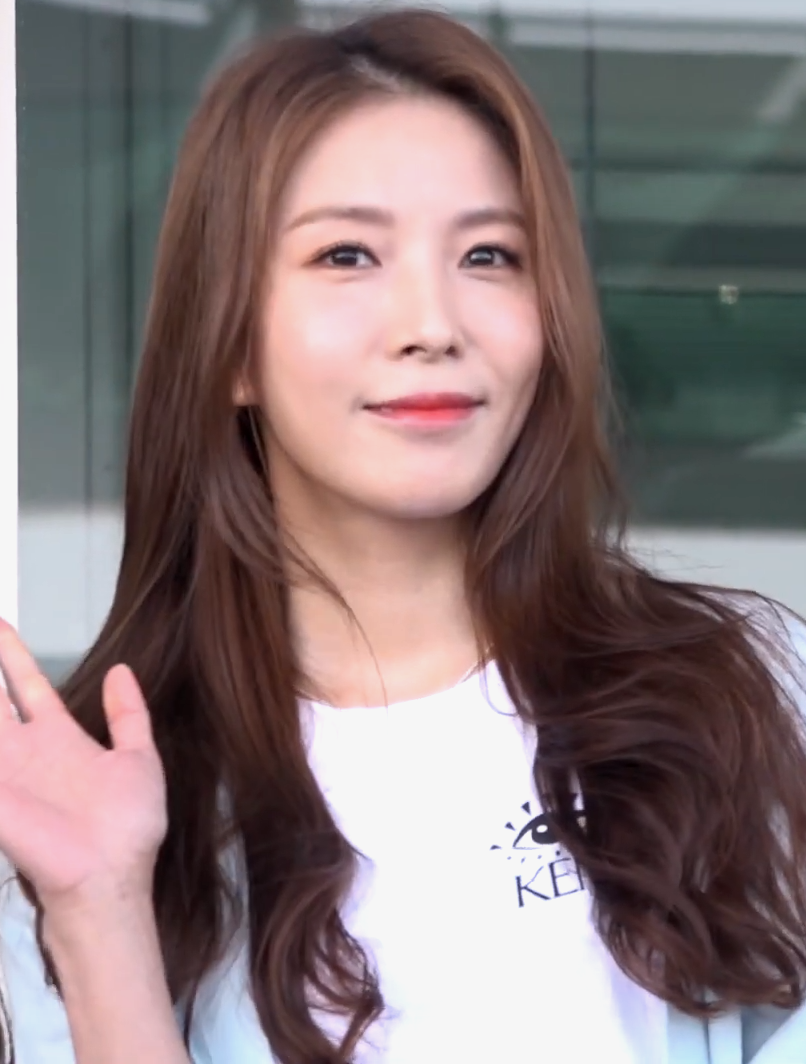
BoA at Incheon Airport on May 15, 2019.

In 2018, BoA returned to Japan and released her ninth Japanese album Watashi Konomama de Iinokana on February 14, 2018, followed by EP Unchained in March. To accompany the release of the EP, she embarked on the BoA The Live 2018: Unchained Tour from March 15 to April 4. People who attend the concerts received a copy of Unchained. On January 31, she released "Nega Dola", which served as a single for BoA's then-upcoming first extended play. The EP, One Shot, Two Shot, was released on February 20, alongside its titular lead single and the song's music video. The EP peaked at number six at the South Korean Gaon Album Chart and number seven at the Billboard World Albums Chart. On October 24, she released her ninth Korean album Woman alongside a lead single of the same name. The album peaked at number six at the Gaon Album Chart, number eleven at the Billboard World Albums Chart.

On June 4, 2019, she released the single "Feedback", which features rapper Nucksal, alongside the song's music video. BoA embarked on her #Mood Tour, which had six dates in Japan and two dates in Seoul, from September to October 2019. On October 23, she released a new Japanese single, "Wishing Well", which she earlier debuted on the tour. On December 11, 2019, she released her second extended play Starry Night.

In May 2020, BoA was featured as one of the coaches for the third season of The Voice of Korea, alongside Dynamic Duo, Sung Si-kyung, and Kim Jong-kook. On December 1, 2020, she released her tenth Korean album Better. SpoTV News shared BoA to join as a judge for Mnet Dance program "Street Woman Fighter". It is a female dance crew competition premiering in August 2021. On November 5, 2021, BoA released the Japanese single, "My Dear", to commemorate her 20th anniversary.

BoA was revealed as a member of the supergroup Got the Beat on December 27, 2021. The group debuted on January 3, 2022. To celebrate her 20th anniversary, BoA released the Japanese compilation album The Greatest on May 30, 2022. On November 8, 2022, BoA announced her third EP Forgive Me along with the title track on the same name on November 22, 2022. In 2024, BoA appeared in the drama Marry My Husband, where she played Oh Yu-ra. Her performance in the drama was met with negative reviews.

On August 4, 2025, BoA released her eleventh studio album Crazier with the lead single of the same name.

=== 2026–present: Independent agency ===
On January 12, 2026, SM Entertainment announced that BoA's contract officially expired on December 31, and that she would be ending her 25-year tenure with the company.

On March 3, 2026, BoA announced that she established her own agency, BApal Entertainment, the meaning of "BoA" and "pal" (friend). This signifies the company's goal of being a company created by "BoA and Friends", or BoA and her fans, reflecting their commitment to building a structure that fosters closer connections between the artist and fans.

On November 4, 2026, BoA released a Japanese mini-album, 歩幅 (Hohaba), and the music video of the title track in celebration of her 25th anniversary of her Japanese debut.

== Artistry ==
=== Influences ===
BoA lists hip hop as her main musical influence, though she also enjoys R&B. Her favorite musicians are Whitney Houston, Michael Jackson, Justin Timberlake, and Ne-Yo; as a result, much of BoA's music is either dance-pop or R&B. Because she also sings ballads, she is often compared to Japanese singers Namie Amuro and Ayumi Hamasaki.

=== Musical style ===
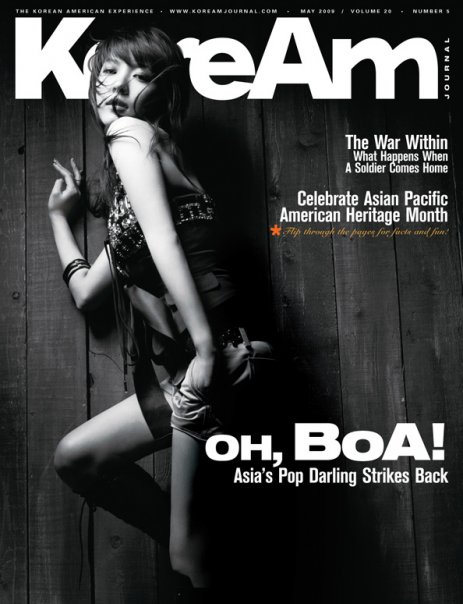
On the cover of KoreAm, May 2009

BoA's debut album, ID; Peace B, contained urban pop, "slickly produced" ballads, and "upbeat dance tunes". As her career went on, she began experimenting with different styles: Valenti contained mostly ballads; Love and Honesty was an experiment with "harder" R&B and rock music. Though her earlier releases were marked by a "cute" and "youthful" style, BoA began to present a more "mature" image starting from the album My Name. In a Talk Asia interview, Anjali Rao noted that some felt that My Name marked the beginning of BoA's decline in popularity and asked if the public would always see the singer as "Little Baby BoA"; BoA replied, "So while I apologize to those people who still want the baby BoA, in fact, what can I do? I just keep growing up! I can't stop that from happening."

The Face was influenced by electropop and included "happy spring" songs ("Sweet Impact" and "Bad Drive"), a guitar-driven "groovy dance" song ("Lose Your Mind"), and ballads. Because the composition and writing of BoA's songs is handled mostly by her staff, BoA has been criticized as being a "manufactured pop star". In response to such criticism, BoA said that "if one person were to force their own will on something, then things that should have gone right could easily go wrong" and that she is "not all that unhappy with the expression that [she is] a manufactured star. In a way, that is true. Because SM Entertainment created the environment and all the surrounding conditions, [she is] able to be successful in the way [she is] now." She later assumed creative control with The Face, while Kiss My Lips became her first entirely self-written, self-produced album.

"Valenti" (2002)
Many of BoA's songs are dance tunes, such as "Valenti" (2002).

BoA has collaborated with high-profile artists. Among the Japanese artists she has performed with are the hip hop group M-Flo (for the single "The Love Bug"), pop singer Kumi Koda, and house DJ Mondo Grosso. She has performed with Western artists: the song "Flying Without Wings" from her album Next World was a collaboration with Irish band Westlife covering the original song; the Bratz single "Show Me What You Got" was performed with Howie D of the American band Backstreet Boys. She also worked with Akon, singing the song "Beautiful", which was featured on the Japanese release of his third album, Freedom. Other artists she has collaborated with are Soul'd Out, Dabo, Verbal (of M-Flo), Rah-D, Seamo, TVXQ, Yutaka Furakawa (of the band Doping Panda), and Crystal Kay (for her single "After Love: First Boyfriend/Girlfriend"). American rock band Weezer covered "Meri Kuri" on the Japanese version of their album Weezer.

== Cultural impact and legacy ==
BoA is regarded as one of South Korea's most influential singers and is widely referred to as the "Queen of K-pop", in recognition of her contributions in spearheading the Korean wave into Japan. BoA's success in the Japanese market has been deemed a catalyst in the Japanese interest in Korean pop music beginning in the early 2000s, when the two countries began promoting cultural exchanges since the end of World War II. Music critics have recognized BoA for improving "civil relations between the Korean and Japanese public through her music and appearances in Japanese radio and television", with Oxford Political Review noting "BoA's role in strengthening Japan-South Korea ties as a cultural envoy". In Alisa Freedman's Introducing Japanese Pop Culture, BoA was noted for "herald[ing] a new phase of Japanese engagement with Korean singers", registering "remarkable success during the first half of the 2000s in Japan". She highlighted that the timing of her success coincided with several political and cultural developments; these include the implementation of Korea's Open-Door Policy, the Korea Japan 2002 FIFA World Cup, and the popularity of the drama series Winter Sonata. Freedman evaluated BoA's career path and localization strategies in Japan for having set "the first trend" of the Korean wave into the country.

Vox hailed BoA as "one of South Korea's best-known exports" in the years after her debut, while The Korea Times called BoA "the forerunner of the new generation of idols who popularized K-pop in Japan and elsewhere." In 2004, the Ministry of Culture, Sports and Tourism honored BoA with the Asian Cultural Exchange Merit Award for her contributions in raising the status of K-pop throughout Asia. Music critic Lim Jin-mo wrote that BoA "opened many doors for pop acts from her country in the second largest music market in the world", acting "as a figurehead for breakthroughs in Japan for South Korean acts" and became "a pivotal figure in K-pop's history". The Diplomat remarked that BoA "paved the way" for future K-pop artists "to later captivate Japanese fans despite souring relations between Seoul and Tokyo." Yim Hyun-su from The Korea Herald viewed her for "forever changing the landscape of South Korea's music industry". In 2016, she was honored with the Presidential Commendation at the Korean Popular Culture and Arts Awards for her contributions to the spread of the Korean wave, and for laying "the foundation for the revival of K-pop".

With nearly 15 years in the entertainment industry, BoA has little to prove in Korea, where she's widely regarded as a pioneer in K-pop's modern-day international platform.

— Billboard (2015)

In 2013, 50 music experts, professors and critics organized by Mnet named BoA one of the 100 most influential artists in South Korean music. "No. 1" was ranked number 27 in a 2006 Gallup Korea survey of 100 all-time favorite Korean songs and was included in Mnet's Legend 100 list of popular Korean songs since the 1960s. In 2021, a panel of 35 music experts organized by Melon and Seoul Shinmun ranked "No. 1" and "Atlantis Princess" number 1 and number 93 in their list of the greatest K-pop songs of all time. Critic Rhian Daly for The Forty-Five ranked "Atlantis Princess" number 1 in her list of the best K-pop songs of all time. Rolling Stone ranked "No. 1" at number 18 in their list of the greatest songs in the history of K-pop, writing it represents "her most emblematic crossover hit". In December 2023, it was included alongside "Gangnam Style" as part of the second induction into the Korea World Music Culture Hall of Fame.

BoA has been cited by many artists in the South Korean music industry as an influence and role model, including Aespa, Girls' Generation's Taeyeon, Sunny, Tiffany, Hyoyeon, Seohyun, Shinee's Key, Exo's Sehun, Red Velvet's Irene, Ailee, Chungha, Yukika Teramoto, Kwon Eun-bi, Baek A-yeon, Mamamoo's Solar, f(x)'s Luna, Kiss of Life's Natty, Lovelyz's Kei, and Billlie's Tsuki. Aespa's Giselle said in a Rolling Stone interview that "Everyone knows her. She's not just famous — she's a legend".

== Other ventures ==
=== Endorsements ===
Due to her wide appeal, BoA has appeared in advertisements for many brands. Among the brands she has promoted are Olympus, Lotte, Nike, L'Oréal, Japanese cosmetic company Kosé, Skechers, Audio-Technica, GM Daewoo and L'Occitane. Several of her songs have been used in affiliation with television shows. "Every Heart: Minna no Kimochi" was used as the ending theme for the anime InuYasha; "Beside You: Boku o Yobu Koe" was used as the opening theme for the anime Monkey Typhoon; "Key of Heart" is the theme song for the Japanese release of Over the Hedge; "Your Color" is the theme song of the video game Ninety-Nine Nights; "Mamoritai: White Wishes" is the theme song of the video game Tales of Graces. "Tail of Hope" was used as the theme for the Japanese drama Hakui no Namida, and "Masayume Chasing" was used as the 15th opening theme song for the anime Fairy Tail.

In 2007, Anycall (a Samsung brand) signed BoA, Xiah (of TVXQ), Tablo (of Epik High), and jazz pianist Jin Bora onto "Anyband", a band created specifically to promote Anycall. The band released only one single, "AnyBand". In December 2010, she recorded "I See Me" for to promote Audio Technica headphones in Japan. The song "Woo Weekend" was used to promote Disney on Ice's 25th Anniversary in Japan while "Lookbook" served as the ending theme for the NTV Kei program Tokui to Goto to Uruwashi no Shelley ga Konya Kurabete Mimashita. BoA served as ambassador for Asia Youth Day in 2014. In August 2017, it was announced that BoA was chosen as promotional ambassador for Jeju Biennale, an inaugural international art event on the resort island of Jeju. Her widespread popularity has also made her a "cultural ambassador"; she has represented South Korea in inter-Asian musical events and has appeared in an Oxford University Press-published English-language textbook.

== Discography ==
Korean albums

- ID; Peace B (2000)
- No. 1 (2002)
- Atlantis Princess (2003)
- My Name (2004)
- Girls on Top (2005)
- Hurricane Venus (2010)
- Only One (2012)
- Kiss My Lips (2015)
- Woman (2018)
- Better (2020)
- Crazier (2025)

Japanese albums

- Listen to My Heart (2002)
- Valenti (2003)
- Love & Honesty (2004)
- Outgrow (2006)
- Made in Twenty (2007)
- The Face (2008)
- Identity (2010)
- Who's Back? (2014)
- Watashi Kono Mama de Ii no Kana (2018)

English albums

- BoA (2009)

== Filmography ==
=== Film ===
Year	Title	Role	Notes	Ref.
2006	Over the Hedge	Heather the Possum (voice)	Korean and Japanese-dubbed versions	
2012	I AM.	Herself	Biographical film of SM Town	
2014	Make Your Move 3D	Aya	Hollywood film	
2014	Venus Talk	Song Beom-sik	Cameo	
2014	Big Match	Soo-kyung		
2015	SM Town the Stage	Herself	Documentary film of SM Town	
2017	Autumn Sonata	Soo-ryun		
2020	202020 BoA	Herself	Documentary film of BoA 20th Anniversary debut	

=== Television series ===
Year	Title	Role	Notes	Ref.
2010	Athena: Goddess of War	Herself	Cameo (ep. 7–8)	
2013	Waiting For Love	Joo Yoo-ae	Special drama	
2016	Listen to Love	Kwon Bo-young		
2024	Marry My Husband	Oh Yura		

=== Television shows ===
Year	Title	Role	Ref.
2011–2012	K-pop Star season 1	Judge for SM Entertainment	
2012–2013	K-pop Star Season 2	Judge for SM Entertainment	
2017	Produce 101 Season 2	MC (National Producer Representative)	
2018	Keyword #BoA	Herself	
2018	Food Diary	Cast Member	
2018	Master in the House	Herself	
2020	The Voice of Korea 2020	Coach	
2020–2021	Nobody Talks to BoA	Main Host	
2021	Street Woman Fighter	Judge	
2022	Street Man Fighter	Judge	
2022	Music Universe K-909	Host	
2023	Dancing Queens on the Road	Cast Member	

== Concerts and tours ==
=== Japan tours ===
- 2003: First Live Tour 2003 – Valenti
- 2004: Live Tour 2004 – Love & Honesty
- 2005: Arena Tour 2005 – Best of Soul
- 2006: The Live "Ura BoA... Kikase Kei (The Other Side of BoA... Listen)"
- 2007: Arena Tour 2007 – Made in Twenty (20)
- 2007: The Live 2007 "X'mas"
- 2008: Live Tour 2008 – The Face
- 2009: The Live 2009 "X'mas"
- 2010: Live Tour 2010 – Identity
- 2010: The Live 2010 "X'mas"
- 2011: The Live 2011 "X'mas" – The 10th Anniversary Edition
- 2014: Live Tour 2014 "Who's back?"
- 2018: The Live 2018 〜Unchained〜

=== Asia tours ===
- 2013: Special Live 2013 – Here I am
- 2015: Special Live 2015 – Nowness
- 2022: BoA 20th Anniversary: The Greatest Live
- 2022: The BoA: Musicality
- 2024: BoA: One's Own Live Tour

=== Concert participation ===
- 2002: SM China
- 2003: SMTOWN Smile Concert 2003
- 2007: 2007 SMTOWN Summer Concert
- 2008: SMTown Live '08
- 2009: BEST & USA Release Party: Thank Your For Your Support!
- 2010–11: SMTown Live '10 World Tour
- 2012–13: SMTown Live World Tour III
- 2014–2015: SM Town Live World Tour IV
- 2016: SM Town Live World Tour V
- 2017: SM Town Live World Tour VI
- 2022: SM Town Live 2022: SMCU Express at Kwangya
- 2022: SM Town Live 2022: SMCU Express
- 2023: SM Town Live 2023: SMCU Palace at Kwangya
- 2025: SM Town Live 2025: The Culture, the Future

== See also ==
- Contemporary culture of South Korea
- Korean Wave
- J-pop

== Footnotes ==
Awards and achievements
Preceded by Kim Gun-mo	13th Seoul Music Awards – Daesang Award; 2002	Succeeded by Lee Hyori
Preceded by Yoo Seungjun	4th Mnet Asian Music Awards – Best Dance Music; 2002	Succeeded by BoA
Preceded by Incumbent	Japan Record Awards – Gold Prize; 2002–2009	Unknown
Preceded by Lee Soo-young	7th Mnet Asian Music Awards – Best Female Solo Artist; 2005	Succeeded by Baek Ji-young
Preceded by Baek Ji-young	12th Mnet Asian Music Awards – Best Female Solo Artist; 2010	Succeeded by Baek Ji-young
