= Only One (BoA song) =

- Japanese single cover

Single by BoA

from the album Only One and Who's Back?
- B-side: "The Shadow"
- Released: July 22, 2012; February 27, 2013 (Japan)
- Studio: SM Yellow Tail Studio; Ingrid Studio
- Genre: Pop; R&B
- Length: 3:39
- Label: SM; Avex Trax
- Lyricist: BoA
- Producer: BoA

BoA singles chronology
"Disturbance" (2013)	"Only One" (2012)	"Tail of Hope" (2013)

Music videos
- "Only One" (Dance ver.) on YouTube "Only One" (Drama ver.) on YouTube

"Only One" is a song recorded by South Korean singer-songwriter BoA for her 2012 album of the same name. Written and composed by BoA herself with additional arrangement by Kim Yong-shin and Kim Tae-seong, the pop and R&B track was released as the second single from Only One on July 22, 2012, to coincide with its parental album release. It was re-recorded in Japanese and released as her 32nd Japanese single under Avex Trax on February 27, 2013. It was later included on the track list of her eighth Japanese studio album Who's Back? (2014).

On August 7, 2012, BoA stated in a fan meeting that she would be releasing the Japanese version of "Only One" in the winter of 2012–2013. She also announced that she would be translating the lyrics from Korean to Japanese herself, as she had written the original in Korean and composed the track herself. Official confirmation came on December 10, 2012, via Avex, that BoA would be releasing a new Japanese single. Reports also alluded to a new music video for the Japanese version of "Only One". A month later, the jackets for both the CD and CD+DVD versions were revealed via her official website.

== Background and release ==
The Japanese single contained five different versions: a CD only, a CD+DVD, a USB Version A, a USB Version B and an iTunes version. The CD+DVD version comes in a larger package (25 by 13 cm (9.8 by 5.1 in)) and includes music videos and a "making of" video for both songs. The USB versions use two different designs, and are limited to Soul (BoA's fanbase in Japan). The USB contains the audio track and has a 4GB capacity.

There were additional products available: an Only One: Dance Version DVD was made available for those who purchased both the first edition of the CD and the CD+DVD in one purchase. A letter set was available to Soul members who bought the CD+DVD, USB version A, and USB version B in one purchase. The letter set included clear files (all 3 types), writing paper, and a ball-point pen. A clear file was available to Soul members who bought one of four available formats (excluding the iTunes version).

== Promotion ==
On the day of the jacket release, a preview of the Japanese version of "Only One" was released via a QR code. The code was distributed floating on the surface of a coffee or a cocktail, redirecting the scanner to BoA featuring the Only One Cocktail website. Incorporating a QR code onto a drink's surface was an international first. The QR code was made of natural food. The website also hosted astrological predictions and a contest. According to Oricon, the campaign commenced in November 2012 with trials in five Tokyo cafes, but only the instrumental version of the song was available prior to January 2013. Two more cafes later ran the promotion in February 2013. The seven cafes were located throughout Shibuya, Tokyo.

BoA also left a promotional message video on the Only One Cocktail website: "Hi everyone I'm BoA. The song that's streaming on this site is actually my new song 'Only One.' This song is a song about separation, as though you are visualizing scenes of separation in more detailed as the lyrics progress. As I think people who have experienced such separation even only for once before will certainly be able to sympathize with the contents of the lyrics and the tune is really easy to remember, everybody please listen to it repeatedly." "Only One" was used as the ending theme song for the TV program Takeshi no Nippon no Mikata and as the commercial song for music.jp.

== Music video ==
The Japanese version of "Only One" has a different music video from the original Korean version, although the choreography is the same. It also includes a scene with BoA singing on the set featured on the cover. For the Korean version, two versions of the music video are released. The dance version was released on July 22, 2012, while the drama version was released three days later.

== Accolades ==
Awards and nominations
Year	Organization	Award	Result	Ref.
2012	Mnet Asian Music Awards	Best Female Artist	Nominated	
2012	Mnet Asian Music Awards	Best Dance Performance – Solo	Nominated	
2012	Mnet Asian Music Awards	Song of the Year	Nominated	
2012	Mnet Asian Music Awards	Artist of the Year	Nominated	

Music program awards
Program	Date	Ref.
Show Champion	August 14, 2012	

== Track listing ==
Japanese CD single

1. "Only One" (Japanese version) – 3:37
2. "The Shadow" (Japanese version) – 3:19
3. "Only One" (Instrumental) – 3:37
4. "The Shadow" (Instrumental) – 3:19

DVD track listing

1. "Only One"
2. "The Shadow"
3. "Only One" (making)
4. "The Shadow" (making)

== Credits and personnel ==
Credits adapted from album's liner notes.

=== Studio ===
- SM Yellow Tail Studio – recording, mixing, digital editing
- Ingrid Studio – recording
- Studio-T – strings recording
- Sonic Korea – mastering

=== Personnel ===
- SM Entertainment – executive producer
- Lee Soo-man – producer
- BoA – vocals, background vocals, producer, lyrics, composition
- Tesung Kim – arrangement, vocal directing
- Kim Yong-shin – arrangement, strings conducting and arrangement
- Yong – strings performing
- Gu Jong-pil – recording, mixing, digital editing
- Jung Eui-seok – recording
- Jung Eun-kyung – recording
- Oh Seong-geun – strings recording
- Song Joo-yong – assistant strings recording
- Jeon Hoon – mastering

== Charts ==
=== Weekly charts ===
Chart (2012–13)	Peak position
Japan (Japan Hot 100)	8
Japan (Oricon)	10
Japan Adult Contemporary (Billboard)	40
South Korea (Gaon)	2
US World Digital Songs (Billboard)	7

=== Year-end charts ===
Chart (2012)	Position
South Korea (Gaon)	33

== Sales ==
Region	Sales amount
Japan (physical)	11,000
South Korea (digital)	2,128,501
South Korea (physical)	2,000
