= Disturbance (BoA song) =

Promotional single by BoA
- Released: January 28, 2013
- Recorded: 2012
- Genre: Neo soul; R&B
- Length: 3:35
- Label: S.M. Entertainment
- Songwriter: BoA
- Producer: BoA

BoA chronology
"Milestone" (2011)	"Disturbance" (2013)	"Only One" (2013)

Music video
- "Disturbance" on YouTube

"Disturbance" (Korean: 그런 너; RR: Geureon Neo; Japanese: そんな君 Sonna kimi; English: "The Way You Are") is a Korean song released as a digital single by South Korean singer BoA, released on January 28, 2013. The song was written and composed by the singer herself as special release for her first Korean tour.

== Background and release ==
"Disturbance" is a song of the soul pop and neo soul genres, written and composed by BoA herself. According to Billboard, the song is a midtempo R&B number which utilizes synthesizers as the background. They further commented that the production is similar to that of BoA's single "Only One". The single was released in conjunction with the singer's first solo concert tour in South Korea. The single was announced on January 23, 2013 and released at noon through Korean music portals, the single's cover and music video feature Shinee member Taemin. Korea JoongAng Daily remarked that the song carries a "sophisticated melody" and BoA's vocals are "appealing [and] distinctive". A Japanese version of the song was released as the B-side to her 33rd Japanese single "Tail of Hope" as "Baby You...", however the Korean version also released on the same single was titled as "Sonna Kimi".

== Music video ==
The music video for the song was filmed in early January 2013 and directed by BoA's older brother, Kwon Soon Wook. It stars BoA herself and Shinee's Taemin as shown on the single artwork. The music video was made interactive as the viewers can choose their own ending at the end of the video: happy or sad ending. Both videos are shown in two separate YouTube videos that were set their privacy as 'Unlisted'.

== Charts ==
Charts (2013)	Peak position
South Korea (Billboard)	9
South Korea (Gaon)	5
