= Hurricane Venus =

Studio album by BoA
- Released: August 5, 2010
- Recorded: March–July 2010
- Studio: SM Studios (Seoul)
- Genre: Pop; R&B; dance-pop; electropop
- Length: 45:01
- Language: Korean
- Label: SM Entertainment

BoA chronology
Identity (2010)	Hurricane Venus (2010)	Only One (2012)

Singles from Hurricane Venus
- 1. "Game" Released: July 28, 2010; 2. "Hurricane Venus" Released: August 2, 2010; 3. "Copy & Paste" Released: September 23, 2010

Hurricane Venus is the sixth Korean language studio album (fourteenth overall) by South Korean singer BoA, released on August 2, 2010, by SM Entertainment, to coincide with the tenth anniversary of the singer's career. It is BoA's first major Korean-language release since the repackage version of Girls on Top in 2005, and subsequently her second major release in a year following her seventh Japanese album Identity in February 2010.

A dominant electro-pop and R&B record, the album was executively produced by her label's founder Lee Soo-man, while seeing BoA co-writing and composing along with several songwriters and production teams, namely Hitchhiker, Kenzie, Yoo Young-jin, Erik Lidbom, Anne Judith Wik, Martin Hansen, Kim Jong-wan, Kim Dong-ryul, Lindy Robbins, Toby Gad, and more. Under the repackage title Copy & Paste, the album was re-released on September 27, 2010, nearly two months after its original release.

== Announcement ==
In March 2010, SM Entertainment announced that BoA was to release a new Korean-language album—her first since 2005—to commemorate the tenth anniversary of her 2000 debut. BoA was said to be in the process of selecting songs for the album, and would return to South Korea following the completion of her Japanese tour to promote Identity in April.

== Promotion and distribution ==
The music video for "Game" was released to various websites on the weekend of July 24–25, while the tracks for both "Game" and "Yeop Saram (Stand By)" (Korean: 옆사람; "The Person Next to Me") were released on July 28. "Game" entered the Gaon weekly singles chart at number eleven.

A music video for the album's title track has been filmed in 3-D by Pace HD—who worked on the 2009 film Avatar—and Samsung Electronics. The song "Hurricane Venus" was released ahead of the album on August 2. Hurricane Venus was released in South Korea on August 5, 2010.

Following its release the album was ranked number one on the Hanteo album sales chart, and in the top five of other music charts such as Naver and Soribada. The album is also due to be released in other Asian countries, including Thailand, the Philippines (not yet released as of this time in the country), China, Indonesia and Japan.

On August 6, BoA performed "Hurricane Venus" and "Dangerous" on the Korean television programme Music Bank. On the same day, Hurricane Venus was the third most talked about topic on the social networking site Twitter. The album sold 44,745 units in the first ten days of its release and ranked first in the month of August sales with 54,659 units. By the end of the year Hurricane Venus sold 55,776 units making it the 22nd best selling album in South Korea for 2010.

== Songs ==
"Romance", described as a "pop jazz ballad", was arranged by jazz pianist Song Young-joo. "Don't Know What to Say" is a collaboration with BoA's brother Kwon Soon-hwon, a classical pianist. For two of the album's highly promoted tracks, "Dangerous" and "Adrenaline", BoA again teamed up with Danish producer Thomas Troelsen, who also produced her American debut single, "Eat You Up", in 2008.

== Copy & Paste ==
A repackaged version of the album was released on September 27, 2010. Retitled Copy & Paste, the repackaged album included two new songs, "Copy & Paste" and "보고 싶더라 (I'm OK)". A teaser video for the album unveiled on September 20, and BoA promoted the album with a performance on Music Bank on September 24.

"Copy & Paste" is the third and final single released from BoA's sixth album effort. On September 19 BoA released the official teaser to the upcoming single, followed by an official digital single release on September 23. The following day promotions started for the single on television shows such as Music Bank, Show! Music Core and Inkigayo. The official music video was released on September 28.

== Accolades ==
Awards and nominations
Year	Organization	Award	Result	Ref.
2010	Mnet Asian Music Awards	Album of the Year	Nominated	
2010	Mnet Asian Music Awards	Best Female Solo Artist	Won	
2010	Golden Disc Awards	Album Bonsang (Main Prize)	Won	
2010	Golden Disc Awards	Album Daesang (Grand Prize)	Nominated	

Music program wins
Song	Program	Date	Ref.
"Hurricane Venus"	Music Bank	August 13, 2010	
"Hurricane Venus"	Music Bank	August 20, 2010	
"Hurricane Venus"	Music Bank	August 27, 2010	
"Hurricane Venus"	Inkigayo	August 22, 2010	
"Hurricane Venus"	Inkigayo	August 29, 2010	

== Track listing ==
Hurricane Venus track listing
No.	Title	Lyrics	Music	Arranged by	Length
1.	"Game"	Kim Bu-min	Hitchhiker	Hitchhiker	3:16
2.	"Hurricane Venus"	BoA, Hong Ji-yu, Kenzie	Erik Lidbom, Anne Judith Wik, Martin Hansen	Erik Lidbom, Anne Judith Wik, Martin Hansen	3:10
3.	"Dangerous"	Kim Bu-min	Thomas Troelsen, Engelina	Thomas Troelsen, Engelina	2:52
4.	"옆 사람 (Stand By)"	Kim Dong-ryul	Kim Dong-ryul	Hwang Seong-je	5:07
5.	"M.E.P (My Electronic Piano)"	Kim Jung-bae	Kenzie	Kenzie	3:21
6.	"Let Me"	BoA	BoA	Hitchhiker	3:32
7.	"한별 (Implode)" (featuring Kim Jong-wan of Nell)	Kim Jong-wan	Kim Jong-wan	Kim Jong-wan	6:32
8.	"Adrenaline"	Kim Yi-na	Lindy Robbins, Toby Gad	Lindy Robbins, Toby Gad	3:05
9.	"하루하루 (Ordinary Day)"	BoA	BoA	Gakushi	4:47
10.	"Don't Know What to Say"	BoA	Vincent Paul Degiorgio, Robyn Newman, Matthew Tishler	Kwon Soon-hwon	4:09
11.	"로망스 (Romance)"	Ahn Sin-ae	Hwang Chan-hee	Song Young-ju	5:08
Total length:					45:01

Copy & Paste track listing
No.	Title	Lyrics	Music	Arranged by	Length
1.	"Copy & Paste"	Kenzie, Kang Ji-won, Kim Bu-min	Jens Gad, Lamenga Kafi, Erik Lewander	Jens Gad, Lamenga Kafi, Erik Lewander	3:43
2.	"Hurricane Venus"	BoA, Hong Ji-yu, Kenzie	Erik Lidbom, Anne Judith Wik, Martin Hansen	Erik Lidbom, Anne Judith Wik, Martin Hansen	3:10
3.	"Dangerous"	Kim Bu-min	Thomas Troelsen, Engelina	Thomas Troelsen, Engelina	2:54
4.	"I'm OK (보고 싶더라)"	Wheesung	Ronny Svendsen, Nermin Harambasic, Robin Jenssen, Anne Judith Wik, Boyowa Olugbo, Qabaniso Malewesi	Ronny Svendsen, Nermin Harambasic, Robin Jenssen, Anne Judith Wik, Boyowa Olugbo, Qabaniso Malewesi	3:35
5.	"Game"	Kim Bu-min	Hitchhiker	Hitchhiker	3:16
6.	"옆 사람 (Stand By)"	Kim Dong-ryul	Kim Dong-ryul	Hwang Seong-je	5:07
7.	"M.E.P (My Electronic Piano)"	Kim Jung-bae	Kenzie	Kenzie	3:21
8.	"Let Me"	BoA	BoA	Hitchhiker	3:32
9.	"한별 (Implode)" (featuring Kim Jong-wan of Nell)	Kim Jong-wan	Kim Jong-wan	Kim Jong-wan	6:32
10.	"Adrenaline"	Kim Yi-na	Lindy Robbins, Toby Gad	Lindy Robbins, Toby Gad	3:05
11.	"하루하루 (Ordinary Day)"	BoA	BoA	Gakushi	4:47
12.	"Don't Know What to Say"	BoA	Vincent Paul Degiorgio, Robyn Newman, Matthew Tishler	Kwon Soon-hwon	4:09
13.	"로망스 (Romance)"	Ahn Sin-ae	Hwang Chan-hee	Song Young-ju	5:08
Total length:					52:22
