= Best & USA =

Greatest hits album by BoA
- Released: March 18, 2009
- Recorded: 2005–2009
- Genres: J-pop; pop; dance-pop
- Languages: Japanese; English
- Label: Avex Trax
- Producers: Masaaki Asada; ats-; Simon Brenting; Bloodshy & Avant; Sean Garrett; Kazuhiro Hara; h-wonder; Daisuke "D.I" Imai; Jonas Jeberg; Henrik Jonback; Brian Kennedy; Yōko Kuzutani; Yoko Kuzuya; Greg Lawson; Yoji Noi; Ravex; Damon Sharpe

BoA chronology
BoA (2009)	Best & USA (2009)	Identity (2010)

Singles from Best & USA
- 1. "Eien/Universe/Believe in Love" Released: February 18, 2009

Best & USA is the third Japanese compilation album by South Korean recording artist BoA. A Japanese issue coinciding with the release of her American first album, BoA, it contains the American album (USA) as well as a compilation of Japanese singles (Best). It was released on March 18, 2009.

Best & USA was better received in Japan than BoA had been in the US, reaching number two on the Oricon weekly album charts. It sold over 100,000 copies and was certified Gold by the Recording Industry Association of Japan. The Japanese songs were also released separately as Best II on April 15, 2009.

== History ==
In 2008, after successfully breaking into the Japanese market, BoA and her label SM Entertainment set out to record new material to crack the lucrative U.S. pop market. The label founded a new American branch, SM Entertainment USA, and BoA recorded a new album of English material to be promoted in the United States, ultimately titled BoA and released on March 17, 2009.

Coinciding with the American release, BoA also released Best & USA in Japan, including both the new album and a compilation of her Japanese singles. The album was released in several formats mixing the Japanese singles with the new material. BoA promoted Best & USA with appearances in Japan amid her promotions in the United States.

== Reception ==
Adam Greenberg of AllMusic gave the album three stars on the strength of the Japanese compilation, which he found greatly superior to the American recording. In contrast to the "basic and straightforward" American songs, he found that the Japanese singles showcased BoA's strengths as a singer and gave the album value as a compilation of her material.

== Track listing ==
Best & USA track listing (CD only version)
No.	Title	Lyrics	Music	Length
1.	"Universe featuring Crystal Kay & Verbal from M-Flo" (from Eien/Universe/Believe in Love)	Kumo, Verbal	Christian Karlsson, Pontus Winnberg, Henrik Jonback, So Shy, Magnus Wallbert, Balewa Mohammad,	4:15
2.	"Do the Motion" (from Outgrow)	Natsumi Watanabe	Yōko Kuzutani	4:14
3.	"Eien" (from Eien/Universe/Believe in Love)	Narumi Yamamoto	Daisuke "D.I" Imai	4:30
4.	"Nanairo no Ashita: Brand New Beat" (from Made in Twenty (20))	BoA, Mizue	Yoji Noi	4:33
5.	"Winter Love" (from Made in Twenty (20))	Natsumi Watanabe	ats-	5:44
6.	"Meri Kuri: Best & USA Version"	Chinka Yasushi	Kazuhiro Hara
7.	"Sweet Impact" (from The Face)	Ryoji Sonoda	Hara	5:02
8.	"Dakishimeru" (from Outgrow)	Natsumi Watanabe	Hara	3:48
9.	"Love Letter" (from The Face)	BoA, Natsumi Watanabe	Yoko Kuzuya	5:05
10.	"Make a Secret" (from Outgrow)	Narumi Yamamoto	Masaaki Asada	4:48
11.	"Everlasting" (from Outgrow)	BoA, Natsumi Watanabe	Hara	5:25
12.	"Lose Your Mind featuring Yutaka Furukawa from Doping Panda" (from The Face)	Jonas Jeberg, Simon Brenting, Damon Sharpe, Greg Lawson, Shoko Fujibayashi	Jeberg, Brenting, Sharpe, Lawson	3:21
13.	"Believe in Love feat. BoA (Acoustic Version)" (from Eien/Universe/Believe in Love)	Emi K. Lynn	Ravex	4:28
14.	"Valenti: Best & USA version"	Chinka Yasushi	Hara
15.	"I Did It for Love featuring Sean Garrett"	Sean Garrett, Melvin K. Watson Jr., Matthew I. Irby	Sean Garrett	3:01
16.	"Eat You Up"	Mikkel Johan Sigvardt, Thomas Troelsen	Henrik Jonback	3:11

Best & USA (2CD and 2CD+2DVD version) – CD 1 ("Best") (Tracks 1–9, same as above)
No.	Title	Lyrics	Music	Length
10.	"Sparkling" (from Vivid: Kissing You, Sparkling, Joyful Smile)	Mizue	Hara	3:55
11.	"Key of Heart" (from Made in Twenty (20))	Kenn Kato	h-wonder	5:02
12.	"Make a Secret" (from Outgrow)	Narumi Yamamoto	Masaaki Asada	4:48
13.	"Everlasting" (from Outgrow)	BoA, Natsumi Watanabe	Hara	5:25
14.	"Lose Your Mind featuring Yutaka Furukawa from Doping Panda" (from The Face)	Jonas Jeberg, Simon Brenting, Damon Sharpe, Greg Lawson, Shoko Fujibayashi	Jeberg, Brenting, Sharpe, Lawson	3:21
15.	"Believe in Love feat. BoA (Acoustic Version)" (from Eien/Universe/Believe in Love)	Emi K. Lynn	Ravex	4:28
16.	"Valenti: Best & USA version"	Chinka Yasushi	Hara

Best & USA (2CD and 2CD+2DVD version) – CD 2 ("USA")
No.	Title	Writer(s)	Producer	Length
1.	"I Did It for Love featuring Sean Garrett"	Sean Garrett, Melvin K. Watson Jr., Matthew I. Irby	Sean Garrett	3:01
2.	"Energetic"	Sean Garrett, Yirayah Garcia	Sean Garrett	3:41
3.	"Did Ya"	Christian Karlsson, Pontus Winnberg, Henrik Jonback, Negin Djafari	Bloodshy & Avant	2:59
4.	"Look Who's Talking"	Christian Karlsson, Pontus Winnberg, Henrik Jonback, Michelle Lynn Bell, Britney Spears	Henrik Jonback	3:08
5.	"Eat You Up"	Mikkel Johan Sigvardt, Thomas Troelsen	Henrik Jonback	3:11
6.	"Obsessed"	Troy Verges, Brian Glenn Kennedy, Hillary Lee Lindsey	Brian Kennedy	3:46
7.	"Touched"	Christian Karlsson, Pontus Winnberg, Magnus Wallbert, Toby Gad, Arama Brown	Bloodshy & Avant	3:06
8.	"Scream"	Charlie Mason, Kay J, The Provider	Adrian Newman	3:16
9.	"Girls On Top"	Young-Hu Kim, Lola Fair (Xperimental Music) (English lyrics)	Young Jin Yoo	3:37
10.	"Dress Off"	Adrian Newman	Adrian Newman	3:41
11.	"Hypnotic Dance Floor"	Paolo Galgani, Lisa Rachelle Greene	Henrik Jonback	3:43
Total length:				38:47

DVD 1 (Best & USA 2CD+2DVD)
No.	Title	Length
1.	"Do the Motion"
2.	"Make a Secret"
3.	"Dakishimeru"
4.	"Everlasting"
5.	"Nanairo no Ashita: Brand New Beat"
6.	"Key of Heart"
7.	"Winter Love"
8.	"Sweet Impact"
9.	"Love Letter"
10.	"Lose Your Mind" (featuring Yutaka Furukawa from Doping Panda)
11.	"Be with You."
12.	"Kissing You"
13.	"Sparkling"
14.	"Eien"
15.	"Eien (Dance Version)"

DVD 2 (Best & USA 2CD+2DVD)
No.	Title	Length
1.	"Eat You Up"
2.	"Best & USA Document Film"

== Charts ==
=== Weekly charts ===
Chart (2009)	Peak position
Japanese Albums (Oricon)	2
Taiwanese Albums (G-Music)	2
Taiwanese East Asian Albums (G-Music)	1

=== Monthly charts ===
Chart (2009)	Peak position
Japanese Albums (Oricon)	12

=== Year-end charts ===
Chart (2009)	Position
Japanese Albums (Oricon)	58

== Sales and certifications ==
Region	Certification	Certified units/sales
Japan (RIAJ)	Gold	133,000
