= BoA albums discography =

South Korean musician discography

BoA discography
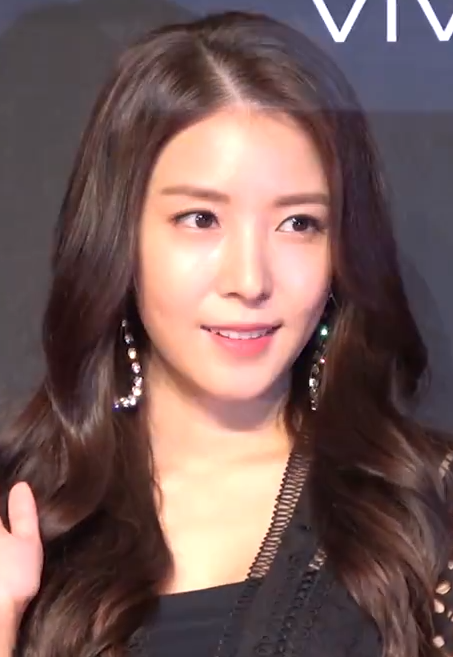
- BoA in 2018
- Studio albums: 21
- Extended plays: 3
- Live albums: 2
- Compilation albums: 8
- Singles: 76
- Remix albums: 2

The discography of South Korean musician BoA consists of twenty-one studio albums (three of which were reissued), eight compilation albums, three extended plays (EPs) and numerous singles. BoA debuted as a musician through South Korean talent agency SM Entertainment at the age of 13 with the album ID; Peace B (2000), followed by her debut in Japan with Avex Trax in 2001.

BoA has seen commercial success in both South Korea and Japan. Her first two Japanese albums, Listen to My Heart (2002) and Valenti (2003), were both certified for one million copies shipped by the Recording Industry Association of Japan, and her second Korean album No. 1 (2002) sold over 500,000 copies in South Korea. Many of her songs have been released bilingually in both territories, such as "Valenti" (2002), "Double" (2003), "Everlasting" (2006) and "Only One" (2013).

After releasing her fifth Korean album Girls on Top in 2005, BoA focused her activities on Japan, releasing the albums Outgrow (2006), Made in Twenty (20) (2007) and The Face (2008). In 2008, BoA made her debut in the United States with the single "Eat You Up", followed by the album BoA (2009). In 2010, BoA released her first Korean language album in five years, Hurricane Venus.

== Studio albums ==
=== Korean studio albums ===
List of Korean studio albums, showing selected details, selected chart positions, and sales figures
Title	Details	Peak chart positions						Sales
Title	Details	KOR (Note: The Gaon Album Chart was established in 2010, and rebranded to the Circle Album Chart in 2022. Positions prior to this refer to the albums' ranking on the monthly domestic Music Industry Association of Korea positions, the predecessor to Gaon/Circle.) (Note: Positions for the domestic Music Industry Association of Korea chart are as follows: ID; Peace B (with estimated sales of 124,470, ID; Peace B would have been the third most sold album on September, after Jo Sungmo's Let Me Love (1,705,127) and Sharp's The Four Letter Word Love (158,509)), Jumping into the World, No. 1, Miracle, Atlantis Princess, Shine We Are!, My Name, Girls on Top,) (Note: Week references for Gaon/Circle: Identity, Hurricane Venus, Only One, Who's Back?, Kiss My Lips, Woman, Crazier.)	JPN	SGP	TWN	TWN East Asia (Note: Positions were taken from 2005 week 31 for Girls on Top, 2006 week 7 for Outgrow, 2007 week 6 for Made in Twenty (20), 2008 week 11 for The Face, 2008 week 23 for "Vivid", 2009 week 10 for "Eien", 2009 week 14 for Best & USA, 2009 week 44 for "Bump Bump", 2009 week 51 for "Mamoritai", 2010 week 9 for Identity, 2010 week 33 for "Woo Weekend", 2010 week 28 for Hurricane Venus, 2011 week 52 for "Milestone", 2012 week 37 for Only One, 2013 week 12 for "Only One", 2013 week 29 for "Tail of Hope", 2013 week 46 for "Message/Call My Name", 2014 week 14 for "Shout It Out", 2014 week 40 for Who's Back?, 2015 week 1 for "Fly", Kiss My Lips.)	US World	Sales
ID; Peace B	Released: August 25, 2000; Label: SM Entertainment; Formats: CD, digital download	16	30	—	—	—	—	KOR: 178,000; JPN: 13,000
No. 1	Released: April 14, 2002; Label: SM Entertainment; Formats: CD, digital download	1	21	—	—	—	—	KOR: 560,000; JPN: 14,000
Atlantis Princess	Released: May 30, 2003; Label: SM Entertainment; Formats: CD, digital download	1	—	4	—	—	—	KOR: 345,000
My Name	Released: June 15, 2004; Label: SM Entertainment; Formats: CD, CD/DVD, digital download	1	151	7	—	—	—	KOR: 201,000; JPN: 3,000
Girls on Top	Released: June 23, 2005; August 17, 2005 (Moto); Label: SM Entertainment; Formats: CD, CD/DVD, digital download	3	153	—	12	3	—	KOR: 113,000; JPN: 3,000
Hurricane Venus	Released: August 5, 2010; September 24, 2010 (Copy & Paste); Label: SM Entertainment; Formats: CD, digital download	1	178	—	14	3	—	KOR: 56,000; JPN: 2,000
Only One	Released: July 25, 2012; Label: SM Entertainment; Formats: CD, digital download	2	63	—	11	2	12	KOR: 36,000; JPN: 3,200
Kiss My Lips	Released: May 12, 2015; Label: SM Entertainment; Formats: CD, digital download	5	147	—	—	10	6	KOR: 15,234; JPN: 1,000
Woman	Released: October 24, 2018; Label: SM Entertainment; Formats: CD, digital download, streaming	6	—	—	—	—	11	KOR: 8,537
Better	Released: December 1, 2020; Label: SM Entertainment; Formats: LP, CD, cassette, digital download, streaming	9	117	—	—	—	—	KOR: 17,371; JPN: 1,000
Crazier	Released: August 4, 2025; Label: SM Entertainment; Formats: LP, CD, digital download, streaming	14	—	—	—	—	—	KOR: 15,168

=== Japanese studio albums ===
List of Japanese studio albums, showing selected details, selected chart positions, sales figures, and certifications
Title	Details	Peak chart positions					Sales	Certifications
Title	Details	KOR (Note: The Gaon Albums Chart was established in 2010. Positions prior to this refer to the albums' ranking on the monthly domestic Music Industry Association of Korea positions, the predecessor to Gaon.)	JPN	SGP	TWN	TWN East Asia	Sales	Certifications
Listen to My Heart	Released: March 13, 2002; Label: Avex Trax; Formats: CD, digital download	5 (Note: Charted on the monthly international RIAK chart.)	1	4	—	—	JPN: 932,000; KOR: 13,000	RIAJ: Million
Valenti	Released: January 29, 2003; Label: Avex Trax; Formats: CD, CD/DVD, digital download	1 (Note: Charted on the monthly international RIAK chart.)	1	—	—	—	JPN: 1,249,197; KOR: 18,000	RIAJ: Million
Love & Honesty	Released: January 15, 2004; Label: Avex Trax; Formats: CD, CD/DVD, digital download	2 (Note: Charted on the monthly international RIAK chart.)	1	9	—	—	JPN: 653,630; KOR: 19,830	RIAJ: 3× Platinum
Outgrow	Released: February 15, 2006; Label: Avex Trax; Formats: CD, CD/DVD, digital download	1 (Note: Charted on the monthly international RIAK chart.)	1	—	7	1	JPN: 427,000; KOR: 23,000	RIAJ: 2× Platinum
Made in Twenty (20)	Released: January 11, 2007; Label: Avex Trax; Formats: CD, CD/DVD, digital download	1 (Note: Charted on the monthly international RIAK chart.)	1	—	6	1	JPN: 348,000; KOR: 17,000	RIAJ: Platinum
The Face	Released: February 27, 2008; Label: Avex Trax; Formats: CD, CD/DVD, digital download	3 (Note: Charted on the monthly international RIAK chart.)	1	—	2	1	JPN: 185,388; KOR: 11,145	RIAJ: Platinum
Identity	Released: February 10, 2010; Label: Avex Trax; Formats: CD, CD/DVD, digital download	6	4	—	6	2	JPN: 72,000	
Who's Back?	Released: September 3, 2014; Label: Avex Trax; Formats: CD, CD/DVD, digital download	19	7	—	13	1	JPN: 17,400; KOR: 600	
Watashi Kono Mama de Ii no Kana	Released: February 14, 2018; Label: Avex Trax; Formats: CD, CD/DVD, digital download	—	13	—	—	—	JPN: 8,242	
"—" denotes items which were released before the creation of the listed charts, or items that did not chart.

=== English studio albums ===
List of English studio albums, showing selected details, selected chart positions, and sales figures
Title	Details	Peak chart positions					Sales	Certifications
Title	Details	KOR	JPN	US	US Dance	US Heat	Sales	Certifications
BoA	Released: March 17, 2009 (USA); Label: SM Entertainment USA; Formats: CD, digital download	76	2 (Note: Released as a part of the Best & USA set.)	127	5	3	US: 8,000	RIAJ: Gold

== Compilation albums ==
List of compilation albums, showing selected details, selected chart positions, sales figures, and certifications
Title	Details	Peak chart positions					Sales	Certifications
Title	Details	KOR	JPN	SGP	TWN	TWN East Asia	Sales	Certifications
K-pop Selection	Released: March 3, 2004 (JPN); Label: Avex Trax; Formats: CD, digital download	—	13	—	—	—	JPN: 34,000	
Best of Soul	Released: February 2, 2005 (JPN); Label: Avex Trax; Formats: CD, CD/DVD, digital download	1 (Note: Charted on the monthly international RIAK chart.)	1	1	—	—	JPN: 1,099,720; KOR: 37,604	RIAJ: Million
BoA Best Single	Released: November 2006 (JPN); Label: China Musicians Audio & Video Press; Formats: CD/VCD	—	—	—	—	—		
Best & USA	Released: March 18, 2009 (JPN); Label: Avex Trax; Formats: CD, 2CD/DVD, digital download	— (Note: Released as a single disc of Japanese material in South Korea as Best II. In 2010, it recharted on the Gaon international albums chart at number 91.)	2	—	2	1	JPN: 133,000	RIAJ: Gold
BoA Summer Selection 2011	Released: August 31, 2011 (JPN); Label: Avex Trax; Formats: Digital download	—	—	—	—	—		
Winter Ballad Collection 2013	Released: October 23, 2013 (JPN); Label: Avex Trax; Formats: Digital download	—	—	—	—	—		
BoA Winter Ballad Collection 2014	Released: December 10, 2014 (JPN); Label: Avex Trax; Formats: Digital download	—	—	—	—	—		
The Greatest	Released: May 30, 2022 (JPN); Label: Avex Trax; Formats: LP, CD, digital download, streaming	—	29	—	—	—	JPN: 3,338	
"—" denotes items which were released before the creation of the listed charts, or items that were ineligible to chart due to their format.

== Special albums ==
=== Korean ===
List of Korean special albums, showing selected details, selected chart positions, and sales figures
Title	Details	Peak chart positions		Sales
Title	Details	KOR	JPN	Sales
Jumping into the World	Released: March 3, 2001; Label: SM Entertainment; Formats: CD, digital download	6	29	KOR: 91,000; JPN: 13,000
Miracle	Released: September 24, 2002; Label: SM Entertainment; Formats: CD, digital download	4	—	KOR: 313,597
Shine We Are!	Released: December 4, 2003; Label: SM Entertainment; Formats: CD, digital download	3	—	KOR: 81,000
"—" denotes a title that did not chart, was not released in that territory or was not eligible to chart due to being a digitally exclusive release.

=== Japanese ===
List of Japanese special albums showing selected details
Title	Details
Merry Christmas from BoA	Released: December 7, 2005; Label: Avex Trax; Formats: digital download
Unchained	Released: March 14, 2018; Label: Avex Trax; Formats: CD, digital download

== Remix albums ==
List of remix albums, showing selected details, selected chart positions, sales figures, and certifications
Title	Details	Peak chart positions	Sales	Certifications
Title	Details	JPN	Sales	Certifications
Peace B. Remixes	Released: August 7, 2002 (JPN); Label: Avex Trax; Formats: CD, digital download	18	JPN: 62,000	
Next World	Released: August 27, 2003 (JPN); Label: Avex Trax; Formats: CD, digital download	4	JPN: 194,000	RIAJ: Platinum

== Live albums ==
List of live albums showing selected details
Title	Details
Shidaz Presents BoA "Winter Love" X'mas Live	Released: January 10, 2007; Label: Avex Trax; Formats: digital download
BoA Live Tour 2008 The Face	Released: October 23, 2013; Label: Avex Trax; Formats: digital download
BoA the Live Ura BoA... Kikase Kei	Released: March 18, 2009; Label: Avex Trax; Formats: DVD
BoA Arena Tour 2007 Made in Twenty (20)	Released: March 18, 2009; Label: Avex Trax; Formats: DVD
BoA the Live 2009 X'mas	Released: March 3, 2010; Label: Avex Trax; Formats: DVD
BoA Live Tour 2010 Identity	Released: August 18, 2010; Label: Avex Trax; Formats: DVD
BoA the Live 2010 X'mas	Released: April 5, 2011; Label: Avex Trax; Formats: DVD
BoA the Live 2011 X'mas the 10th Anniversary Edition	Released: March 7, 2012; Label: Avex Trax; Formats: DVD
BoA the Live 2014 ～Who's Back?～	Released: February 25, 2015; Label: Avex Trax; Formats: DVD, Blu-ray
BoA Special Live Nowness in Japan	Released: May 30, 2016; Label: Avex Trax; Formats: DVD, Blu-ray
BoA the Live 2018 ～Unchained～	Released: October 10, 2018; Label: Avex Trax; Formats: DVD, Blu-ray
BoA the Live 2018 "X'mas"	Released: August 7, 2019; Label: Avex Trax; Formats: CD+DVD
BoA Live Tour 2019 #Mood	Released: February 20, 2020; Label: Avex Trax; Formats: DVD, Blu-ray

== Extended plays ==
=== Korean extended plays ===
List of Korean extended plays, showing selected details, selected chart positions, and sales figures
Title	EP details	Peak chart positions			Sales
Title	EP details	KOR	JPN Dig.	US World	Sales
One Shot, Two Shot	Released: February 20, 2018 (Note: One Shot, Two Shot was released digitally on February 20, 2018, and physically on February 21, 2018); Label: SM Entertainment; Formats: CD, digital download, streaming	6	—	7	KOR: 9,628
Starry Night	Released: December 11, 2019; Label: SM Entertainment; Formats: CD, digital download, streaming	6	—	—	KOR: 8,817
Forgive Me	Released: November 22, 2022; Label: SM Entertainment; Formats: CD, digital download, streaming	6	21	—	KOR: 18,010
"—" denotes releases that did not chart or were not released in that region.

=== Japanese extended plays ===
List of Japanese extended plays showing selected details
Title	Details
Hohaba (歩幅)	Released: November 5, 2026; Label: BApal; Formats: CD, digital download, streaming
