= Eien / Universe / Believe in Love =

Single by BoA

from the album Best & USA
- Released: February 18, 2009
- Recorded: 2009
- Genre: Dance-pop; Hip-hop
- Label: Avex Trax
- Producers: Bloodshy & Avant; Daisuke "D.I" Imai; Ravex

BoA singles chronology
"Eat You Up" (2008)	"Eien / Universe / Believe in Love" (2009)	"I Did It For Love" (2009)

Crystal Kay singles chronology
"One" (2008)	"Eien / Universe / Believe in Love" (2009)	"After Love: First Boyfriend/Girlfriend" (2009)

M-Flo singles chronology
"Love Song" (2006)	"Eien / Universe / Believe in Love" (2009)

"Eien / Universe / Believe in Love" (永遠/Universe feat. Crystal Kay&Verbal(M-Flo)/Believe in LOVE feat. BoA) is BoA's twenty-seventh Japanese single. It was released on February 18, 2009 in two formats, CD-only and CD+DVD. The CD edition also comes in a first press limited edition. Following "Eien", the second A-side, "Universe", features fellow J-pop singer Crystal Kay and label mate, Verbal of M-Flo. The third A-side is the acoustic version of Ravex's single "Believe in Love", which features BoA. The 4th track on the Limited Edition version of the single, Best Hit Mega Blend [Limited Edition Bonus Track], is a mashup of multiple of her best hits in Japan.

== Track listing ==
Regular edition
No.	Title	Lyrics	Music	Length
1.	"Eien (永遠, lit. Eternity)"	Narumi Yamamoto	Daisuke "D.I" Imai	4:30
2.	"Universe" (feat. Crystal Kay & Verbal (M-Flo))	Kumo, Verbal	Christian Karlsson, Pontus Winnberg, Henrik Jonback, So Shy, Magnus Wallbert, Balewa Mohammad,	4:22
3.	"Believe in Love (Acoustic Version) feat. BoA"	Emi K. Lynn	Ravex	4:28

Limited edition
No.	Title	Length
4.	"Best Hit Mega Blend"	4:56

Regular edition
No.	Title	Length
4.	"Eien (Instrumental)"
5.	"Universe (Instrumental)"
6.	"Introduction of Best & USA"

DVD
No.	Title	Length
1.	"Eien: Music Video"
2.	"Introduction of Best & USA"

Limited DVD
No.	Title	Length
3.	"Best Mega Hits Blend: Visual Remix"

== Live performances ==
1. 04/06 - Music Station (Eien)
2. 04/09 - NHK BShi (Eien) (with I Did It for Love, Meri Kuri)
3. 04/29 - Gekkan Melodix! (Eien)

== Charts ==
Oricon Sales Chart (Japan)

Chart	Peak position	Sales total	Chart Run
Oricon Daily Singles Chart	5		
Oricon Weekly Singles Chart	8	22,354	5 weeks

== Certifications ==
- "Eien"

Chart	Amount
RIAJ full-length cellphone downloads	Gold (100,000+)
