= Love Letter (BoA song) =

Single by BoA

from the album The Face
- B-side: "Diamond Heart" "Beautiful Flowers"
- Released: September 26, 2007
- Recorded: 2007
- Genre: J-pop; dance-pop
- Length: 5:02
- Label: Avex Trax
- Composer(s): Yoko Kuzuya
- Lyricist(s): BoA

BoA singles chronology
"Sweet Impact" (2007)	"Love Letter" (2007)	"Lose Your Mind" (2007)

"Love Letter" is a song by South Korean singer BoA, serving as her 23rd Japanese single. Alongside the title track are two B-sides: "Beautiful Flowers" and "Diamond Heart". The original release date for this single was September 19, 2007, but it was pushed back a week to September 26 after the news of Ayumi Hamasaki's latest single, "Talkin' 2 Myself", was scheduled for release the same week.

== Background ==
"Love Letter" was composed by Yoko Kuzuya, who also composed BoA's "Do the Motion" and Koda Kumi's "You" (2005); BoA also participated in writing the lyrics. The music video for the song was released a month before the official single on August 29, 2007. It was filmed in early August as suggested through a post on her Japanese blog dated August 10. It was directed by Kensuke Kawamura, who also served as the director for her single "Make a Secret" in addition to videos for other artists including Namie Amuro, Kumi Koda and Mika Nakashima.

== Release ==
On July 24, 2007, the title and release date of the single were first revealed, followed by the release of jacket photos and lyricist/composer information a week later on BoA's official homepage. On August 17, it was announced the release date of "Love Letter", which was initially set for September 19, had been moved to September 26, 2007.

"Beautiful Flowers" was chosen as the theme song for Japan's Central League baseball team Yokohama BayStars. "Diamond Heart" was promoted during the summer of 2007 on commercials for the Toshiba W53T, featuring BoA herself. On May 9, 2022, a re-recorded version of "Love Letter" with new acoustic instrumentations was released for her 20th anniversary compilation album The Greatest (2022).

== Track listings ==
- Japanese CD single – First Press Edition
1. "Love Letter" – 5:02
2. "Diamond Heart" – 4:12
3. "Beautiful Flowers" – 3:30
4. "Love Letter" (Winter Acoustic Mix) – 5:08
5. "Love Letter" (Instrumental) – 5:02
6. "Diamond Heart" (Instrumental) – 4:12
7. "Beautiful Flowers" (Instrumental) – 3:30
- Japanese CD single – Regular Edition
1. "Love Letter" – 5:02
2. "Diamond Heart" – 4:12
3. "Beautiful Flowers" – 3:30
4. "Love Letter" (Instrumental) – 5:02
5. "Diamond Heart" (Instrumental) – 4:12
6. "Beautiful Flowers" (Instrumental) – 3:30
- Japanese DVD
1. "Love Letter" (Music Clip)

== Charts ==
=== Daily and weekly charts ===
Chart (2007)	Peak position
Japan Daily Singles (Oricon)	2
Japan Weekly Singles (Oricon)	3

== Certifications ==
Region	Certification	Certified units/sales
Japan (Oricon) Physical	—	44,000
Japan (RIAJ) Digital	Gold	100,000^{*}
^{*} Sales figures based on certification alone.
