= Energetic (BoA song) =

Single by BoA

from the album BoA: Deluxe
- Released: July 21, 2009
- Recorded: 2009
- Genre: Synthpop; electropop; dance; urban pop
- Length: 3:40 (Album Version); 3:25 (Radio Edit)
- Label: SM Entertainment USA
- Songwriter(s): Sean Garrett; Yirayah Garcia
- Producer(s): Sean Garrett; Clubba Langg

BoA singles chronology
"Mamoritai: White Wishes" (2009)	"Energetic" (2009)	"Woo Weekend" (2010)

Music video
- "Energetic" on YouTube

"Energetic" is a song recorded by South Korean singer BoA, released for her debut English repackage album BoA: Deluxe on July 21, 2009. A CD remix edition of "Energetic" was additionally released in January 2010. Commercially, the song debuted at number 48 on the Billboard Hot Dance Club Songs chart before peaking at number 17.

== Music video ==
The music video for "Energetic" was shot between June 3, 2009 and June 5, 2009. It features BoA with her back-up dancers hitting a club, and becoming the center of the club. "Energetic" was the first video to be on BoA's official YouTube-channel, along with "I Did It for Love", on November 25, 2009.

== Track listing ==
Digital single – tracklist

1. "Energetic" (radio edit) – 3:25
2. "Energetic" (album version) – 3:40

Remixes CD – tracklist

1. "Energetic" (Mike Rizzo Funk Generation radio edit)
2. "Energetic" (Razor N Guido radio edit)
3. "Energetic" (radio edit)
4. "Energetic" (Mike Rizzo Funk Generation club mix)
5. "Energetic" (Mike Rizzo Funk Generation dub mix)
6. "Energetic" (Razor N Guido club mix)
7. "Energetic" (Razor N Guido dub)
8. "Energetic" (Razor N Guido instrumental)

== Charts ==
Weekly charts
Chart (2009)	Peak position
US Dance Club Songs (Billboard)	17
