= Girl in the Mirror =

Girl in the Mirror may refer to:

- "Girl in the Mirror", a song by BoA from The Face, 2008
- "Girl in the Mirror", a song by Bebe Rexha from UglyDolls, 2019
- "Girl in the Mirror", a song by Britney Spears from Oops!... I Did It Again, 2000
- "Girl in the Mirror", a song by Cheryl from A Million Lights, 2012
- "Girl in the Mirror", a song by Rita Ora from You & I, 2023
- "Girl in the Mirror", a song by Sophia Grace, 2016
