= Tezuka (surname) =

Tezuka (手塚, "hand mound" or 手束, "hand bundle") is a Japanese surname. Notable people with the surname include:

- Chiharu Tezuka (手塚 ちはる, born 1974), Japanese voice actor
- Katsumi Tezuka (手塚 勝巳, 1912–?), Japanese actor
- Machiko Tezuka (手束 真知子, born 1986), Japanese gravure idol and bikini model
- Makoto Tezuka (手塚 眞, born 1961), Japanese film and anime director
- Osamu Tezuka (手塚 治虫, 1928–1989), Japanese manga artist
- Remi Tezuka (手塚 玲美, born 1980), Japanese tennis player
- Satoshi Tezuka (手塚 聡, born 1958), former Japanese soccer player
- Takashi Tezuka (手塚 卓志, born 1960), Japanese video game designer
- Tsuyoshi Tezuka (手塚 強, born 1975), Japanese race car driver
- Yoshio Tezuka (手塚仁雄, born 1966), Japanese politician

== Fictional characters ==
- Kunimitsu Tezuka (手塚 国光) of The Prince of Tennis
- Rin Tezuka (手塚 琳) of Katawa Shoujo
- Beth Tezuka of Bravest Warriors
- Miyuki Tezuka of Kamen Rider Ryuki

== See also ==
- Tezuka Award
- Tezuka Productions
- Tezuka Osamu Cultural Prize
- 3998 Tezuka, main-belt asteroid
- Ravex in Tezuka World Japanese 2009 anime short film
