= Mamoritai (White Wishes) =

Single by BoA

from the album Identity
- B-side: "The End Soshite And..."
- Released: December 9, 2009
- Recorded: 2009
- Genre: J-pop
- Label: Avex Trax
- Lyricist(s): Mizue
- Producer(s): Hiroo Yamaguchi

BoA singles chronology
"Bump Bump!" (2009)	"Mamoritai (White Wishes)" (2009)	"Energetic" (2010)

"Mamoritai (White Wishes)" (まもりたい ～White Wishes～, lit. Want to Protect (White Wishes)) is a song by South Korean recording artist BoA, serving as her twenty-ninth Japanese single under Avex Trax. It was released for her seventh Japanese album Identity on December 9, 2009. It was released in three formats: Limited Tales of Graces Edition, CD-only and CD+DVD.

== Background ==
On September 26, 2009, "Mamoritai (White Wishes)" was revealed to be the theme song for Tales of Graces at the Tokyo Game Show 2009 held at Makuhari Messe in Chiba. Three versions were released simultaneously on December 9, 2009: a CD+DVD version, a CD only version, and a Tales of Graces Edition (limited time production).

== Live performances ==
BoA performed "Mamoritai (White Wishes)" on a Christmas songs special on October 10, 2009. In December 2009, she added it to the set list of her BoA The Live 2009 X'mas concerts in Tokyo and Osaka and performed it on Music Fighter on December 11. On February 19, 2010, she performed the song on Music Station.

== Usage in media ==
"Mamoritai (White Wishes)" was featured as the theme song of the game Tales of Graces, which was released in Japan one day after the single.

== Track list ==
CD only edition
No.	Title	Lyrics	Music	Length
1.	"Mamoritai (White Wishes)"	Mizue	Hiroo Yamaguchi	3:33
2.	"The End Soshite And..."	BoA	BoA	5:53
3.	"Bump Bump! feat. Verbal(M-Flo) KOZM・Mix (First Press CD Only Bonus Track)"	Verbal	Verbal	4:05
4.	"Mamoritai (White Wishes) (Instrumental)"	Mizue	Hiroo Yamaguchi	3:33
5.	"The End Soshite And... (Instrumental)"	BoA	BoA	5:53

DVD
No.	Title	Length
1.	"Mamoritai (White Wishes) (Music Video)"
2.	"Mamoritai (White Wishes) (Making Clip) ~ (First Press CD+DVD Bonus Video)"

Tales of Graces version
No.	Title	Lyrics	Music	Length
1.	"Mamoritai (White Wishes)"	Mizue	Hiroo Yamaguchi	3:33
2.	"Mamoritai (White Wishes) (Tales of Graces Version)"	Mizue	Hiroo Yamaguchi	2:18
3.	"Mamoritai (White Wishes) (English Version)"	EMI K.Lynn	Hiroo Yamaguchi	3:33
4.	"Mamoritai (White Wishes) (Instrumental)"	Mizue	Hiroo Yamaguchi	3:33
5.	"Best Hit Mega Blend"			4:56
6.	"Tales of Graces × Mamoritai (White Wishes) [Special Movie (CD-Extra)]"

== Charts ==
Chart (2009)	Peak position
Japan (Japan Hot 100)	4
Japan (Oricon)	3

== Sales and certifications ==
Region	Certification	Certified units/sales
Japan (Oricon) Physical	—	50,613
Japan (RIAJ) Chaka-Uta Full	Gold	100,000^{*}
^{*} Sales figures based on certification alone.
