= Believe in Love (song) =

- CD only and digital download editions' cover

Single by Ravex

from the album Best & USA and Trax
- Released: February 8, 2009
- Recorded: 2008
- Genre: Big beat, house
- Length: 4:50
- Label: Avex Trax
- Songwriters: Emi K. Lynn, Ravex
- Producer: Ravex

Ravex singles chronology
"I Rave U" (2008)	"Believe in Love" (2009)

"Believe in Love" is a song by Japanese dance music project Ravex, featuring South Korean singer BoA. On February 18, 2009, the original version of the song was simultaneously released with an acoustic version of the song, found on BoA's "Eien / Universe / Believe in Love" single.

== Background and development ==
Ravex was a three-person unit, consisting of dance musicians Shinichi Osawa, Tomoyuki Tanaka (otherwise known as Fantastic Plastic Machine) and Taku Takahashi of M-Flo, to celebrate the 20th anniversary of the Avex Group record label. The first single from this project was "I Rave U" (2008), featuring DJ Ozma.

BoA had collaborated with Osawa previously in 2002, on his single "Everything Needs Love" under the name Mondo Grosso, and had worked with Takahashi in 2004, when she appeared on M-Flo's single "The Love Bug".

The single features three songs: the B-side is a collaboration with Maki Goto, her first release under the Avex Trax label after parting with Hello! Project, as well as "Mega Ravex", a megamix of songs that would later appear of Ravex's debut album Trax.

BoA's acoustic version was backed by Brazilian guitarist Shigeharu Sasagao. This version was found on her "Eien / Universe / Believe in Love", and was added to her Best & USA compilation album a month later.

== Critical reception ==
CDJournal described the song as "a full-scale painful heart-string pulling song". For BoA's acoustic version, they noted that Sasagao's guitar accompaniment made the song into a "shining bossa-style ballad".

== Track listings ==
Digital download
No.	Title	Lyrics	Music	Length
1.	"Believe in Love" (featuring BoA)	Emi K. Lynn	Ravex	4:50
Total length:				4:50

Physical single
No.	Title	Lyrics	Music	Length
1.	"Believe in Love" (featuring BoA)	Emi K. Lynn	Ravex	4:50
2.	"Golden Luv" (featuring Maki Goto)	Boo	Ravex	4:22
3.	"Mega Ravex" (featuring Anna Tsuchiya, BoA, DJ Ozma, Lisa, Maki Goto, Monkey Majik, Tohoshinki, TRF & Yuko Ando)	Lisa, Emi K.Lynn, Fantastic Plastic Machine, Lynne Hobday, DJ Ozma, Boo, Blaise, Maynard, Tetsuya Komuro, Verbal, Yuko Ando	Ravex	6:50
Total length:				16:02

== Charts ==
Chart (2009)	Peak position
Japan Billboard Hot Singles Sales	43
Japan Oricon weekly singles	35

=== Sales ===
Chart	Amount
Oricon physical sales	3,000

== Release history ==
Region	Date	Format	Distributing Label	Catalogue codes
Japan	February 8, 2009	digital download	Avex Trax	
Japan	February 18, 2009	CD, CD/DVD	Avex Trax	AVCD-31594B, AVCD-31595
