= BoA (album) =

Studio album by BoA
- Released: March 17, 2009
- Recorded: 2008–2009
- Genres: Pop; R&B; dance-pop; electropop
- Length: 38:47 (Standard); 49:00 (Deluxe)
- Language: English
- Labels: SM Entertainment; Arsenal
- Producers: Bloodshy & Avant; Sean Garrett; Henrik Jonback; Brian Kennedy; Clubba Langg; Adrian Newman; The Phantom Boyz; Chief Wakil

BoA chronology
The Face (2008)	BoA (2009)	Best & USA (2009)

Singles from BoA
- 1. "Eat You Up" Released: October 21, 2008; 2. "I Did It for Love" Released: June 2, 2009

Singles from BoA: Deluxe
- 1. "Energetic" Released: July 21, 2009

BoA is the only English studio album (twelfth overall) by South Korean recording artist BoA. The album was released on March 17, 2009, in the United States through SM Entertainment. BoA was released in Japan through Avex Trax the following day and was boxed with her second greatest hits album, Best & USA, as a 2-in-1 CD. The record was originally titled Look Who's Talking, and was recorded at studios across the United States, Australia, and Thailand.

Commercially, BoA became the first album by a South Korean artist to appear on the US Billboard 200, peaking at number 127. It also peaked at number 3 on the US Top Heatseekers and number 5 on the US Dance/Electronic Albums chart. On August 31, 2009, BoA: Deluxe was released digitally via iTunes and included the single version of "Energetic" and two bonus songs: "Crazy About" and "Control". On September 22, 2009, the album was released worldwide.

== Background ==
In January 2008, it was reported that BoA was planning to enter the US market. However, Lee Soo Man, the head of BoA's label SM Entertainment, denied this, saying there was still more work to do in Asia. On August 29, 2008, SM Entertainment announced it had started a subsidiary label in the U.S., SM Entertainment USA. News reports started to surface once again about BoA breaking into the U.S. market. On September 2, 2008, BoA's label officially announced that she would be entering the US market under their subsidiary label. On September 10, a press conference was held at the Seoul Imperial Palace Hotel to further clarify her plans. With the album, BoA hoped to become a "world-renowned entertainer" in the vein of Janet Jackson.

== Production ==
For the album, BoA worked with well-known music producers such as Bloodshy & Avant, Brian Kennedy and Sean Garrett. The recording of the album took place in Thailand, Australia, Atlanta and Los Angeles. On Space Shower Music Update during her interview, BoA said that the album consisted of upbeat songs and the use of a vocoder. The album was originally titled Look Who's Talking.

== Singles ==
During her press conference, SM Entertainment announced "Eat You Up" was chosen to be the lead single from the album. The track was produced by Henrik Jonback (who worked with artists such as Britney Spears and Madonna). "Eat You Up" was released online on October 21, 2008. The single charted on the Billboard Hot Dance Club Play chart peaking at the number 8 spot. "Look Who's Talking" was first performed at MTV World Presents: BoA Live in New York on December 3, 2008. BoA also performed the single at the 2008 Jingle Ball, which was held at the Anaheim Honda Center.

"I Did It for Love" was the second official single from the album. A 1:30 snippet of the song was released online on February 17, 2009, on various websites. The track was written and produced by Sean Garrett, who is featured on the single. The single charted on the Billboard Hot Dance Club Play chart peaking at the number 18 spot. On May 30, before their performance at the 2009 MTV Video Music Awards Japan, BoA and Sean Garrett confirmed in an interview that "Energetic" would be the new single. It is another track written and produced by Sean Garrett, therefore continuing their partnership. According to Kenny Wormald, one of BoA's backup dancers, the music video for Energetic was shot between June 3 and 5, 2009. The music video was released online on July 21, 2009, through EW.com. The single charted on the Billboard Hot Dance Club Play chart at number 17.

== Promotion and live performances ==
In order to promote the album, BoA performed at the YouTube Live Tokyo event in November. A taping was held on December 3, 2008, at the MTV studio in Times Square of a live performance titled MTV World Presents: BoA Live in New York. She performed "Eat You Up", "Look Who's Talking" and the title song of her fifth Korean studio album, Girls on Top. BoA also performed at the 2008 Jingle Ball, as an opening act. She also promoted in South Korea at the 2008 SBS Gayo Daejun. BoA herself told EW.com that she has a "repackaged album [to be] released in September", with the new songs "Control" produced by Brian Kennedy and "Crazy About", produced by Sean Garrett.

== Track listing ==
BoA – Standard edition
No.	Title	Writer(s)	Producer	Length
1.	"I Did It for Love" (featuring Sean Garrett)	Sean Garrett, Melvin K. Watson Jr., Matthew I. Irby	Sean "The Pen" Garrett, The Phantom Boyz	3:01
2.	"Energetic"	Sean Garrett, Yirayah Garcia	Sean "The Pen" Garrett, Clubba Langg	3:41
3.	"Did Ya ^{1}"	Christian Karlsson, Pontus Winnberg, Henrik Jonback, Negin Djafari	Bloodshy & Avant	2:59
4.	"Look Who's Talking"	Christian Karlsson, Pontus Winnberg, Henrik Jonback, Michelle Lynn Bell, Britney Spears	Bloodshy & Avant, Henrik Jonback	3:08
5.	"Eat You Up"	Mikkel Johan Sigvardt, Thomas Troelsen	Henrik Jonback	3:13
6.	"Obsessed"	Brian Seals Kennedy, Troy Verges, Hillary Lee Lindsey	Brian Kennedy, Chief Wakil	3:46
7.	"Touched"	Christian Karlsson, Pontus Winnberg, Magnus Wallbert, Toby Gad, Arama Brown	Bloodshy & Avant	3:06
8.	"Scream ^{2}"	Charlie Mason, Kay J, Apollo Andel, The Provider	Adrian Newman	3:16
9.	"Girls on Top ^{3}"	Young-Hu Kim, Lola Fair (Xperimental Music)	Young Jin Yoo	3:37
10.	"Dress Off"	Adrian Newman	Adrian Newman	3:41
11.	"Hypnotic Dancefloor"	Paolo Galgani, Lisa Rachelle Greene	Henrik Jonback	3:43
Total length:				38:47

BoA – iTunes edition (bonus track)
No.	Title	Writer(s)	Producer	Length
12.	"Eat You Up (DJ Escape & Johnny Vicious Radio Edit)"	Mikkel Johan Sigvardt, Thomas Troelsen	Henrik Jonback	3:38

BoA: Deluxe – Deluxe edition (bonus tracks)
No.	Title	Writer(s)	Producer(s)	Length
1.	"Energetic" (Radio Edit)	Sean Garrett, Yirayah Garcia	Sean "The Pen" Garrett, Clubba Langg	3:25
2.	"Control"	Brian Kennedy, Dwanna Orange, Julian Lowe, Isaiah Freeman	Brian Kennedy	3:00
3.	"Crazy About"	Sean Garrett	Sean Garrett, Davenport & Spencer	3:35

Notes

- The bonus tracks are at the beginning. Tracks 4–14 are the original album, with the original version of "Energetic" moved to track 14.
- ^{1} Remake of "Buddha's Delight" by Haley Bennett from the soundtrack Music and Lyrics: Music from the Motion Picture.
- ^{2} Cover of the 2007 B-side by German girl group Monrose.
- ^{3} English self-cover of the song with the same name from her fifth Korean studio album (2005).

== Personnel ==
- Tom Coyne (Sterling Sound) – audio mastering
- Hoon Jeon (Sonic Korea) – audio mastering [Deluxe version]

== Charts and sales ==
=== Weekly charts ===
Chart (2009, 2011)	Peak position
South Korean Albums (Gaon)	76
US Billboard 200	127
US Dance/Electronic Albums (Billboard)	5
US Independent Albums (Billboard)	16
US Top Heatseekers (Billboard)	3

=== Sales ===
Region	Sales amount
United States	8,000

== Release history ==
Country	Date	Format	Label
United States	March 17, 2009	CD, digital download	SM Entertainment USA/Arsenal/Fontana
Japan	March 18, 2009	CD, digital download	Avex Trax
South Korea	March 18, 2009	CD	SM Entertainment
Canada	March 17, 2009	Digital download	SM Entertainment USA
Canada	April 7, 2009	CD	SM Entertainment USA
Taiwan	April 3, 2009	CD	Avex Asia
Worldwide	August 31, 2009	Digital download	SM Entertainment USA/Arsenal
Worldwide	September 22, 2009	CD	SM Entertainment USA/Arsenal
Philippines	November 18, 2009	CD	Universal Records
