= Ravex in Tezuka World =

- Based on: Osamu Tezuka's Star System
- Music by: Ravex
- Production company: Ravex
- Distributed by: Tezuka Productions
- Release date: November 7, 2009
- Running time: 18 minutes
- Country: Japan
- Languages: Japanese, English

Ravex in Tezuka World is a 2009 18-minute anime short film by Japanese band Ravex. It was featured in the album Trax, celebrating the 20th anniversary of Avex as well as the 80th birthday of Osamu Tezuka.

== Plot ==
As "another story" set after the end of the original manga, the plot starts after Astro is found on an asteroid after his final act to save Earth (shown in the 1960s anime). The robot boy is rescued by the three members of Ravex, and he is miraculously revived by "Space Jack". The newly revived robot is named "Ratom" – built by combining Rock with Astro, and equipped with the power of music.

Professor Ochanomizu works with Space Jack to create the newly evolved Ratom.

== Characters ==
A number of Tezuka characters appeared in the anime short. Main:

- Astro Boy
- Rock Holmes
- Princess Sapphire
- Ravex members (Shinichi Osawa, Taku Takahashi, Tanaka Tomoyuki)

Supporting:

- Pinoko
- Tink
- Hyakkimaru
- Unico
- Melmo
- Black Jack (known as "Space Jack")

== Music ==
1. "Dark Silence"
2. "House Nation feat. Lisa"
3. "Believe in Love feat. BoA"
4. "Just the Two of Us feat. Tohoshinki"
5. "Golden Luv feat. Maki Goto"
6. "1 More Night feat. Monkey Majik"
7. "Bangalicious feat. Anna Tsuchiya"
8. "V.I.P.P. (Very Important Party People) feat. TRF & Verbal (M-Flo)"
9. "I Rave U feat. DJ Ozma"
10. "Waruiko Mitsuketa. (悪い子みつけた。, I Found a Bad Kid.) feat. Yūko Andō"
