= Bump Bump! =

Single by BoA

from the album Identity
- Released: October 28, 2009
- Recorded: 2009
- Genre: J-pop, R&B, hip hop, K-pop
- Length: 17:15
- Label: Avex Trax
- Songwriters: Verbal, Agent Kozel, Minami
- Producer: Verbal

BoA singles chronology
"After Love: First Boyfriend/Girlfriend" (2009)	"Bump Bump!" (2009)	"Mamoritai: White Wishes" (2009)

"Bump Bump!" is BoA's twenty-eighth Japanese single. It was produced by Verbal from M-Flo, who wrote both songs and featured as a rapper on both tracks. The single was released on October 28, 2009.

== Track list ==
=== CD ===
1. Bump Bump! feat. Verbal (4:05)
2. IZM feat. Verbal (4:36)
3. Bump Bump! feat. Verbal (Instrumental) (4:03)
4. IZM feat. Verbal (Instrumental) (4:30)

=== DVD ===
1. Bump Bump! feat. Verbal(M-Flo) Music Video
2. Bump Bump! feat. Verbal(M-Flo) Music Video: Dance Edit (First Press CD+DVD Edition Only)

== Live performances ==
1. 10/25 - Gekkan Melodix!
2. 10/27 - Gekkou Ongaku Dan
3. 10/30 - Music Station
4. 10/31 - Music Fighter
5. 10/31 - Music Japan

== Charts ==
Oricon Sales Chart (Japan)

Chart	Peak position	Sales total	Chart run
Oricon Daily Singles Chart	5		
Oricon Weekly Singles Chart	8	13,898	4 weeks
