= Girls on Top (album) =

Studio album by BoA
- Released: June 23, 2005
- Recorded: 2005
- Studios: SM Yellow Tail Studio; SM Booming System Studio; SM Blue Ocean Studio; K.T. Studio
- Genres: Dance-pop; R&B; pop
- Length: 44:50
- Language: Korean
- Label: SM

BoA chronology
Best of Soul (2005)	Girls on Top (2005)	Merry Christmas from BoA (2005)

Singles from Girls on Top
- 1. "Girls on Top" Released: June 23, 2005; 2. "Moto" Released: August 17, 2005

Girls on Top is the fifth Korean studio album by South Korean recording artist BoA, released through SM Entertainment on June 23, 2005. A repackage of the album, titled Moto, was released on August 17, 2005. The record saw a continuation of BoA's image change that began with her prior album My Name (2004); Girls on Top sought to portray a "mature and self-confident" image with themes expressing female empowerment. In Japan, a special edition of the album including a DVD was released by Avex Trax on March 26, 2008.

Commercially, Girls on Top peaked at number three on the monthly MIAK album chart in South Korea and entered the album charts in Taiwan and Japan. To promote the album, the title tracks "Girls on Top" and "Moto" were released as singles with accompanying music videos. Similar to My Name, the album also received an overseas version including a Mandarin version of the eponymous lead single, "Girls on Top". An English version of the song was also recorded and included on BoA's self-titled debut English studio album BoA (2009).

== Background and release ==
Girls on Top was released as BoA's fifth Korean studio album on June 23, 2005, and showcased a change in BoA's image and musicality compared to her previous releases, which largely consisted of lighter concepts and feminine visuals. The title track "Girls on Top" was promoted as the main single and contains themes of female empowerment. BoA's "bohemian" look on the album cover art aimed to represent "freedom and depth", while the visual for "Autumn Letter" (shown at the end of the music video for "Girls on Top") showcased BoA in traditional Korean fashion, weaving the "idea of Korean womanhood" into her music.

A repackage of the album titled Moto was released on August 17, 2005, and contained one new track "Autumn Letter", a cover of Kim Min-ki's 1993 song of the same name. A Hong Kong and Taiwanese edition of the album containing a Chinese version of "Girls on Top" was released a week later on August 25, in commemoration of BoA's 5th anniversary of debut. In Japan, a special edition release along with a DVD was released by Avex Trax on March 26, 2008. An English version of "Girls on Top" was included on BoA's US debut album in March 2009.

"Girls on Top" contains the message of not tolerating discrimination that is chronically prevalent in our society as the subtle inequalities felt as a woman should disappear from the hearts of all people.

— BoA talking about the themes of the album (Yonhap News)

== Composition ==
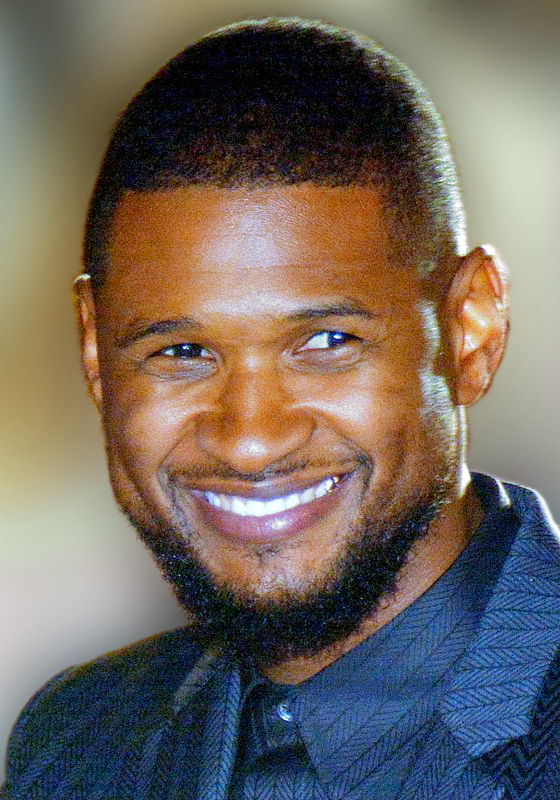
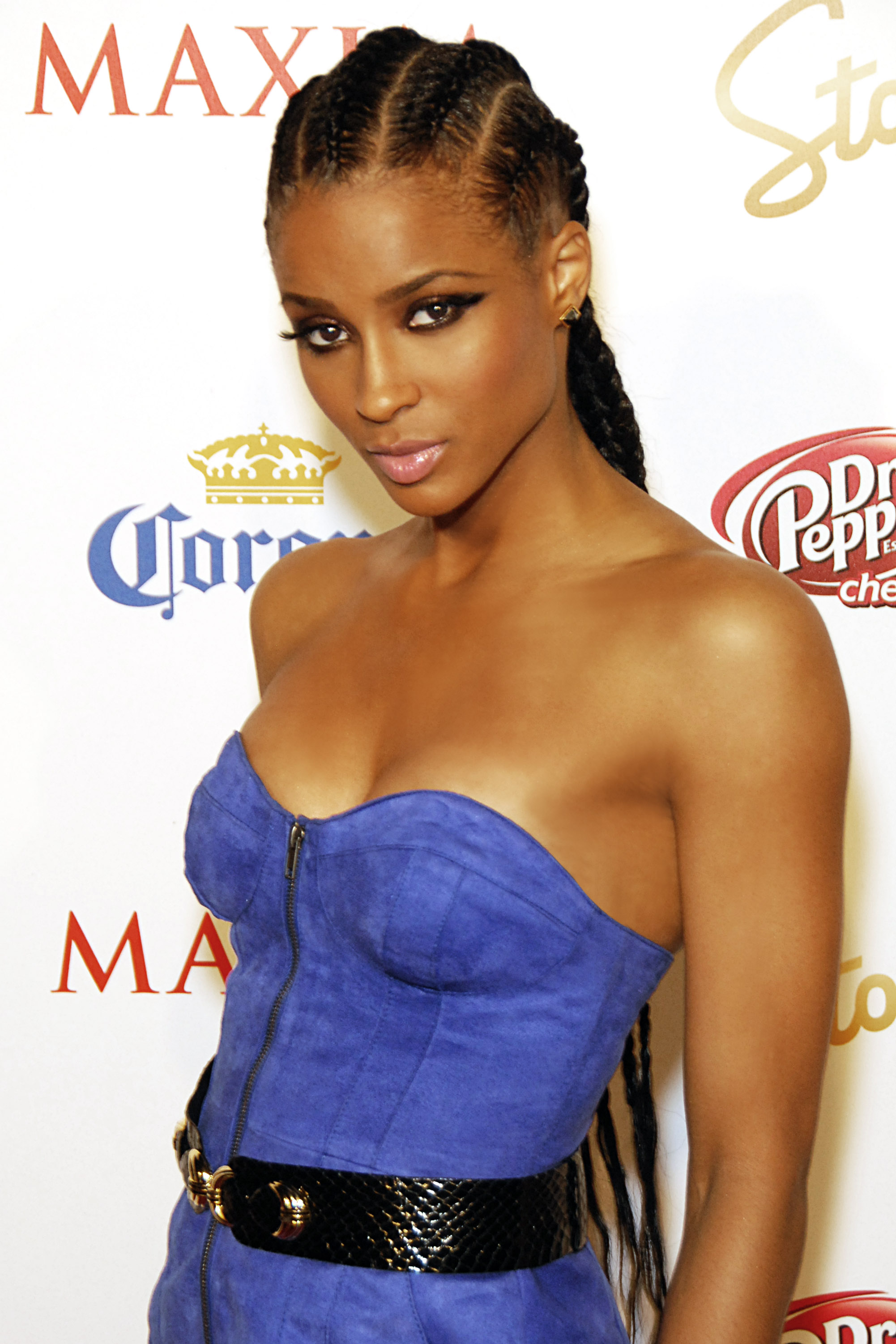
A critic from IZM compared the production of "Girls on Top" to music of Usher (left) and Ciara (right).

"Girls on Top" is a dance and hip-hop number with lyrics revolving around themes of female empowerment and countering male chauvinistic expressions. IZM compared the song's production to that of Usher and Ciara, and felt that the change in styles unveiled a new side of BoA's musically. The publication added that the remake of Kim Min-ki's "Autumn Letter" offered a "feeling of gradual maturity". "Moto" is a R&B and dance number and contains a fast-paced hip-hop rhythm produced by Kenzie, who also composed BoA's "My Name". "Do You Love Me?" is an acid pop number while the song "Garden in the Air" was inspired by the hanging gardens of Babylon. "Can't Let Go" is a R&B ballad containing backup vocals sung by Kangta while other songs such as "If You Were Here"', "Love Can Make a Miracle" and "Breathe Again" are lyrical ballads.

== Reception ==
Commercially, Girls on Top peaked at number three on the monthly domestic Music Industry Association of Korea (MIAK) album sales chart for June 2005, selling 52,558 copies. The album sold a total of 112,954 copies by the end of 2005 and was ranked the 14th best-selling album of the year in South Korea. In Taiwan, the album peaked at number 12 on the G-Music Combo Albums chart and number 3 on the G-Music J-pop Albums chart. In Japan, it peaked at number 153 on the Oricon Albums Chart in 2008.

== Covers and usage in media ==
Girls' Generation covered "Girls on Top" along with "My Name" during a special stage on November 10, 2007. Shinee made a performance of the song during a MBC Star Dance Battle on October 4, 2009, and renamed it "Boys on Top". Oh My Girl and WJSN performed parts of the song at the 2018 Mnet Asian Music Awards. It was performed by Team China on the dance competition television show Stage K in 2019. On July 31, 2020, Baekhyun of Exo released a remake of "Garden in the Air" as part of BoA's 20th anniversary tribute project, titled SM Station: Our Beloved BoA. The release peaked at number 83 on the Gaon Digital Chart.

In 2022, SM Entertainment debuted supergroup Got the Beat as part of a project group titled Girls on Top, which was named after the album and single. The group consisted of BoA herself alongside members of Girls' Generation, Red Velvet and Aespa. At KCON 2023 in Los Angeles, Everglow and Lapillus performed a joint stage and covered "Girls on Top". A remix version of the song was performed on the girl group survival show Universe Ticket.

== Accolades ==
Awards and nominations for "Girls on Top"
Year	Award-giving body	Category	Result	Ref.
2005	Mnet KM Music Video Festival	Best Female Artist	Won	
2005	Mnet KM Music Video Festival	Best Dance Performance	Nominated	

Music program awards for "Girls on Top"
Program	Date	Ref.
Music Camp	July 16, 2005	
Music Camp	July 23, 2005	
M Countdown	July 28, 2005	
Inkigayo	July 17, 2005	
Inkigayo	July 24, 2005	
Inkigayo	July 31, 2005	

== Track listing ==
Girls on Top – Standard edition
No.	Title	Writer(s)	Length
1.	"Moto"	Boa Kwon, Kenzie	3:05
2.	"Do You Love Me?" (둘이 함께; Dul-i Hamkke)	Yoo Young-jin	3:31
3.	"Girls on Top"	Yoo	3:37
4.	"If You Were Here" (오늘 그댈 본다면; Oneul Geudael Bondamyeon)	Joleen Belle, Young-hu Kim	3:38
5.	"Love Can Make a Miracle"	Waeromoe, Samuel, Kwon	3:42
6.	"Addiction"	Jamie Jones, Jin Young-jin	4:04
7.	"Freak in Me"	Yak Bondy, Charlotte Eiram, Kwon	3:26
8.	"Garden in the Air"	Kenzie	3:50
9.	"I Spy"	Hayden Bell, Hong Ji-yoo	3:17
10.	"Can't Let Go"	Deviller Dane, Hosein Sean, Kenzie	3:55
11.	"Heroine" (시선; Siseon)	Shin Ji-won, Vincent Degiorgio	3:08
12.	"Breathe Again" (숨...)	Ha Jung-ho	4:26
Total length:			44:50

Girls on Top – Hong Kong and Taiwan edition (bonus track)
No.	Title	Length
13.	"Girls on Top" (Chinese version)	3:37

Moto – repackage edition
No.	Title	Writer(s)	Length
13.	"Autumn Letter" (가을편지; Gaeulpyeonji)	Kim Min-ki, Ko Eun	0:50

Moto – VCD
No.	Title	Length
1.	"Girls on Top"
2.	"Moto"
3.	"Making of "Girls on Top Music Video"

Girls on Top – Japan special edition (DVD)
No.	Title	Length
1.	"Girls on Top"
2.	"Moto"

== Charts ==
=== Weekly charts ===
Chart (2005)	Peak position
Japanese Albums (Oricon)	153
Taiwanese Albums (G-Music)	12
Taiwanese East Asian Albums (G-Music)	3

=== Monthly charts ===
Chart (2005)	Peak position
South Korean Albums (RIAK)	3

=== Year-end charts ===
Chart (2005)	Position
South Korean Albums (RIAK)	14

== Sales ==
Region	Sales amount
Japan	3,000
South Korea	113,000
