= Trax (album) =

- CD-only edition and digital cover. On the CD+DVD editions, the bottom bar and text are colored blue instead of pink.

Studio album by Ravex
- Released: April 29, 2009
- Genre: Pop; electronic music
- Length: 54:04
- Label: Avex Trax
- Producer: Shinichi Osawa; Tomoyuki Tanaka; Taku Takahashi

Singles from Trax
- 1. "I Rave U" Released: December 17, 2008; 2. "Believe in Love" Released: February 8, 2009

Trax (トラックス, torakkusu) is the debut and only studio album from Japanese electronic music group Ravex, which consists of Shinichi Osawa (also known as Mondo Grosso), Tomoyuki Tanaka (also known as Fantastic Plastic Machine) and M-Flo's member Taku Takahashi. It peaked at number 20 on Oricon Albums Chart.

== Track listings ==
=== CD ===
1. "I Rave U (Original)"
2. "Rock U feat. Namie Amuro"
3. "Just the Two of Us feat. Tohoshinki"
4. "House Nation feat. Lisa"
5. "Bangalicious feat. Anna Tsuchiya"
6. "Believe in Love feat. BoA"
7. "New Eccentric Girl (New エキセントリックガール, Nyū Ekisentorikku Gāru) feat. Chisa (Girl Next Door)"
8. "Golden Luv feat. Maki Goto"
9. "V.I.P.P. (Very Important Party People) feat. TRF & Verbal (M-Flo)"
10. "1 More Night feat. Monkey Majik"
11. "Waruiko Mitsuketa. (悪い子みつけた。, I Found a Bad Kid.) feat. Yūko Andō"
12. "I Rave U feat. DJ Ozma"

=== DVD ===
- "Ravex in Tezuka World" (Tezuka Productions Original Animation)
- "Believe in Love feat. BoA" (Music Video)
- "I Rave U feat. DJ Ozma" (Music Video)
- "Mega Ravex" (Original PV, "Ravex in Tezuka World")
