= Be with You (BoA song) =

"Be with You."

Single by BoA

from the album The Face
- Released: February 20, 2008
- Recorded: 2008
- Genre: J-pop
- Length: 26:03
- Label: Avex Trax

BoA singles chronology
"Lose Your Mind" (2007)	"Be with You." (2008)	"Vivid: Kissing You, Sparkling, Joyful Smile" (2008)

"Be with You." is BoA's twenty-fifth Japanese single. In addition to the title track are "Precious," instrumental versions of both songs, and the spring acoustic mix of "Be with You." The single was released on February 20, 2008. "The Face" was scheduled for release the same day, but was pushed back a week due to strong competition. "Be with You." is a ballad that is the theme song of "Inu to Watashi no 10 no Yakusoku." The single was leaked onto the internet on January 25, 2008.

== Track list ==
=== CD ===
1. Be with You. (5:13)
2. Precious (5:10)
3. Be with You. (Spring Acoustic Mix) (5:17)
4. Be with You. (Instrumental) (5:13)
5. Precious (Instrumental) (5:10)

=== CD extras ===
When the CD was inserted into the computer there were bonus extras.

1. The Face (Special Digest Movie)

== Hong Kong version ==
The Hong Kong edition included 3 more CD extras bonus than the Japanese version did.

1. The Face (Special Digest Movie)- Aggressive
2. Girl in the Mirror
3. Happy Birthday
4. Smile Again

== Charts ==
=== Oricon Sales Chart (Japan) ===
Release	Chart	Peak position	Sales total
February 20, 2008	Oricon Daily Singles Chart	6	
February 20, 2008	Oricon Weekly Singles Chart	13	18,587

=== Billboard (Japan) ===
Release	Chart	Peak position
February 20, 2008	Billboard Japan Hot 100	8
