= Tales of Graces =

2009 role-playing video game

- Japanese Wii box art
- Developer: Namco Tales Studio (Note: Remaster developed by Tose.)
- Publisher: Namco Bandai Games (Note: Under the Namco label.)
- Director: Kazuya Ishizuka
- Producer: Hideo Baba
- Designer: Tatsurou Udou
- Programmer: Ryuichi Ishizawa
- Artist: Mutsumi Inomata
- Writer: Daisuke Kiga
- Composers: Motoi Sakuraba; Shinji Tamura
- Series: Tales
- Engine: Unity (Remastered)
- Platforms: Wii; Tales of Graces f PlayStation 3 Tales of Graces f Remastered; Nintendo Switch; PlayStation 4 PlayStation 5 Xbox One; Xbox Series X/S; Windows
- Release: Wii: JP: December 10, 2009; Tales of Graces f PlayStation 3: JP: December 2, 2010; NA: March 13, 2012; EU: August 31, 2012; Tales of Graces f Remastered; Nintendo Switch, PlayStation 4, PlayStation 5, Xbox One, Xbox Series X/S, Windows: WW: January 17, 2025
- Genre: Action role-playing
- Modes: Single player, multiplayer

Tales of Graces is an action role-playing video game developed by Namco Tales Studio and published by Namco Bandai Games for the Wii. It was initially only released in Japan in December 2009. It is the twelfth main installment of the Tales series. The game was ported to the PlayStation 3 under the title Tales of Graces f (Note: Japanese: テイルズ オブ グレイセス エフ, Hepburn: Teiruzu Obu Gureisesu Efu) and was released in Japan in December 2010. The PlayStation 3 version was localized and released in English in 2012. A remastered version, Tales of Graces f Remastered, was released for Nintendo Switch, PlayStation 4, PlayStation 5, Xbox One, Xbox Series X/S, and Windows on January 17, 2025.

The game is set in the world of Ephinea and follows Asbel Lhant, who as a child befriends an amnesiac girl and witnesses her death before reuniting with her seven years later.

Tales of Graces and Tales of Graces f both received positive reception in Japan. The Wii version sold over 100,000 copies while the PS3 version sold 200,000 copies during their first week of release. The game was adapted into four manga collections, a novel series, and eight drama CDs. The English localization of Tales of Graces f received praise for the gameplay, with mixed reviews for its presentation.

== Gameplay ==
A battle gameplay in Tales of Graces f

Tales of Graces consists primarily of two major areas: the field map and a battle screen. The field map is a realistically scaled 3D environment traversed by foot, on which various skits between characters can be viewed that include animated character portraits, subtitles, and full voice acting. The battle screen is a 3D representation of an area, in which the player commands characters in battle against CPU-controlled enemies.

During battle sequences, the game uses the Style Shift Linear Motion Battle System. Four characters are chosen to battle, with characters not controlled by the player being controlled by artificial intelligence with instructions set by the player beforehand. Chain Capacity (CC) denotes the number of skills and actions a character can perform, with usage reducing it, and it recharges over time. During battle, the player and enemy have an Eleth Gauge, which, when filled, grants unlimited CC and resistance to stunning. Each character has two skill systems: Assault Artes, which are predetermined combos, and Burst Artes, which can be mapped to specific inputs. Skill and attribute development are dependent on Titles and their levels. Titles are earned through story progression and completion of miscellaneous criteria during battle, and each have five levels that are advanced by completing battles.

== Plot ==
The game takes place in the world of Ephinea, which is divided into the countries of Windor, Stratha, and Fendel. Each nation relies on energy known as "eleth", distributed throughout the world in the form of crystals known as "Cryas". The three "Valkines Cryas" are giant crystals which are the primary source of eleth for each nation.

Asbel Lhant, Hubert Lhant, and Cheria Barnes are children from Lhant, a village in Windor, who one day befriend an amnesiac girl from outside their village, whom they name Sophie. Richard, the prince of Windor, visits Lhant and befriends the group. After Asbel and Sophie save Richard from an assassination attempt, Richard returns to Barona, Windor's capital city, inviting them to come visit. Asbel and Sophie secretly head to Barona soon after. Upon reuniting with Hubert and Cheria, the group enters the castle through a secret passage at Richard's instruction. They discover an unconscious Richard and are attacked by a powerful monster, and Sophie sacrifices herself to save them. Asbel awakens in Lhant and learns of Sophie's death and Hubert's political adoption into the Oswell family, done to secure Asbel's future as the Lord of Lhant. Distraught over Sophie's death and the political events at home, Asbel runs away and enrolls in Barona's knight academy, training under Captain Malik Caesar.

Seven years later, Asbel encounters Cheria and learns that his father has died defending Lhant from Fendel's invasion. They return to Lhant and unexpectedly encounter a revived Sophie, who has lost her memories. Fendel resumes the attach on Lhant but are stopped by Hubert, who arrives with Stratha's military. He reveals that Windor ordered Stratha to secure Lhant, and assumes the position of Lord after banishing Asbel from the village. After hearing rumors of Richard's death, the party investigates and finds him in the castle's secret passage. Richard tells them that his father was killed by his uncle, Cedric, who has assumed the throne. The party travels to meet Richard's ally in a neighboring city and encounter Pascal, a prodigy from the ancient Amarcian tribe of engineers, who joins them. As they travel, Richard begins to show signs of madness and has several violent outbursts. With the allied army, the party overthrows Cedric and Richard regains the throne.

Richard orders an invasion of Lhant to free it from Stratha's control, forcing the party to betray him. Recognizing Hubert's efforts to protect Lhant, they travel to Stratha with Malik to negotiate with the government and formally instate Hubert as the Lord of Lhant. The Strathan government agrees on the pretense that Pascal repairs Stratha's valkines, which is malfunctioning. Though they succeed, Richard arrives absorbs the valkines' eleth before fleeing. The party learns that Windor's valkines has also been absorbed, and plan to intercept Richard at the final valkines in Fendel. Hubert joins the party and they travel to Fendel, but they fail to stop Richard. They deduce that the Lastalia, the planet's core, is Richard's final target. The party finds him there and attempts to reason with him, but he mortally wounds Sophie before sealing the entrance in a massive cocoon-like barrier.

The party is unable to heal Sophie with magic or medicine, so Pascal suggests that they travel to Fodra, a nearby planet that Sophie originates from, to find a cure. After finding a space shuttle left behind by Pascal's ancestors, they travel to Fodra and meet Emeraude, the last remaining human there. Using advanced machinery, Sophie is healed and regains her memories, revealing that she is a biological humanoid that does not age, engineered by the people of Fodra to defeat Lambda. They also discover that Lambda is the monster that attacked them seven years prior and is possessing Richard. Emeraude helps the party bypass the barrier on the Lastalia, where they confront and defeat Richard. Emeraude betrays the party and attempts to absorb Lambda's power in order to restore Fodra, but fails to assume control and is killed in the process. Lambda begins to fuse with the Lastalia, allowing the party to see his memories and learn of his suffering at the hands of humanity on Fodra. Within the core of the planet, the party defeats the materialized Lambda; since he cannot be killed by normal means, Sophie intends to sacrifice herself once again to kill him. Instead, Asbel absorbs Lambda into his body, and convinces Lambda to let him show humanity's worth. Seeing the strength of Asbel's resolve, Lambda reluctantly agrees, to before falling into a deep sleep.

In the after-story Lineage and Legacies, the monster population has become an epidemic, forcing the party to reunite and investigate the cause. Hypothesizing that the eleth from Fodra is influencing the monsters, they travel there and discover that Fodra's core has reactivated and is sentient, seeking revenge on humans for Fodra's environmental decay. The party defeats Fodra's soldiers, the "Little Queens", and have the reawakened Lambda absorb Fodra's consciousness before he returns to his deep sleep in order to dispel Fodra's hatred, as Asbel had done for him. The party separates and returns to their daily lives, with Asbel proposing to Cheria and the pair adopting Sophie as their daughter. In the distant future, Sophie shares the story of the party's adventures with Asbel and Cheria's great-great-grandson.

=== Main characters ===
Asbel Lhant (アスベル・ラント, Asuberu Ranto)

Asbel is the eldest son and successor to Aston Lhant, the Lord of the village Lhant. After Sophie's death and Hubert's adoption into the Oswell family, Asbel leaves for Barona, where he trains to become a knight in order to atone for his failure to protect Sophie. (Note: Asbel: "You know, it's because of you that I wanted to be strong in the first place." /Sophie?: "Me? [...]" /Asbel: "Sorry. I guess I think of you as Sophie, you know?") After the events of Tales of Graces, he assumes the position of Lord. In Lineage and Legacies, he marries Cheria and adopts Sophie into the Lhant family. Since his debut, Asbel has ranked third in the Tales character popularity polls.

The game's producer, Hideo Baba, wanted Asbel's story to portray the need to conform to social guidelines and expectations as one grows up. Through Asbel's conflict between choosing to succeed his father's Lordship or follow his dreams as a Knight, Baba wanted the players to understand the importance of protecting what is important to them and following through with their own path and dreams.

Sophie (ソフィ, Sofi)

Sophie is an amnesiac girl whom Asbel, Hubert, Cheria, and Richard befriend. She is seemingly killed after protecting them from Lambda, but reappears seven years later to protect Asbel and Cheria when they are in danger. She is later revealed to be Protos Heis, a humanoid made of tiny particles that can act together or separately. Her death was her breaking up into particles that came to reside inside Asbel, Hubert, and Cheria to heal their wounds, causing them to possess mystical powers. (Note: Emeraude: "Protos Heis is composed of individual particles that act in concert with each other. These particles, tinier than a grain of sand, come together to form a human shape. And while they act as one, the particles also possess the ability to separate from each other, which is what you see happening now. [...] It's the result of a process called "distriputive preservation". Your friends must be completely synchronized with Protos Heis' particles. [...] When Protos Heis suffers heavy damage, it usually splits into individual particles, shuts down all functionality, and begins the process of reconstruction. This is known as "particle preservation". Distributive preservation, on the other hand, allows Protos Heis to implant its particles into one or more separate vessels. [...]" Pascal: "Would her particles have any kind of effect on the vessels that they went into?" /Emeraude:"Yes. In fact, while the particles prepare for reconstruction, they would repair any damaged areas of the vessels as well." /Pascal: "So Sophie split herself into three parts and then used those parts to save Asbel, Cheria, and Little Bro! [...]" /Hubert: "I see. Then this would explain why we possess some of the same power she has.") During the events of Lineage and Legacies, Sophie expresses her fears of life after the death of her friends due to her immortality. (Note: Sophie: "I want to be human. [...] Asbel... Cheria... Hubert... Richard... Pascal... Captain Malik... You're all going to die someday...But not me. If I were a human you couldn't leave me alone when you die. Help me, Asbel. How do I become human? [...] No matter how sad I get, I can't even cry like you.") To lessen her fears, Asbel formally adopts her into the Lhant family. (Note: Asbel: "I've given this some thought, and if you want a family, I think we should give you one. From now on, your name shall be Sophie Lhant and I'll be your father.") After fusing with a Little Queen, Sophie ages to an adult and is able to express a greater variety of emotions. Since her debut, Sophie has ranked on the Tales character popularity polls. Sophie is a playable character in Tales of the World: Radiant Mythology 3.

Hubert Oswell (ヒューバート･オズウェル, Hyūbāto Ozuweru)

Hubert is Asbel's younger brother, who is adopted into the Oswell family to secure Asbel's succession to Lord. (Note: Aston: "Hubert is a bright and tenacious boy who can accomplish great things under Sir Oswell's tutelage. I want him to be proud of the man he will become. And above all else, I want him to avoid having to fight for my title. The very same fight that ruined my brother and I.") Hubert resents Asbel for deserting Lhant, perceiving the act as spiteful to his sacrifice, and his parents for abandoning him. (Note: Hubert: "I spent the last seven years studying and training. I've sacrificed everything to achieve what I've become. I'm not you. I didn't forget my home and my people so I could go gallivanting around the countryside.") (Note: Hubert: "Because of pride. You miss them at first but in time that pain turns to anger. Soon, you feel as if you can never forgive them. [...] You hate him. You want to get back at him. You want to ask why he did it. [...] But that only lasts as long as he's still around. Once he's gone, you'll finally understand how meaningless it all was.") He overcomes his anger when he reunites with his family seven years later. Due to his capabilities, he is appointed the lieutenant of the Strahta military. Hubert ranked on the fifth Tales character popularity poll and fell from the rankings afterwards. He makes a cameo in Tales of Hearts R dressed as the Sony mascot Kuro.

Cheria Barnes (シェリア･バーンズ, Sheria Bānzu)

Cheria is the granddaughter of Lhant's family butler, who was sickly as a child but is healed due to Sophie's powers. She is in love with Asbel, but treats him coldly after he leaves Lhant; however, she later reconciles with him after revealing her sorrow at him abandoning her. (Note: Asbel: "You know, you've been treating me like crap ever since I came back here." /Cheria: "Well that's your fault. In fact, all this is your fault! Seven years ago, you walked out of my life. You never came back, I don't know if I'd ever see you again.") She later marries him after he proposes to her. Since her debut, Cheria has ranked on the Tales character popularity polls. Game Informer listed Cheria as one of the best characters in the Tales series. Cheria is a playable character in Tales of the World: Radiant Mythology 3 and Tales of the Heroes: Twin Brave.

Richard (リチャード, Richādo)

Richard is the prince of Windor, who befriends Asbel and Sophie after his visit to Lhant. Before meeting Asbel, Richard is distrustful of others due to them exploiting his status for their own gain and his uncle Cedric's attempts to murder him. (Note: Richard: "You're only pretending to like me so you can use me later. It's always the same. People are only nice to me when they want something for themselves.") When Cedric poisoned him and left him to die in the underground passage, Lambda saved his life by fusing with him. Seven years later, Lambda's influence causes Richard to become violent and attempt to destroy humanity by fusing with the Lastalia. After separating from Lambda, Richard is determined to atone for his crimes, causing him to become more popular with the people of the three countries. (Note: Asbel: "I've been hearing your about your work from travelers. Everyone says you're doing a great job!" /Hubert: "In Stratha, King Richard is even more popular than even our president. You can even buy trading cards with his picture on them!" /Malik: "In Fendel, his popularity rivals that from the chancellor. I'm not sure who is more famous." /Richard: Please believe me: I don't lead these monster hunts out of some mad desire for fame. My earlier actions dealt a considerable amount of economic damage to both Fendel and Stratha. To make restitution for those deeds, Windor has taken on massive amounts of debt.) Since his debut, Richard has ranked on the Tales character popularity polls.

Malik Caesar (マリク・シザース, Mariku Shizāsu)

Malik is Asbel's instructor at the knight academy, who is popular with women due to his maturity and gentlemanly demeanor. In the past, he was a revolutionary of Fendel who fought for the lower class. After the events of the game, he becomes Fendel's ambassador. Malik ranked on the fifth Tales character popularity poll and fell from the rankings since then. He makes a cameo in .hack//Link's pre-order DVD.

Pascal (パスカル, Pasukaru)

Pascal is a prodigy of the Amarcians, a tribe of engineers, who is fascinated by mysterious technology and Sophie's origins. Since her debut, Pascal has ranked on the Tales character popularity polls. She makes a cameo in Tales of Hearts R dressed as Sony mascot Toro Inoue.

Lambda (ラムダ, Ramuda)

Lambda is an advanced lifeform created on Fodra, whose mistreatment by humans caused him to harbor hatred towards them. During the party's childhood, he resides inside Richard after he is injured by Sophie, saving his life. Seven years later, Lambda is reawakened when Richard is fatally wounded, healing him and manipulating him to achieve his goal of destroying humanity. After being defeated by the party, Lambda is absorbed by Asbel, who convinces him to give humans a chance. In Lineage and Legacies, he absorbs Fodra's consciousness to dissuade her hatred as Asbel did for him. (Note: Lambda: "I will start dreaming together with Fodra. In that dream, I hope that eventually we may form a kind of common understanding. Just as this man did for me.")

Fodra (フォドラ, Fodora)

Fodra is a sentient desolated planet. A thousand years ago, Fodra began annihilating humanity with its personal army, the Little Queen (Note: リトルクイーン, Ritoru Kuīn), to preserve its environment. (Note: Scientist 1: "So it's as if Fodra is trying to rid itself of a virus." /Scientist 2: "And in this scenario, the virus is..." /Scientist 1: "The Little Queen's target is none other than... humanity itself.") Fodra's scientists shut down Fodra's core and relocate the surviving humans to Ephinea. In Lineage and Legacies, Fodra is reactivated and resumes its genocide; after being confronted by the party, it merges the remaining Little Queens to form Fodra Queen (Note: フォドラクイーン, Fodora Kuīn). After the party defeats the Queen, Fodra's consciousness is absorbed by Lambda, who intends to dissuade its hatred. As the last Little Queen is dying, Sophie accepts her request to merge with it and watch over Fodra. (Note: Little Queen: "Will you... take what's... left of me... with you... please? Take my feelings.. and my hopes.. for this world.")

== Development and release ==
On July 7, 2008, Namco Bandai Games announced the next core product of the Tales series is developed for the Wii. A trailer for the game was shown in October 2008 during the Nintendo Autumn 2008 Conference. During Jump Festa 2009, the game was given the code name Tales of 10 (テイルズ オブ 10, Teiruzu Obu 10) and is revealed to have been in development for the past two years. In the first week of April's Weekly Shōnen Jump, the game's name was revealed to be Tales of Graces; the name was trademarked by Namco Bandai Games a month prior. That same week, the developers were revealed to the same developers from Tales of Destiny. In the same month, the game's theme was revealed to be Mamoru Tsuyosa wo Shiru RPG (守る強さを知るRPG, lit. "RPG to Know the Strength to Protect"). During the September Tokyo Game Show, the game's theme song was revealed to be Mamoritai (White Wishes) by BoA, which marks the second time a theme song in the Tales series has had both an English version and a Japanese version. The game was released on December 10, 2009, and was also available as a bundle with a new Wii system. The game included Kamenin Merchant! (かめにんマーチャント!, lit. "Turtle Merchant!"), a minigame for the Nintendo DS. Kamenin Merchant! was released for the Nintendo DSi on December 2, 2009. To promote the game, Namco Bandai Games and House Foods collaborated on packaged mabo curry. In March 2010, Namco Bandai Games began to recall Tales of Graces due to software bugs. Namco allowed customers to exchange their game with an updated version until July 2011.

American box art of Tales of Graces f

=== Tales of Graces f ===
The PlayStation 3 port, titled Tales of Graces f, was first revealed on July 28, 2010's Weekly Shōnen Jump and officially announced by Namco on August 2, 2010. The producer, Hideo Baba, explained the port was decided in February 2010 due to fan demand. The port adds an "Accelerate Mode" to the gameplay and an after-story entitled Lineage & Legacies. Preorderers received a DVD which contains a video of the game's protagonists meeting with characters from Tales of Destiny 2. A demo was released on October 7, 2010, and the game was released on December 2, 2010. A limited edition of the game included a letter set. Namco and House Foods restarted the packaged mabo curry to promote the game. Tales of Graces f was later re-released with a 15th anniversary cover art edition on August 4, 2011, and with PlayStation 3 The Best label on August 2, 2012.

A North American localization was hinted on Namco Bandai Games' Facebook page by a puzzle on January 24, 2011. When solved, the puzzle reveals a URL to a distorted image which was restored on February 2, 2011, and reveals Tales of Graces f's localization for North America. On May 11, 2011, Namco officially announced the North American, EMEA and Asia-Pacific localization of Tales of Graces f. The text was translated by 8-4 while Cup of Tea Productions produced the dubbing. The North American localization was released on March 13, 2012. The EMEA and Asia-Pacific localization released on August 31, 2012, along with a day one special edition. The game was made available on the North American and European PlayStation Network in March 2013.

A remastered version, Tales of Graces f Remastered, was released for Nintendo Switch, PlayStation 4, PlayStation 5, Xbox One, Xbox Series X, and Windows on January 17, 2025. It contains quality of life updates, all downloadable content, and new scenes available outside of Japan for the first time.

=== Downloadable content ===
Tales of Graces offers costumes for the playable characters as downloadable content. Pre-orderers received codes which give Asbel, Sophie, and Cheria costumes from Tales of Vesperia. Costumes based on The Idolmaster Dearly Stars for Sophie, Cheria, and Pascal were released on December 16, 2009. On December 23, 2009, a Hatsune Miku costume for Sophie and a suit set for Asbel, Hubert, and Malik were released. Between January and March 2010, a set of unique costumes designed by Mutsumi Inomata were released for each character. In addition to the costumes, challenge battles were also added as downloadable content.

Tales of Graces f received similar content as its Wii predecessor. Pre-orderers received a code which gives Asbel, Sophie, and Richard costumes from Tales of Destiny 2. On the release date, Code Geass costumes, a Toro costume for Pascal, and Sophie's Hatsune Miku costume were made available to download. On December 9, 2010, the Idolmaster set, suit set, school uniform set, and a Haseo costume for Asbel were released. The unique costumes designed by Inomata were released on December 22, 2010. In January 2011, various costumes were released to make the characters resemble other characters from the Tales series.

In North America, all Tales of Graces f's DLC, excluding cameo costumes from other franchises, was localized and released between March 13, 2012, and April 10, 2012. Europe received the same DLC which were released between August 29, 2012, and September 26, 2012. For the Tales of Destiny 2 preorder costumes, North American preorders from GameStop received a code for them; in Europe, the code was included with the day one special edition.

== Media adaptions ==
=== Manga ===
Tales of Graces spawned four manga adaptations after its release: Three anthology collections, and a traditional manga series. The first anthology collection, Tales of Graces Comic Anthology (Note: テイルズ オブ グレイセス コミックアンソロジー, Teiruzu Obu Gureisesu Komikku Ansorojī) consists of three volumes by Ichijinsha. The second anthology collection, Tales of Graces f Comic Anthology (Note: テイルズ オブ グレイセス エフ コミックアンソロジー, Teiruzu Obu Gureisesu Efu Komikku Ansorojī), consists of a single volume by Ichijinsha and was released on March 25, 2011. The third anthology collection is Tales of Graces f Sub Travels (Note: テイルズ オブ グレイセス エフ サブトラベルズ, Teiruzu Obu Gureisesu Efu Sabu Toraberuzu) was serialized in ASCII Media Works's Viva Tales of Magazine Volume 8, 2011 to Volume 10, 2012 issues. The individual chapters were then collected and released in a single volume on November 27, 2012, under the Dengeki Comics imprint. A traditional manga series titled Tales of Graces f is written and authored by Megumu Aya (Note: あやめぐむ, Aya Megumu). It began serialization in Viva Tales of Magazine beginning in its Volume 2, 2011 issue and is currently ongoing. ASCII Media Works collected the chapters and released the first volume on October 27, 2011.

=== Books ===
Tales of Graces spun off a novel series titled "Tales of Graces f: Chikai no Hana" (テイルズ オブ グレイセス エフ 誓いの花, lit. Tales of Graces f: Flower of Promise). The first volume is subtitled Jō (上, lit. Above) and the second Ka (下, lit. Below). They were released by Enterbrain in February and May 2011. Tales of Graces f Official Scenario Book (Note: テイルズ オブ グレイセス エフ 公式シナリオブック, Teiruzu Obu Gureisesu Efu Kōshiki Shinario Bukku) by Namco Bandai Games was released by Yamashita Books on June 4, 2012. It details the game's plot and fictional world. Tales of Graces has received six strategy guides in total: three for the Wii and three for the PS3. Shueisha, Namco Bandai Games, and Enterbrain were the publishers.

=== Audio CDs ===
Ten drama CDs, produced by Frontier Works, and an original soundtrack by Avex Group were created based on the game. Drama CD: Tales of Graces (Note: ドラマCD テイルズ オブ グレイセス, Dorama CD Teiruzu Obu Gureisesu) 1 to 4 are side stories that take place during the game's plot. They were released between May 26, 2010, and August 25, 2010. Anthology Drama CD: Tales of Graces f 2010 Winter (Note: アンソロジードラマCD テイルズ オブ グレイセス エフ 2010 Winter, Ansorojī Dorama CD Teiruzu Obu Gureisesu Efu 2010 Winter), Anthology Drama CD: Tales of Graces f 2011 Summer (Note: アンソロジードラマCD テイルズ オブ グレイセス エフ 2011 Summer, Ansorojī Dorama CD Teiruzu Obu Gureisesu Efu 2011 Summer), Anthology Drama CD: Tales of Graces f 2012 Winter (Note: アンソロジードラマCD テイルズ オブ グレイセス エフ 2012 Winter, Ansorojī Dorama CD Teiruzu Obu Gureisesu Efu 2012 Winter), Anthology Drama CD: Tales of Graces f 2012 Summer (Note: アンソロジードラマCD テイルズ オブ グレイセス エフ 2012 Summer, Ansorojī Dorama CD Teiruzu Obu Gureisesu Efu 2012 Summer), Anthology Drama CD: Tales of Graces f 2013 Winter (Note: アンソロジードラマCD テイルズ オブ グレイセス エフ 2013 Winter, Ansorojī Dorama CD Teiruzu Obu Gureisesu Efu 2013 Winter), and Anthology Drama CD: Tales of Graces f 2013 Summer (Note: アンソロジードラマCD テイルズ オブ グレイセス エフ 2013 Summer, Ansorojī Dorama CD Teiruzu Obu Gureisesu Efu 2013 Summer) are side stories after the events of the Tales of Graces. Tales of Graces Original Soundtrack (Note: テイルズ オブ グレイセス オリジナル・サウンドトラック, Teiruzu Obu Gureisesu Orijinaru Saundotorakku) was released on February 10, 2010, and contains four discs. It ranked 128th on Oricon's charts.

== Reception ==
Reception

Aggregate scores
Aggregator	Score
GameRankings	78.96%
Metacritic	77/100
OpenCritic	82% recommend(Remaster) (Note: Based on 87 reviews.)

Review scores
Publication	Score
Electronic Gaming Monthly	8/10
Eurogamer	8/10
Famitsu	36/40 (Wii) 37/40 (PS3)
Game Informer	7.75/10
GameSpot	7/10
GamesRadar+	8/10
GamesTM	6/10
GameTrailers	6.7/10
IGN	No Rating
Joystiq	4.5/5
Official U.S. PlayStation Magazine	7/10
Play	77%

Award
Publication	Award
Japan Game Awards	Future Division Award (Wii)

Tales of Graces sold 113,000 copies on its initial launch date, and sales reached 216,000 within its first year. The game was re-released under the Nintendo Selects label on March 24, 2011. Famitsu praised the depth of the gameplay but criticized the loading time. The game was listed on Famitsu's "Greatest Games of All-Time" in 2010. Tales of Graces f sold over 200,000 copies in Japan during its first week and reached over 300,000 a year later. Tales of Graces f was later re-released under PlayStation 3 The Best label on August 2, 2012. Famitsu repeated their praise of the gameplay and lauded the graphical upgrades. A survey by ASCII Media Works's Dengeki Online in 2011 revealed Tales of Graces is ranked seventh on games readers would want to be adapted into an anime.

For the English localization of Tales of Graces f, critics praised the gameplay while the presentation received mixed reviews. IGN described the battle system as "a beautiful ebb and flow to each confrontation" while GameSpot considered it to be the most technical and robust system of the Tales series. Electronic Gaming Monthly and Joystiq praised the depth with the latter calling it "an actual challenge instead of mindless button-pressing". Meanwhile, Game Informer considered the combat to be simple but fun. Critics have also commented on the game's alchemy system, with IGN calling it "an approachable pursuit" and Joystiq describing it as "unwieldy" due to the number of collectibles. IGN, Game Informer, GamesRadar, and GameTrailers all criticized the backtracking needed in the game. Game Informer, GameSpot, and GameTrailers commented on the small world, with GameTrailers panning the linear pathways and "invisible walls" which prevent exploration along with the "cut and paste" dungeons.

The plot, graphics, and audio have received mixed reviews. The plot and characters have been called cliché by Game Informer, GameSpot, and GamesRadar. Game Informer called the childhood prologue monotonous but commented on the improving story after the time skip. GameSpot agreed, calling the prologue the "weakest part of the story on its own" but "crucial point of reference" which adds depth and eventually breaks away from the cliché. GamesRadar shared the same opinion as GameSpot and praised Richard's transformation into a villain. As for the graphics, IGN considered them outdated while Joystiq described it as washed-out with jerky movements. For the audio, IGN, Game Informer, and GamesRadar, considered the music underwhelming and the voice acting acceptable. IGN describes the voice acting "works" but some parts suffer from weak script. Game Informer compared the voices to a well-produced anime and GamesRadar considered them fitting for the characters. Meanwhile, GameTrailers criticized the presentation completely, citing the plot as predictable, the characters unengaging, the lightings flat, animations stiff, lipsyncing off, forgettable music, and the voice acting as dry.

== Notes and references ==
Notes

Primary references

Namco Tales Studio (March 13, 2012). Tales of Graces f (PlayStation 3). Namco Bandai Games.
