= Vivid: Kissing You, Sparkling, Joyful Smile =

"Vivid"

Single by BoA
- Released: June 4, 2008
- Recorded: 2008
- Genre: J-pop
- Length: 23:57
- Label: Avex Trax
- Producer: Lee Soo Man

BoA singles chronology
"Be with You." (2007)	"Vivid" (2008)	"Eat You Up" (2008)

Alternative covers

"Vivid" is BoA's 26th Japanese single which is BoA's first double A-side single to include two PVs for the A-sides. In addition to the track "Kissing You", the single also includes the songs "Sparkling" and "Joyful Smile". The single was released on June 4, 2008. "Kissing You" and "Joyful Smile" are R&B songs while "Sparkling" is consumed as a breakbeat song. The single debuted at #3 with first-day sales of 7,936 copies, according to the Oricon.

"Kissing You" was used as the drama Shichinin no Onna Bengoshi's theme song.

== Track listing ==
=== CD ===
1. Kissing You - 4:01
2. Sparkling - 4:02
3. Joyful Smile - 4:06
4. Kissing You (Instrumental) - 3:56
5. Sparkling (Instrumental) - 3:54
6. Joyful Smile (Instrumental) - 3:58

=== DVD ===
1. Kissing You (Music Clip)
2. Sparkling (Music Clip)
3. BoA TV 2nd Season -Kissing You & Sparkling Music Clip Making-

== Charts ==
=== Oricon Sales Chart (Japan) ===
Release	Chart	Peak position	Sales total	Chart run
June 4, 2008	Oricon Daily Singles Chart	3		
June 4, 2008	Oricon Weekly Singles Chart	5	29,304	6 weeks
June 4, 2008	Oricon Monthly Singles Chart			
June 4, 2008	Oricon Yearly Singles Chart			
