= Outgrow =

- CD/DVD cover

Studio album by BoA
- Released: February 15, 2006
- Recorded: 2005–2006
- Genre: J-pop
- Length: 1:00:51
- Language: Japanese
- Label: Avex Trax

BoA chronology
Merry Christmas from BoA (2005)	Outgrow (2006)	Made in Twenty (20) (2007)

Alternative cover
- CD only cover

Singles from Outgrow
- 1. "Do the Motion" Released: March 30, 2005; 2. "Make a Secret" Released: August 31, 2005; 3. "Dakishimeru" Released: November 23, 2005; 4. "Everlasting" Released: January 18, 2006

Professional ratings
Review scores
Source	Rating
HMV	4.5/5 stars

Outgrow is the fourth Japanese studio album (ninth overall) by South Korean recording artist BoA. It was released through Avex Trax on February 15, 2006, and features the singles "Do the Motion", "Make a Secret", "Dakishimeru", and "Everlasting". The album also features the track "First Snow" from BoA's special digital single, "Merry Christmas from BoA". Several songs on the album were either written or composed by BoA herself.

== Background and release ==
Outgrow comes in two editions: a limited CD+DVD edition, and a regular (unlimited) CD-only edition. Both editions come with different covers (as shown on the table on the right), and the CD features 13 tracks, including a bonus track of "First Snow" alongside 5 new songs. The limited edition CD+DVD version includes a DVD with 5 video clips (4 of which are of all of the music videos from the featured singles and an additional special "behind the scenes" clip).

== Singles ==
Four singles were spawned from Outgrow. Released in March 2005, "Do the Motion" became her first single to reach number one on the Oricon Singles Chart. It received a gold certification from the Recording Industry Association of Japan (RIAJ) and sold over 169,000 copies, while its b-side track "Kimi no Tonari de" received a double platinum certification for exceeding 500,000 paid ringtone downloads. The second single, "Make a Secret" peaked at number five on the Oricon Singles Chart and sold over 54,000 copies.

"Dakishimeru" was released as the third single from Outgrow in November 2005, peaking at number nine on the Oricon chart with sales of over 58,000 copies. The album's fourth single, "Everlasting", was released in both Japan and South Korea in January 2006. It peaked at number four on the Oricon Singles Chart and sold over 74,000 copies in Japan.

== Track listing ==
Outgrow – Standard edition
No.	Title	Length
1.	"Silent Screamerz"	3:29
2.	"Do the Motion"	4:13
3.	"Kimi no Tonari de" (キミのとなりで)	5:08
4.	"Outgrow ~Ready Butterfly~"	3:20
5.	"Make a Secret"	4:47
6.	"Everlasting"	5:24
7.	"Long Time No See"	3:56
8.	"Cosmic Eyes"	3:39
9.	"Dakishimeru" (抱きしめる)	3:48
10.	"Love Is Just What You Can't See"	5:06
11.	"Stay My Gold"	5:30
12.	"Soundscape"	4:11
13.	"With U"	3:58
14.	"First Snow" (bonus track)	4:22
Total length:		60:51

Outgrow – DVD
No.	Title	Length
1.	"Do the Motion" (video clip)
2.	"Make a Secret" (video clip)
3.	"Dakishimeru" (抱きしめる; video clip)
4.	"Everlasting" (video clip)
5.	"Making of Music Videos + Bonus Video Clip"

== Charts ==
=== Weekly charts ===
Chart (2006)	Peak position
Japanese Albums (Oricon)	1
Taiwanese Albums (G-Music)	7
Taiwanese J-pop Albums (G-Music)	1

=== Year-end charts ===
Chart (2006)	Position
Japanese Albums (Oricon)	31

== Sales and certifications ==
Region	Certification	Certified units/sales
Japan (RIAJ)	2× Platinum	427,871
South Korea	—	22,564
