= Eat You Up (BoA song) =

2008 single by BoA

Single by BoA

from the album BoA
- Language: English
- Released: October 21, 2008
- Recorded: April 2008
- Genre: Electropop
- Length: 3:13
- Label: SM USA
- Songwriters: Remee; Thomas Troelsen
- Producer: Henrik Jonback

BoA singles chronology
| "Vivid: Kissing You, Sparkling, Joyful Smile" (2008) | "Eat You Up" (2008) | "Eien/Universe/Believe in Love" (2009) |

"Eat You Up" is a song recorded by South Korean recording artist BoA for her twelfth studio and debut English eponymous studio album (2009). It was released on October 16, 2008 in Japan as the lead single from the album. The song was written by Remee and Thomas Troelsen, while production was handled by Henrik Jonback. The song was BoA's first attempt into the Western market, particularly North America. Musically, the track was described as an electronic dance song with elements of R&B.

Upon its release, "Eat You Up" garnered positive reviews from music critics. Many critics commended the song's electronic and dance-infused composition, and praised the song's commercial appeals; they also felt it was a choice to release through Western markets, and felt BoA's English skills had improved. It was successful on the US Billboard Dance Club Songs chart, peaking at number eight and staying in the chart for 12 consecutive weeks.

Two music videos were created for the single; the first had BoA dancing in ballet recital with back-up dancers, whilst the second has her dancing in a utopian-inspired planet. BoA performed the single during several of her concerts, including her Nowness and Who's Back? concert tours. Since its release, the song has received several recognitions and has been listed on several best lists by Eastern and Western publications. "Eat You Up" is one of the first songs by a Korean artist to be produced and written by Western producers, and is recognized as a key factor to the Korean Wave movement.

== Background and composition ==
In January 2008, publications in South Korea reported that BoA was planning on her North American debut. However, the head of BoA's label SM Entertainment, Lee Soo Man, denied the claims, saying that BoA was continuing work in Asian markets. South Korean publications started to surface once again about her North American debut, after SM Entertainment announced their US subsidiary label. On September 2, 2008, SM Entertainment officially announced BoA's North American debut under their subsidiary label. Ten days later, a press conference was held at the Seoul Imperial Palace Hotel to further clarify her plans. During her press conference, SM Entertainment announced that a song entitled "Eat You Up" was chosen as her debut English single. "Eat You Up" was first released on Japanese radio stations Tokyo-FM and JFN 38 Station on October 16. It was originally set for release on October 14, 2008 in the US, but was then pushed back to October 21, 2008.

"Eat You Up" was written by Remee and Thomas Troelsen, while production was handled by Henrik Jonback. It was programmed and contained background vocals by Troelsen, while mixing was handled by Anders Hvenare. Musically, the track was described as an electronic dance song with elements of R&B and pop music. Victoria Goldenberg from Purple Sky Magazine noted the song's "combination of grimy rhythms and staccato singing with the most melodic development of any track on the album." The majority of the song's composition, including the use of synthesizers and keyboards, have been processed through a reverse filter. The use of drum machines was overlapped after the reverse filter was used on the demo version, and was mixed after its completion.

== Critical reception ==
"Eat You Up" received positive reviews from most music critics. Patrick Sullivan from AllMusic was positive in his review, labelling it a "catchily electro" song; Sullivan highlighted the song as an album stand out track, while David Hickey from the same publication selected the song as one of BoA's best career moments. Staff members from Idolator listed the song's parent album on their "13 Great Pop Albums That Were Overlooked and Underrated In Their Time" list. Reviewing the album, Bradley Stern highlighted the song as one of the best tracks and stated that the material "deserves so, so much more than the dust it was dealt." Victoria Goldenberg from Purple Sky Magazine selected the song as the album's best track. A staff member from CD Journal was positive in their review; They commended the commercial appeal for its North American release, and praised the mixture of R&B and electronic music musical elements.

A reviewer from Selective Hearing was positive in his review. They praised the production and BoA's English pronunciation, stating "The production as a whole has a bit of en edge to it which is a slight departure from the typical BoA song but it works... Her pronunciation is miles above the English in her older songs. Her vocals are as strong as ever and even when the vocal effects are laid on thick her voice doesn't get drowned in them. You can still hear her clearly." Overall, the reviewer felt it was a great debut track for the North American audience. Asian Junkie member Random J reviewed the song on his personal blog site, and his response was mixed. He felt the song was "boring" and "bog standard" upon its release. However, he stated, "But in comparison to the rest of the album, the song is actually rather decent and a highlight. A definite grower."

=== Accolades ===
"Eat You Up" was ranked at number six on Spin's "21 Greatest K-Pop Songs of All Time" list; they said, "Though "Eat You Up" didn't take upon arrival, it's hard to hear why a pop offering this muscular (it's got a chorus like a Clydesdale) couldn't put a dent on American charts right this second." The song was recognized by Michael Fuhr, who wrote the book Globalization and Popular Music in South Korea: Sounding Out K-Pop, as one of the first songs by a South Korean artist to be handled by Western and European artists. It was ranked at number 12 on Koreaboo's Introduction to K-Pop list. It was ranked at number six on BuzzFeed's 21 Greatest Korean Pop Songs Ever list. It was ranked at number two on Allkpop's seven greatest North American debuts.

== Commercial response ==
Because of its digital release, it was ineligible to chart on Japan's Oricon Singles Chart, making it BoA's first single to not chart there since her 2005 single "Girls on Top". Despite its online success throughout several digital retailers in North America, it has failed to chart on the US Billboard Hot 100 or the Bubbling Under Hot 100 Singles chart, or the Canadian Hot 100. The single charted on US Dance Club Songs chart; it debuted at number 42 and peaked at number 27 for the week ending December 27, 2008. It was present for seven weeks, before it reached its peak position of eight on the week end of February 7. It fell to number 15 the following week end of February 14. It slipped outside the top 20 on the week end of February 21, and spent its final week at number 22 on the week end of February 28. The song was present for 12 weeks on the chart. It remains her only top ten single on the Dance Club Songs chart, her only top ten in any US Billboard chart, and her longest charting single. As of May 2009, Nielsen Soundscan confirmed that "Eat You Up" has sold over 28,000 units in the United States.

== Music videos ==
Two music videos were filmed for the single; a North American version directed by American director Diane Martel, and an Asian video by Korean director Eun Taek Cha. Due to heavily speculation of its premiere, SM Entertainment revealed that they planned on using both music videos to promote the single under the titles Version A (North American video) and Version B (Asian video). They said they never intended to use the Version A for Asia and Version B for North America, as they only labelled the videos as Version A and B. The North American video premiered in Japan on Mega Hits on October 17, 2008. Both videos were choreographed by Misha Gabriel and Flii Stylz respectively. The background dancers for both music videos are Nick Bass, Kenny Wormald and Trent Dickens.

BoA in the Asian music video (pictured).

The North American video starts with BoA standing in front of a window in a high-rise building, showing close-ups of her. The verse starts with her and backup dancers dancing on a deserted planet, with inter cut scenes of her singing in the high-rise building. The second verse shows her singing to the male lead interest, with inter cut scenes of her singing the second verse in a snow globe setting. She sings the bridge while dancing on the planet with her dancers with closeup scenes of her as well as a clip of the sun rising. The final chorus shows BoA dancing by herself with a wall of graffiti behind her as well as the deserted planet during the daytime as it is becoming more violent with winds blowing about. The video ends with her name BoA being displayed as well as the title of the song "Eat You Up".

The Asian video starts with BoA turning on a radio which starts the song. BoA starts to sing the song whilst dancing in the hallway of a large house. At the start of the second verse, a girl is doing ballet dancing in front a group of judges. When the chorus starts again BoA and her dancers breaks down the door and proceeds to dance in front of the judges. Due to the intensity of their dancing, they make cracks in the floor and cause a picture to fall from where it once stood. During the bridge, BoA is dancing alone and then switches back and she is dancing by herself in the faces of the judges. During the second chorus, things start to explode such as a clock that was hanging from the wall, the male judge's glasses and books start to fall from a bookcase. As the chorus ends most of the remaining windows break, the chandelier falls and a fire starts, which turn on the sprinklers. The video ends with BoA and her dancers leaving, and the room is left in destruction.

Both music videos received positive reviews from critics. Jun Eun-Young, writing in his book The Korean Wave, commended BoA's sexual image and felt its American appeal made it quite "infamous". A staff member from Rap Up was positive, commending BoA's "impressive moves". Lorna Fitzsimmons and John A. Lent, writing in their book Asian Popular Culture in Transition, commended BoA's dance moves and found that the directors "collaboration with various US-based artists clearly shows SM Entertainment's attempt to recreate an Americanized-localized BoA in the hope of accommodating her US pop customers tastes more easily." It was ranked at number seven on Eat Your Kim Chi's Seven Best SM Entertainment music videos.

== Promotion and legacy ==
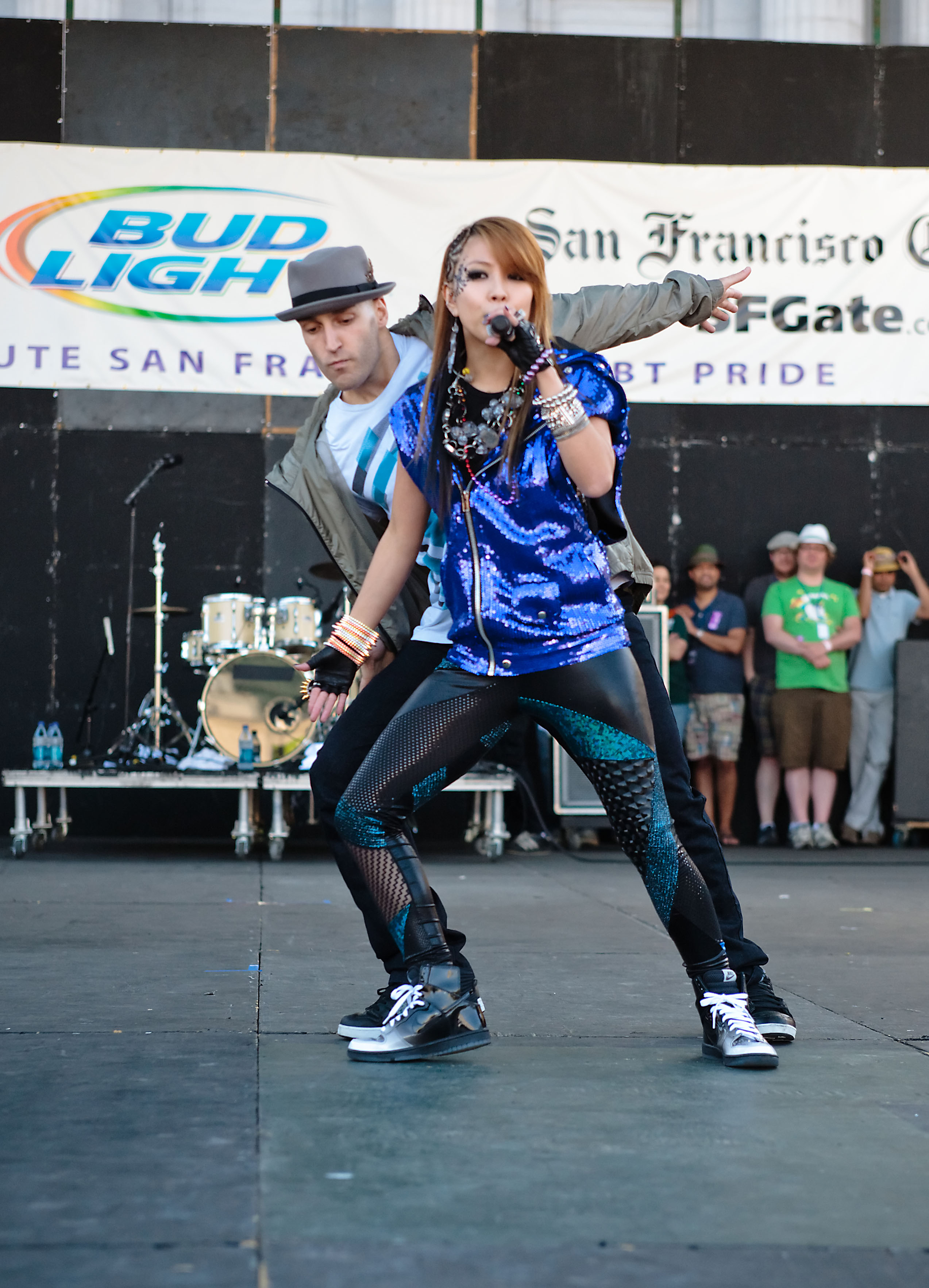
BoA performing the song at the San Francisco Pride Festival in 2009.

A remix of the single featured American rapper Flo Rida, which was slated for a November 2008 release. However, after the single was leaked online, the release was scrapped. BoA performed the song at YouTube's Tokyo Live concert, and performed in New York City on December 3, 2008, as well as the Jingle Ball at the Anaheim Honda Center on December 6, 2008. She headlined as a performer for the San Francisco Pride Festival on June 28, 2009 alongside Solange Knowles and The Cliks. She also performed the song, alongside "Energetic" and "I Did It for Love". from the self-titled studio album.

BoA performed the song on her Best & USA concert tour. It was later included on the live DVD for her studio album Identity (2010). The song was performed on BoA's Identity tour in Asia, where it was included during the first segment. It included on the live album, released on August 18, 2010. The song was performed on Here I Am tour in South Korea, where it was included during the first segment. It was included on the live DVD, released on July 2, 2015. The song was performed on BoA's Who's Back concert tour in Japan, where it was included during the first segment. It included on the live album, released on February 25, 2015. The song was performed on BoA's Nowness concert tour in Japan, where it was included during the first segment.

"Eat You Up" was included on BoA's double album Best & USA (2009). "Eat You Up", and BoA herself, have both been recognized by publications as a factor towards Korean Wave; a neologism that justifies an immigration of the culture of South Korea into Western market and society. But despite BoA's attempts to break into the Western market, particularly North America, such attempts did not succeed. Esther Oh, a freelance journalist writing for CNN, stated that BoA and another South Korean recording artist Se7en moved back to South Korea after their U.S. music careers struggled to gain traction. Oh labelled their attempts as "complete flops".

== Track listing ==
- CD single
1. "Eat You Up" (DJ Escape & Johnny Vicious Main Mix) – 7:27
2. "Eat You Up" (DJ Escape & Johnny Vicious Instrumental) – 7:29
3. "Eat You Up" (DJ Escape & Johnny Vicious Dub) – 6:39
4. "Eat You Up" (DJ Escape & Johnny Vicious Radio Edit) – 3:38
5. "Eat You Up" (King Britt Main Mix) – 6:21
6. "Eat You Up" (King Britt Radio Mix) – 3:04
7. "Eat You Up" (King Britt Instrumental) – 6:23
8. "Eat You Up" (King Britt BG Vocal Mix) – 6:20
- Digital download
1. "Eat You Up" – 3:12
- Digital music video
1. "Eat You Up" (South Korean video)

== Credits and personnel ==
Credits adapted from the liner notes of the promotional CD.

- BoA – vocals
- Remee – songwriting
- Thomas Troelsen – songwriting
- Henrik Jonback – producer
- Diane Martel – director (North American video)
- Eun Taek Cha – director (Asian video)
- SM Entertainment – BoA's record label
- SM Entertainment USA – BoA's record label

== Charts and sales ==
=== Charts ===
| Chart (2008–2009) | Peak position |
|---|---|
| US Dance Club Songs (Billboard) | 8 |

=== Sales ===
| Country | Sales |
|---|---|
| United States (Nielsen SoundScan) | 28,000 |
