= Identity (BoA album) =

2010 album by BoA

Studio album by BoA
- Released: February 10, 2010
- Recorded: 2009–2010
- Genre: Pop; dance-pop; R&B; electronic
- Length: 47:56
- Label: Avex Trax
- Producer: BoA

BoA chronology
Best & USA (2009)	Identity (2010)	Hurricane Venus (2010)

Singles from Identity
- 1. "Bump Bump!" Released: October 28, 2009; 2. "Mamoritai (White Wishes)" Released: December 9, 2009; 3. "Possibility (with Daichi Miura)" Released: February 19, 2010

Identity is the seventh Japanese studio album (thirteenth overall) by South Korean singer BoA. It was released on February 10, 2010, nearly two years since The Face. Commercially, the album underperformed in Japan in comparison to her previous albums, becoming her first to have not sold over 100,000 copies.

== Promotion ==
The album was preceded in release by the singles "Bump Bump!," a collaboration with Verbal from the hip-hop group M-Flo, and "Mamoritai (White Wishes)." The singles peaked at number five and number two on the Oricon charts, respectively. Also, there was an official music video for "Possibility". However, it was not released as a single.

== Commercial performance ==
Identity debuted at number two on the daily Oricon albums chart with 14,023 units sold in its first day and at number four on the weekly chart with 37,606 copies sold, making it her first Japanese album that did not chart to number one, ending her streak of studio albums debuting at number one on the Oricon weekly charts. Identity also became BoA's first studio album to not sell over 100,000 copies and to not receive certification.

== Track listing ==
Identity track listing
No.	Title	Lyrics	Music	Length
1.	"This Is Who I am"	BoA	BoA	2:52
2.	"Easy"	BoA	BoA	3:23
3.	"Bump Bump!" (featuring Verbal of M-Flo)	Verbal	Verbal, Agent Kozel, Minami	4:01
4.	"Lazer"	Verbal	Verbal, Suguru Yamamoto, Hisashi Nawata, Minami, Staxx T	4:07
5.	"Interlude #1"			0:09
6.	"Is This Love"	Daisuke Kawaguchi	Daisuke Kawaguchi	4:06
7.	"Mamoritai (White Wishes)" (まもりたい ~White Wishes~; I Want To Protect ~White Wishes~)	Mizue	Hiroo Yamaguchi	3:31
8.	"interlude #2"			0:04
9.	"Neko Love" (ネコラブ; Cat Love)	BoA	U-Key zone	3:34
10.	"The End Soshite and... (album ver.)" (The End そして and...)	BoA	BoA	7:10
11.	"Possibility" (duet with Daichi Miura)	Nao'ymt	Nao'ymt	4:07
12.	"Fallin'"	BoA	BoA	5:14
13.	"My All"	BoA	BoA	5:38
Total length:				47:56

DVD
No.	Title	Length
1.	"Bump Bump!" (Music Video)	4:17
2.	"Mamoritai (White Wishes)" (Music Video)	3:28
3.	"BoA Release Party 2009 Best & USA: Thank You for Your Support!" (Live at Studio Coast April 6, 2009)	50:57
Total length:		58:42

== Charts ==
=== Weekly charts ===
Chart (2010)	Peak position
Japanese Albums (Oricon)	4
Japanese Top Albums (Billboard Japan)	4
Taiwanese Combo Albums (G-Music)	6
Taiwanese J-pop Albums (G-Music)	2

=== Monthly charts ===
Chart (2010)	Peak position
Japanese Albums (Oricon)	7

== Sales ==
Region	Certification	Certified units/sales
Japan	—	72,408

== Release history ==
Country	Date	Format	Label
Japan	February 10, 2010	CD, CD+DVD, digital download	Avex Trax
Hong Kong	February 11, 2010	CD, CD+DVD	Avex Asia
South Korea	February 22, 2010	CD, digital download	SM Entertainment
Taiwan	February 26, 2010	CD, CD+DVD	Avex Asia
Philippines	April 16, 2010	CD	Universal Records
