= Lose Your Mind =

Single by BoA

from the album The Face
- Released: 12 December 2007
- Recorded: 2007
- Genre: J-pop
- Label: Avex Trax
- Songwriter(s): Simon Brenting, Shouko Fujibayashi, Jonas Jeberg, Greg Lawson, Damon Sharpe

BoA singles chronology
"Love Letter" (2007)	"Lose Your Mind" (2007)	"Be with You." (2008)

"Lose Your Mind" is BoA's 24th Japanese single. Alongside the title track is one B-side, "Smile Again". Lose Your Mind was released on December 12, 2007.

== Music video ==
The music video features BoA as a supermodel on the catwalk. She and two other female backup dancers start dancing on the catwalk and are joined by three male dancers. The music video also shows BoA in a short black wig. Yutaka Furukawa from Doping Panda also makes an appearance in the music video, playing the electric guitar. BoA's three outfits in the music video are a huge contrast to each other. She and her backup dancers are featured wearing black clothes. Later in the music video they are all wearing more casual clothes.

== Track listing ==
=== CD ===
1. Lose Your Mind (featuring Yutaka Furukawa from Doping Panda)
2. Smile Again
3. Lose Your Mind (featuring Yutaka Furukawa from Doping Panda) (Instrumental)
4. Smile Again (Instrumental)

=== DVD ===
1. Lose Your Mind (featuring Yutaka Furukawa from Doping Panda) (Music Clip)

== Live performances ==
- 2007.11.24 - Music Fair 21
- 2007.12.07 - Music Station
- 2007.12.15 - Music Japan
- 2007.12.16 - CDTV

== Charts ==
=== Oricon Sales Chart (Japan) ===
Release	Chart	Peak position	Sales total
12 December 2007	Oricon Daily Singles Chart	5	
12 December 2007	Oricon Weekly Singles Chart	6	28,128
