= Sweet Impact =

Single by BoA

from the album The Face
- Released: April 25, 2007
- Recorded: 2006
- Genre: J-pop, new jack swing
- Length: 16:42
- Label: Avex Trax

BoA singles chronology
"Winter Love" (2006)	"Sweet Impact" (2007)	"Love Letter" (2007)

"Sweet Impact" is BoA's 22nd Japanese single. It was released on April 25, 2007, and it hit #5 on the Oricon chart on its first day of release. The song "Sweet Impact" was first featured in Japan's FASIO commercial in January 2007. The video was inspired by Michael Jackson's Moonwalker. The single has approximately sold over 5,000 copies in Korea. It is also her first single to feature different cover art for both the CD-Only and CD+DVD versions.

== Track listings ==
=== CD ===
==== First Press Edition ====
1. Sweet Impact (5:02)
2. Bad Drive (3:31)
3. So Real (ArmySlick's Scratch Build Vocal) (4:39)
4. Sweet Impact (TV Mix) (5:02)
5. Bad Drive (TV Mix) (3:28)

==== Regular Edition ====
1. Sweet Impact (5:02)
2. Bad Drive (3:31)
3. Sweet Impact (TV Mix) (5:02)
4. Bad Drive (TV Mix) (3:28)

=== DVD ===
1. Sweet Impact (video clip) (5:06)

== Live performances ==
- 2007.04.02 - Hey! Hey! Hey! Music Champ
- 2007.04.27 - Music Station
- 2007.05.04 - Music Fighter

== Charts ==
=== Oricon Sales Chart (Japan) ===
Release	Chart	Peak position	Sales total
April 25, 2007	Oricon Daily Singles Chart	5	
April 25, 2007	Oricon Weekly Singles Chart	5	42,789
