= Make a Secret =

Single by BoA

from the album Outgrow
- Released: August 31, 2005
- Genre: J-pop; electropop
- Label: Avex Trax
- Songwriter(s): Masaki Asadi, Narimi Yamamoto

BoA singles chronology
"Do the Motion" (2005)	"Make a Secret" (2005)	"Dakishimeru" (2006)

"Make a Secret" is BoA's sixteenth Japanese single, and fifth lowest selling. The title track was used for a Kose Fasio commercial, and although the A-side track, "Make a Secret", was promoted, the B-side, "Long Time No See", won more acclaim and praise from fans. After the eyebrow-raising performance of her Do the Motion single, this single came as a huge disappointment to fans and staff alike.

== Overview ==
Released on August 31, 2005, this was BoA's fourth lowest selling single until Dakishimeru was released in November. This single got little to no promotion, and the commercial for KOSE Fasio was rarely shown on television. Also, coinciding with the release of Mika Nakashima's Nana single (a single featuring songs from the huge movie hit, Nana, and which would go on to sell over 420,000 copies) this single was doomed to failure and would go on to barely sell 48,000 copies in three weeks, and 54,000 copies overall.

== Commercial endorsements ==
The title track, make a secret, was used as the theme song for a Kose Fasio cosmetics commercial. The commercial was shot in a dance studio and features BoA and several other girls in white "school-girl" outfits dancing together. After several seconds of BoA and one girl dancing a "salsa" like dance (with the other girls chanting "ichi, ni, han! [one, two, three!]), BoA is shown applying the makeup from the multi-use applicator in three steps. The commercial was shown in both Korea and Japan (dubbed over in Korean for the Korean version) and featured two alternative versions: in the first the double applicator is an orange hue and BoA says, "eye tsumo two way" at the end, and in the second version the double applicator is a grey hue and she says, "lip tsumo two way".

== Music video ==
The promotional video for "make a secret" contained six scenes: BoA sitting/standing in a studio with large photo lights, first reading a newspaper, and then getting pictures taken. In another scene BoA is in a black room dancing with four male backup dancers, in the third scene BoA is dancing in a black room full of ropes, and in another scene BoA is singing in both a dark and light room (as shown in the screen cap). In another scene BoA is taking photographs/having photos of herself taken in another black room, and in the last scene BoA is in a red room having photographs of herself taken.

== Track listing ==
1. Make a Secret
2. Long Time No See
3. Make a Secret (Instrumental)
4. Long Time No See (Instrumental)

== TV performances ==
- August 24, 2005 - NTV「ミンナのテレビ (NTV Minna no Terebi Guest)
- August 30, 2005 - ANB「あしたまにあ～な」（PVオンエア） (PV on Air)
- September 2, 2005 - ANB「Music Station」
- September 3, 2005 - CX「Music Fair 21」
- September 4, 2005 - Music On! TV KISS×KISS
- September 9, 2005 - NHK POPJAM

== Charts ==
Release	Chart	Peak position	Sales total
August 31, 2005	Oricon Daily Singles Chart	4	
August 31, 2005	Oricon Weekly Singles Chart	5	54,453
August 31, 2005	Oricon Yearly Singles Chart	171	
