= I Did It for Love =

Single by BoA featuring Sean Garrett

from the album BoA
- Released: June 2, 2009
- Recorded: 2008
- Label: SM Entertainment; Arsenal
- Songwriters: Melvin Watson Jr.; Matthew Irby; Garrett Hamler
- Producers: The Phantom Boyz; Sean Garrett

BoA singles chronology
"Believe in Love" (2009)	"I Did It for Love" (2009)	"After Love: First Boyfriend/Girlfriend" (2009)

Sean Garrett singles chronology
"Lay Up Under Me" (2008)	"I Did It for Love" (2009)	"Break Up" (2009)

"I Did It for Love" is a song by South Korean singer BoA featuring American singer Sean Garrett. The song is her second single for her debut eponymous English album, BoA. The track was written and produced by Garrett, Melvin Watson Jr., and Matthew Irby. The single was released on June 2, 2009.

== Background ==
On February 17, 2009, SM Entertainment USA released a 1:30 clip of the song on Myspace, Facebook, YouTube, Imeem, and iLike. The song is about a woman who's been hurt by her lover and despite the fact that he leaves her, she continues to love him.

== Music video ==
The music video for "I Did It for Love" was filmed by Joseph Kahn in January 2009 at Ren-Mar Studios in Hollywood. It was released on April 15, 2009, on BoA's MySpace page. The music video incorporates themes of water, mysticism, and the color black, as well as BoA's use of a hand-held fan to produce an oriental feel to the video. Portions of the video were considered reminiscent of Janet Jackson in its choreography and outfits.

== Live performances ==
BoA performed the song as well as "Eat You Up" at the Universal CityWalk, on March 21, 2009. BoA also performed the song at the 2009 MTV Video Music Awards Japan along with Sean Garrett.

== Track listing ==
CD remix single

1. I Did It For Love (King Britt Main Mix Vox Up)
2. I Did It For Love (King Britt Main Mix)
3. I Did It For Love (King Britt Instrumental)
4. I Did It For Love (King Britt Radio Mix)
5. I Did It For Love (Radio Edit)
6. I Did It For Love (DJ Escape & Johnny Vicious Main Mix)
7. I Did It For Love (DJ Escape & Johnny Vicious Dub Mix)
8. I Did It For Love (DJ Escape & Johnny Vicious Instrumental)
9. I Did It For Love (DJ Escape & Johnny Vicious Acapella)
10. I Did It For Love (DJ Escape & Johnny Vicious Radio Mix)

== Commercial performance ==
"I Did It for Love" entered the Billboard Hot Dance Club Play at number 41 on the issue date of May 23, 2009. Since then the song has peaked at number 19.

== Charts and sales ==
=== Charts ===
Chart (2009)	Peak position
Taiwan J-pop Albums (G-Music)	19
US Dance Club Songs (Billboard)	19

=== Sales ===
Country	Sales
United States (Nielsen SoundScan)	4,000

== Credits and personnel ==
- Vocals: BoA, Sean Garrett
- Writers: Sean Garrett, Melvin K. Watson Jr. and Matthew I. Irby.
- Producer: Sean "The Pen" Garrett, The Phantom Boyz
