= Everlasting (BoA song) =

- Japanese single cover

Single by BoA

from the album Outgrow
- Language: Japanese; Korean
- B-side: "Soundscape"; "People Say..."
- Released: January 18, 2006
- Genre: Pop
- Length: 5:27
- Label: Avex Trax; SM
- Songwriters: BoA; Natsumi Watanabe
- Producer: Kazuhiro Hara

BoA singles chronology
"Dakishimeru" (2005)	"Everlasting" (2006)	"Nanairo no Ashita (Brand New Beat)/Your Color" (2006)

Music video
- "Everlasting" on YouTube

"Everlasting" is a song by South Korean recording artist BoA. It was released as her 18th Japanese single under Avex Trax on January 18, 2006, and her 4th physical Korean single under SM Entertainment a week later on January 25, 2006. The leading track "Everlasting" is a ballad, and the B-side track of the Japanese release, "Soundscape", is a mid-tempo song. "People Say..." serves as the B-side track for the South Korean release. The single also contains a "classical version" (orchestral composition remake) of "Everlasting".

== Commercial endorsements ==
"Everlasting" was used as the network advertisement for the online Japanese music giant, music.jp; it was also used as the ending theme for the TV Asahi drama The Door of Miracles: The Power of TV. In addition, "Everlasting" was used as the theme song for the Japanese dubbing of the movie Oliver Twist, directed by Roman Polanski.

== Music video ==
The first scene shown in the music video is of BoA in a dark room with a flower and many photographs scattered throughout the floor of the room. There are three windows to the room. Through each of windows, BoA is there, one with a big black hat with a white dress, another with a flower in her hair and the atmosphere like autumn and the last is BoA sitting upon a bell tower dressed in completely black. The music video takes turns between all the scenes and BoA is shown singing throughout all of them.

== Track listing ==
Japanese version

1. "Everlasting" – 5:27
2. "Soundscape" – 4:12
3. "Everlasting" (Classical version) – 5:27
4. "Everlasting" (TV Mix) – 5:29
5. "Soundscape" (TV Mix) – 4:15

Korean version

1. "Everlasting" – 5:24
2. "People Say..." (슬픔은 넘쳐도) – 4:23
3. "Everlasting" (Classical version) – 5:28
4. "Everlasting" (Instrumental) – 5:24
5. "People Say..." (슬픔은 넘쳐도) (Instrumental) – 4:21

== Credits and personnel ==
Credits adapted from the liner notes of "Soundscape".

Personnel – Japanese version

- BoA – vocals, lyricist (track 1)
- Natsumi Watanabe – lyricist (track 1)
- Kazuhiro Hara – composer, arranger (track 1)
- Narumi Yamamoto – lyricist (track 2)
- Dieter Bohlen – composer (track 2)
- Colin Campsie – composer (track 2)
- K-Muto – arranger (track 2)

== Charts ==
=== Weekly charts ===
Chart (2006)	Peak position
Japan Singles (Oricon)	3

=== Monthly charts ===
Chart (2006)	Peak position
Japan Singles (Oricon)	4
South Korean Albums (MIAK)	6

=== Year-end charts ===
Chart (2006)	Position
Japan Singles (Oricon)	128

== Sales and certifications ==
Region	Certification	Certified units/sales
Japan (RIAJ) Physical single	Gold	74,000
Japan (RIAJ) Chaku-uta	2× Platinum	500,000^{*}
South Korea Physical single	—	24,000
^{*} Sales figures based on certification alone.
