= Ravex =

Japanese electronic music group

- Origin: Tokyo, Japan
- Genres: Electronic, electropop, dance-pop, house, electro house, pop
- Years active: 2008–present
- Labels: Avex Group (Rhythm Zone)
- Members: Shinichi Osawa; Tomoyuki Tanaka; Taku Takahashi
- Website: http://www.ravex.jp

Ravex (stylized as ravex; a portmanteau of rave and Avex) is a Japanese electronic music group, consisting of Shinichi Osawa, Tomoyuki Tanaka and record producer DJ Taku Takahashi. Established to mark the 20th anniversary of the Avex label, their productions are usually based on collaborations with other artists on the label. Tezuka Productions are providing art, animation and the use of Osamu Tezuka characters to the project.

Their debut album, Trax, was released on April 29, 2009. The deluxe edition contains a DVD featuring the group's music videos as well as a new 18-minute short featuring Astro Boy and other Osamu Tezuka characters.

== Discography ==
=== Singles ===
- "I Rave U feat. DJ Ozma" – December 17, 2008
- "Believe in Love feat. BoA" – February 18, 2009

=== Albums ===
- Trax (2009)
