= Lynn & Wade LLP =

Lynn And Wade LLP
- Lynn & Wade LLP press photo

Background information
- Birth name: Peter Wade Keusch & Michelle Lynn Bell
- Also known as: LNW, L&W, L&W LLP
- Origin: New York City, United States
- Genres: Pop, R&B, electronic
- Years active: 2004–2009

Lynn & Wade LLP is a musical/production duo consisting of the producer Peter Wade Keusch and the singer-songwriter Michelle Bell.

As their production and writing careers advanced, they gave up work on their unfinished album The Mystery LLP and it is yet to be released.

Five songs written and produced by Lynn & Wade are used on the Jennifer Lopez album Brave ("Never Gonna Give Up", "The Way It Is", "Be Mine", "I Need Love" and "Frozen Moments"). h
