= Do the Motion =

Single by BoA

from the album Outgrow
- Released: March 30, 2005
- Recorded: 2005
- Genre: J-pop; electropop; dance-pop
- Label: Avex Trax
- Songwriter(s): Youko Kuzuya, Natsumi Watanabe

BoA singles chronology
"Meri Kuri" (2004)	"Do the Motion" (2005)	"Make a Secret" (2005)

"Do the Motion" is BoA's 15th Japanese CD single (and first of 2005), and third highest selling. This was also BoA's first number one single, and made her the first non-Japanese Asian singer to top the Oricon charts in over 21 years. This single scored commercial endorsements for every song on the single (excluding the TV Mixes) and is BoA's highest selling single of 2005. This was also the first single for her sixth Japanese album, Outgrow.

== Overview ==
Released on 30 March 2005 (a month after the release of her smash "Best of" compilation Best of Soul), "Do the Motion" would obtain the number one position on the day of its release and would go on to grab the number one position for the week with first week sales in excess of 66,000 copies, and did not fall out of the top 20 until the sixth week after its release. The leading track, Do the Motion, showcased a completely new style which had a "jazzy" feeling to it, although many Western fans were apprehensive about how well accepted this style shift would be, the Japanese public would embrace it along with the two B-side tracks: the ballad, Kimi no tonari de (キミのとなりで), and the mid-tempo track, With U, which was coined by BoA herself.

== Commercial endorsements ==
The title track Do the Motion was used for a KOSE Fasio commercial which showcased BoA dancing to the track in a white outfit in front of an orange background. In this commercial BoA had a jagged white outline placed around her as well. Kimi no tonari de (キミのとなりで) was used for an "au by KDDI EZ [New Arrival]" commercial in which a couple is walking around a zoo and the male download and plays a clip of the song onto his cellphone. With U was used in a Lipton Tea commercial (the beginning of BoA's endorsement by Lipton) and showed BoA drinking a new flavor of the iced tea on a grass covered hillside and then jumping and dancing in the field with the bottle.

== Music video ==
The promotional video for "Do the Motion" contains four scenes: In the first BoA is wandering around a European city taking in the sites in a cream trench coat before sitting on (and singing at) a bench. In the second scene, BoA is sitting on a bed (in a mansion) in a dress singing, in the third BoA is dancing with four female backup-dancers in a dress in a large ballroom (of the same mansion). In the last scene BoA is first entering and then dancing in the large ballroom of the mansion with a masked man in a pink ball gown.

== Track listing ==
1. Do the Motion
2. With U
3. Kimi no tonari de (キミのとなりで)
4. Do the Motion (TV Mix)
5. With U (TV Mix)
6. Kimi no tonari de (キミのとなりで) (TV Mix)

== Live performances ==
- 1 April 2005 - 情報ツウ
- 1 April 2005 - Music Fighter
- 7 April 2005 - えき☆スタ発
- 8 April 2005 - NHK Super Live Best Hit
- 8 April 2005 - Pop Jam
- 9 April 2005 - CDTV
- 14 April 2005 - Utaban
- 20 August 2005 -【Live】 A-Nation'05 【東京】(Tokyo)
- 27 August 2005 -【Live】 A-Nation'05 【神戸】(Kobe)
- 28 August 2005 -【Live】 A-Nation'05 【神戸】(Kobe)
- 30 November 2005 - 130 Million Choose Best Artist

== Charts ==
Release	Chart	Peak position	Sales total
March 30, 2005	Oricon Daily Singles Chart	1	
March 30, 2005	Oricon Weekly Singles Chart	1	169,542
March 30, 2005	Oricon Yearly Singles Chart	58	
