= The Face (album) =

- CD+DVD cover

Studio album by BoA
- Released: February 27, 2008
- Recorded: 2007–2008
- Studio: On Air Azabu Studios; ABS Recordings; Prime Sound Studio Form; Bunkamura Studio; Warner Music Recording Studio; ZeeQ Studio
- Genre: J-pop
- Length: 65:06
- Language: Japanese
- Label: Avex Trax

BoA chronology
| Made in Twenty (20) (2007) | The Face (2008) | BoA (2009) |

Alternative cover
- CD only cover

Singles from The Face
- 1. "Sweet Impact" Released: April 25, 2007; 2. "Love Letter" Released: September 26, 2007; 3. "Lose Your Mind" Released: December 12, 2007; 4. "Be with You" Released: February 20, 2008

The Face (stylized in all caps) is the sixth Japanese studio album (eleventh overall) by South Korean recording artist BoA. It was released through Avex Trax on February 27, 2008. The full album contains a total of fifteen tracks and was released in three versions; a regular CD, CD and DVD bundle, and a limited first press edition. Recorded in Japanese with minor phrases in English, The Face is a pop album containing influences from electropop. BoA assumed greater creative control over the record in comparison to her previous releases.

Commercially, The Face marked BoA's sixth consecutive number-one album on the Oricon Albums Chart in Japan, making her the solo artist with the second-most number-one albums in the country's history at the time, with the first being Ayumi Hamasaki with eight number-one albums. It sold over 185,000 copies in Japan according to Oricon, and was certified platinum by the Recording Industry Association of Japan (RIAJ).

Four singles were released from The Face. The first single, "Sweet Impact", peaked at number five on the Oricon Singles Chart and received two gold certifications from the RIAJ. The album's second single, "Love Letter", peaked at number three on the Oricon Singles Chart and was certified gold in downloads by the RIAJ. "Lose Your Mind" was released as the third single and peaked at number six, while the final single, "Be with You", was released a week prior to the album. BoA embarked on her The Face Live Tour in support of the record, which spanned 20 concerts across Japan.

== Background and composition ==
"For this album, I was more particular about selecting and arranging the songs, therefore I feel that I got closer to the type of music I was looking for."

— BoA commenting on assuming greater creative control on The Face.

The production of The Face started with her "Sweet Impact" single, released in Spring 2007. On January 15, 2008, it was announced that BoA would release her new album on February 27. In an interview with Oricon in February 2008, BoA commented that she decided to have more creative control on her new album by writing lyrics herself and was more particular about the selection and arrangement of the songs. In this way, she felt she had gotten closer to the music she wanted. For The Face, BoA's record label Avex Trax enlisted longtime creatives such as Natsumi Watanabe, H-Wonder and Kazuhiro Hara, as well as foreign producers like Daniel Pandher, Tommy La Verdi and Jonas Jeberg to work on its material. The Face was recorded at various studios throughout Japan during 2007 and 2008, and was mastered by Chris Gehringer at Sterling Sound in New York City.

The album opener "Aggressive" is a disco-influenced track. "Sweet Impact" is an upbeat SWV-style R&B track. "My Way, Your Way" is an urban track that features the rapper Wise. "Be With You." is a power ballad that lyrically depicts the happiness that blossoms in a moment when two people walk together along a row of cherry blossom trees. "Lose Your Mind" is a dance track with electric guitars. "Girl In the Mirror" is a southern hip-hop track. "Happy Birthday" is a bubblegum pop track that speaks of an ex-boyfriend who she wished she could spend her birthday with.

"Diamond Heart" is a house track singing about the psychology of a woman who wants to "shine forever." "Love Letter" is a pure love ballad about the importance of conveying honest feelings. "Brave" features a darker sound with its synth and slower paced beats. "Gyappu ni Yarareta!" is an upbeat pop track. "Style" is a pop track with various synthesizers. "Smile Again" is a slow ballad. "Beautiful Flowers" is an uplifting song with the message of "Let's work hard for ourselves." "Best Friend" is about a young fan of BoA’s.

== Singles ==
Three months after the release of her fifth studio album, Made in Twenty (20). "Sweet Impact" was first featured in a Fasico CM in January 2007. "Sweet Impact" also features a B-side "Bad Drive" and it sold 42,789 in Japan and 5,000 in South Korea.

Approximately five months later, she released another single, entitled "Love Letter". It became her second single to be featured on her sixth studio album. The release of "Love Letter" contained the B-sides "Diamond Heart" and "Beautiful Flowers." "Beautiful Flowers" was chosen by the Yokohama BayStars (a baseball team in Japan's Central League), as the team's official theme song during their 2007 season. "Diamond Heart" was used to promote Toshiba's W53T camera, which featured BoA herself.

Three months after the release of "Love Letter", BoA once again released another single entitled: "Lose Your Mind", which was released on December 12, 2007. It hit its peak position at number six and sold total of 22,961 copies as of December 26, 2007. Shortly afterwards, BoA announced another single, "Be with You", which was planned to be released along with her sixth Japanese studio album. But due to competition on February 20, 2008, with other major artists, the album was pushed backwards a week to February 27, 2008, to avoid conflicts.

== Reception ==
Professional ratings
Review scores
| Source | Rating |
|---|---|
| Allmusic | 2.5/5 stars |

In a review of the album, Adam Greenberg from AllMusic wrote, "BoA put together a safe set. The sounds are well within the realm of contemporary J-pop, and the vocal demands never become too great. The songs here are nice, they're largely sugary little ballads making full use of a sweet and slightly warbling vocal, and they tend to show off components of a lot of American R&B circa 1996 or so."

== Music videos ==
Four music videos (or PVs) were released in support of the album: "Sweet Impact", "Love Letter", "Lose Your Mind" (featuring Yutaka Furukawa from Doping Panda), and "Be with You." The "Sweet Impact" PV was inspired by Michael Jackson's Moonwalker, wheareas the "Love Letter" PV officially aired on early September before the single's release.

The PV for "Lose Your Mind" features BoA as a supermodel on the catwalk. She and two other female backup dancers start dancing on the catwalk and are joined by three male dancers. The music video also shows BoA in a short black wig. Yutaka Furukawa from rock group Doping Panda also makes an appearance in the music video playing the electric guitar. BoA's three outfits in the music video are a huge contrast to each other. She and her backup dancers are featured wearing black clothes. Later in the music video they are all wearing more casual Japanese style clothes.

"Be with You" was featured in the Japanese film, 10 Promises to My Dog. The PV shows scenes of BoA in a canoe, on a couch, and spending time with a Golden Retriever. Also expressing how much she remembers being with you or in her case her lover. Also that she wants to live the promises that she made with him and to forget all the troubles so long as they are together.

== Track listing ==
The Face – Standard edition
| No. | Title | Lyrics | Music | Arrangement | Length |
|---|---|---|---|---|---|
| 1. | "Aggressive" | Natsumi Watanabe | Daniel Pandher; Tommy La Verdi | H-Wonder | 3:41 |
| 2. | "Sweet Impact" | Ryoji Sonoda | Kazuhiro Hara | Kazuhiro Hara | 4:58 |
| 3. | "My Way, Your Way" (featuring Wise) | Ryoji Sonoda; Wise | Daisuke Imai | Daisuke Imai | 4:21 |
| 4. | "Be with You." | Satomi | H-Wonder | H-Wonder | 5:12 |
| 5. | "Lose Your Mind" (featuring Yutaka Furukawa from Doping Panda) | Shoko Fujibayashi | Jonas Jeberg; Simon Brenting; Damon Sharpe; Greg Lawson | H-Wonder | 3:13 |
| 6. | "Girl in the Mirror" | Shoko Fujibayashi | BoA; Akira | Akira | 3:08 |
| 7. | "Happy Birthday" | Chokkyu Murano | Tomomi Narimoto | Naoki-T | 4:09 |
| 8. | "Diamond Heart" | Emi Nishida | ArmySlick | ArmySlick | 4:10 |
| 9. | "Love Letter" | BoA; Natsumi Watanabe | Yoko Kuzuya | Yanagiman | 5:04 |
| 10. | "Brave" | Emi K. Lynn | Sun Suyama | Shoichiro Hirata | 3:57 |
| 11. | "Gyappu ni Yarareta! (Hit by the Gap!)" (ギャップにやられた!) | BoA | Akira | Akira | 3:40 |
| 12. | "Style" | HUB | Nao Tanaka | Nao Tanaka | 3:09 |
| 13. | "Smile Again" | BoA | Nao Tanaka | Nao Tanaka | 5:39 |
| 14. | "Beautiful Flowers" | Shoko Fujibayashi | H-Wonder | H-Wonder | 3:30 |
| 15. | "Best Friend" | Hiro | Hiro | Hiro | 4:08 |
| Total length: | | | | | 61:59 |

The Face – Limited edition (bonus track)
| No. | Title | Lyrics | Music | Arrangement | Length |
|---|---|---|---|---|---|
| 16. | "Hey Boy, Hey Girl" (Seamo featuring BoA) | Naoki Takada | Naoki Takada; Shintaro "Growth" Izutsu | Naoki Takada; Shintaro Izutsu | 3:47 |
| Total length: | | | | | 3:47 |

The Face DVD – Disc 1
| No. | Title | Length |
|---|---|---|
| 1. | "Sweet Impact" (music video) |
| 2. | "Love Letter" (music video) |
| 3. | "Lose Your Mind" (music video) |
| 4. | "Be with You." (music video) |
| 5. | "BoA TV -The Face of BoA- Be with You." (Limited edition only) |
| 6. | "Special Live Performance – 65 minutes worth of clips" (Limited edition only) |

The Face DVD – Disc 2 (BoA '07 Live Works)
| No. | Title | Length |
|---|---|---|
| 1. | "BoA the Live "X'mas" – (8 performances)" |
| 2. | "BoA Arena Tour 2007 Made in Twenty (20) (4 performances)" |
| 3. | "M-Flo Tour 2007 Cosmicolor @ Yokohama Arena-the Love Bug Performance" |
| 4. | "Be with You." (music video) |
| 5. | "Rhythm Nation 2007 (3 performances)" |

== Charts ==
=== Weekly charts ===
| Chart (2008) | Peak position |
|---|---|
| Japanese Albums (Oricon) | 1 |
| Japanese Top Albums (Billboard) | 1 |
| Taiwanese Albums (G-Music) | 2 |
| Taiwanese J-pop Albums (G-Music) | 1 |

=== Monthly charts ===
| Chart (2008) | Peak position |
|---|---|
| South Korean Int'l Albums (RIAK) | 3 |

=== Year-end charts ===
| Chart (2008) | Position |
|---|---|
| Japanese Albums (Oricon) | 59 |
| Japanese Top Albums (Billboard) | 57 |

== Sales and certifications ==
| Region | Certification | Certified units/sales |
|---|---|---|
| Japan (RIAJ) | Platinum | 185,388 |
| South Korea | — | 11,145 |

== Release history ==
| Region | Date | Format | Label |
|---|---|---|---|
| Japan | February 27, 2008 | CD; digital download | Avex Trax |
| Japan | February 27, 2008 | CD & DVD | Avex Trax |
| South Korea | February 27, 2008 | CD; digital download | Avex Inc.; SM Entertainment |
