= SM Entertainment discography =

Recording catalog

SM Entertainment is a South Korean entertainment company established in 1995 by Lee Soo-man. It is currently one of the largest entertainment companies in South Korea. The company operates as a record label, talent agency, music production company, event management and concert production company, and music publishing house.

The label is currently home to prominent K-pop artists such as Kangta, BoA, TVXQ, Super Junior, Girls' Generation, J-Min, Shinee, Zhou Mi, Exo, Red Velvet, NCT, Aespa, Riize and Hearts2Hearts. Some of the artists formerly under contract with them are H.O.T., Fly to the Sky, Shinhwa, TRAX, Zhang Liyin, S.E.S., The Grace, f(x), and Henry Lau.

In Japan, SM Entertainment co-publishes Avex Trax releases for artists including Ayumi Hamasaki, Namie Amuro, and Koda Kumi, as well as Johnny's Entertainment artists such as Arashi and KAT-TUN.

== 1990s ==
Released	Title	Artist	Type	Format	Language
April 1, 1990	New Dance 1	Hyun Jin-young & Wawoowa!	Studio album	LP, cassette, digital download, streaming	Korean
August 1, 1992	New Dance 2	Hyun Jin-young	Studio album	LP, CD, cassette, digital download, streaming	Korean
August 18, 1993	Blues in Rhythm	Yoo Young-jin	Studio album	LP	Korean
September 1, 1993	Int. World Beat and Hip-Hop of New Dance 3	Hyun Jin-young	Studio album	LP, CD, cassette, digital download, streaming	Korean
December 1993	Tin Tin Five	Tin Tin Five	Studio album	LP, CD, cassette, digital download, streaming	Korean
March 1, 1994	Easy Rock Single 1	Major	EP	CD	Korean, English
August 15 (or July), 1994	Guitar and Dance Single 1	J&J (Jay N' Jay)	EP	CD, cassette	Korean, English
September 1, 1995	Blue Rhythm	Yoo Young-jin	Studio album	CD	Korean
September 7, 1996	We Hate All Kinds of Violence	H.O.T.	Studio album	CD, cassette, digital download	Korean
July 11, 1997	Wolf and Sheep	H.O.T.	Studio album	CD, cassette, digital download	Korean
November 1, 1997	I'm Your Girl	S.E.S.	Studio album	CD, cassette, digital download	Korean
April 19, 1998	Resolver	Shinhwa	Studio album	CD	Korean
September 24, 1998	Resurrection	H.O.T.	Studio album	CD, cassette, digital download	Korean
November 27, 1998	Sea & Eugene & Shoo	S.E.S.	Studio album	CD, cassette, digital download	Korean
April 5, 1999	T.O.P	Shinhwa	Studio album	CD	Korean
September 15, 1999	I Yah!	H.O.T.	Studio album	CD, cassette, digital download	Korean
October 29, 1999	Love	S.E.S.	Studio album	CD, cassette, digital download	Korean
December 14, 1999	Day by Day	Fly to the Sky	Studio album	CD, cassette	Korean
December 1, 1999	Christmas in SMTown	SM Town	Studio album	CD, digital download, streaming	Korean

== 2000s ==
=== 2000 ===
Released	Title	Artist	Type	Format	Language
January 6	99 Live in Seoul	H.O.T.	Live album	CD, cassette, digital download	Korean
April	We Begin Again	Tin Tin Five	Studio album	CD, cassette, digital download, streaming	Korean
May 27	Only One	Shinhwa	Studio album	CD	Korean
August 25	ID; Peace B	BoA	Studio album	CD, digital download	Korean
September 29	Outside Castle	H.O.T.	Studio album	CD, cassette, digital download	Korean
December 8	Winter Vacation in SMTown.com	SM Town	Studio album	CD, digital download, streaming	Korean
December 22	A Letter from Greenland	S.E.S.	Studio album	CD, cassette, digital download	Korean

=== 2001 ===
Released	Title	Artist	Type	Format	Language
February 1	The Promise	Fly to the Sky	Studio album	CD, cassette	Korean
March 3	Jumping into the World (EP)	BoA	Special album	CD, digital download	Korean
May 4	Forever 2001 Live Concert	H.O.T.	Live album	CD	Korean
June 18	The First Story	Jang Na-ra	Studio album	CD, cassette	Korean
June 28	Hey, Come On!	Shinhwa	Studio album	CD	Korean
July 11	Surprise	S.E.S.	Compilation album	CD, cassette, digital download	Korean
August 19	Polaris	Kangta	Studio album	CD, digital download	Korean
September 10	Dana	Dana	Studio album	CD, digital download	Korean
October 5	Alone	Moon Hee-jun	Studio album	CD, cassette	Korean
November 9	Agape	Yoo Young-jin	Studio album	CD	Korean
December 4	Winter Vacation in SMTown.com – Angel Eyes	SM Town	Studio album	CD, digital download, streaming	Korean
December 17	With Freshness	M.I.L.K	Studio album	CD, cassette	Korean

=== 2002 ===
Released	Title	Artist	Type	Format	Language
January 31	My Choice	Shinhwa	Compilation album	CD	Korean
February 14	Choose My Life-U	S.E.S.	Studio album	CD, cassette, digital download	Korean
March 13	Listen to My Heart	BoA	Studio album	CD, digital download	Japanese
March 29	Perfect Man	Shinhwa	Studio album	CD, cassette	Korean
April	15 to 30	Shinvi	Studio album	CD	Korean
April 14	No. 1	BoA	Studio album	CD, digital download	Korean
April 26	Sea of Love	Fly to the Sky	Studio album	CD, cassette	Korean
July 18	Messiah	Moon Hee-jun	Studio album	CD, cassette	Korean
June 10	Summer Vacation in SMTown.com	SM Town	Studio album	CD, digital download, streaming	Korean
August 7	Peace B. Remixes	BoA	Remix album	CD, digital download	Korean
September 3	Tell Me Baby	Isak N Jiyeon	Studio album	—N/a	Korean
August 21	Pine Tree	Kangta	Studio album	CD, digital download	Korean
August 29	Vol. 1 Don't Go Away	Chu Ga Yeol	Studio album	—N/a	Korean
September 24	Miracle	BoA	Special album	CD, digital download	Korean
October 2	Sweet Dream	Jang Na-ra	Studio album	CD, cassette	Korean
November 3	Black Beat #2002 - The First Performance #001	Black Beat	Studio album	—N/a	Korean
November 21	Friend	S.E.S.	Compilation album	CD, cassette, digital download	Korean
December 27	Wedding	Shinhwa	Studio album	CD, cassette	Korean
December 6	2002 Winter Vacation in SMTown.com	SM Town	Studio album	CD, digital download, streaming	Korean

=== 2003 ===
Released	Title	Artist	Type	Format	Language
January 29	Valenti	BoA	Studio album	CD, CD/DVD, digital download	Japanese
May 30	Atlantis Princess	BoA	Studio album	CD, digital download	Korean
March 28	1st Concert Pinetree: 20020824 Live	Kangta	Live album	CD, digital download	Korean
June 18	2003 Summer Vacation in SMTown.com	SM Town	Studio album	CD, digital download, streaming	Korean
July 7	Missing You	Fly to the Sky	Studio album	CD, cassette	Korean
August 27	Next World	BoA	Remix album	CD, digital download	Korean
July 28	Legend	Moon Hee-jun	Studio album	CD, digital download	Korean
September 24	Fr. In. Cl.	S	Studio album	—N/a	Korean
October 1	남겨둔 이야기 (Maybe)	Dana	Studio album	CD, digital download	Korean
October 7	The Everlasting Mythology: Shinhwa 2nd Concert	Shinhwa	Live album	CD	Korean
December 4	Shine We Are!	BoA	Extended play	CD, digital download	Korean
December 8	2003 Winter Vacation in SMTown.com	SM Town	Studio album	CD, digital download, streaming	Korean

=== 2004 ===
Released	Title	Artist	Type	Format	Language
January 15	Love & Honesty	BoA	Studio album	CD, CD/DVD, digital download	Japanese
March 3	Kpop Selection	BoA	Compilation album	CD, CD/DVD, digital download	Japanese
June 11	My Name	BoA	Studio album	CD, CD/DVD, digital download	Korean
July 2	2004 Summer Vacation In SMTown.com	SM Town	Studio album	CD, digital download, streaming	Korean
July 24	"Paradox"	The TRAX	Digital single	CD, digital download, streaming	Korean
July 27	Vol 1.5 Aemo	Chu Ga Yeol	Studio album	—N/a	Korean
October 11	Tri-Angle	TVXQ	Studio album	CD, CD/DVD, digital download	Korean
November 8	Gravity	Fly to the Sky	Studio album	CD, CD/DVD, digital download	Korean
December 6	The Christmas Gift from TVXQ	TVXQ	Extended play	CD, CD/DVD, digital download	Korean
December 14	"Scorpio"	The TRAX	Digital single	CD, digital download, streaming	Korean, Japanese

=== 2005 ===
Released	Title	Artist	Type	Format	Language
February 2	Best of Soul	BoA	Compilation album	CD, CD/DVD, digital download	Japanese
April 15	Too Good	The Grace	Digital single	Digital download	Korean
March 4	Persona	Kangta	Studio album	CD, digital download	Korean
June 25	Girls on Top	BoA	Studio album	CD, DVD, digital download	Korean
October 3	Kangta & Best	Kangta	Compilation album	CD, digital download	Korean
September 12	Rising Sun	TVXQ	Studio album	CD, digital download	Korean
December 5	SuperJunior05 (Twins)	Super Junior 05	Studio album	CD, digital download	Korean
December 7	Gong Fu	Jang Na-ra	Studio album	CD, digital download	Chinese

=== 2006 ===
Released	Title	Artist	Type	Format	Language
January 25	Boomerang	The Grace	Single	Digital download	Japanese
February 15	Outgrow	BoA	Studio album	CD, DVD, digital download	Japanese
March 8	The Club	The Grace	Single	Digital download	Korean, Japanese
April 26	Sweet Flower	The Grace	Single	Digital download	Japanese
March 22	Heart, Mind and Soul	TVXQ	Studio album	CD, digital download	Japanese
May 19	Scandal	Kangta & Vanness	Extended play	CD, digital download	Korean, Mandarin, English
June 7	U	Super Junior	Single	CD, digital download	Korean
June 20	2006 Summer SMTown	SM Town	Studio album	CD, digital download, streaming	Korean
July 12	juicy LOVE	The Grace	Single	Digital download	Japanese
July 18	First Rain	TRAX	Studio album	CD, digital download	Korean
September 8	Timeless	Zhang Liyin	Single	CD, digital download	Korean
September 29	"O"-Jung.Ban.Hap.	TVXQ	Studio Album	CD, digital download	Korean
November 3	My Everything	The Grace	Single	Digital download	Korean
November 3	The One I Love	Super Junior-K.R.Y.	Single	Digital download	Korean
December 12	2006 Winter SMTown - Snow Dream	SM Town	Studio Album	CD, digital download, streaming	Korean

=== 2007 ===
Released	Title	Artist	Type	Format	Language
January 17	Made in Twenty (20)	BoA	Studio album	CD, DVD, digital download	Japanese
February 2	Vol. 2 There's So Much I Want To Say	Chu Ga Yeol	Studio album	—N/a	Korean
February 22	She	Jang Na-ra	Single	Digital download	Korean
February 23	Rokkugo	Super Junior-T	Single	CD, digital download	Korean
March 14	Five in the Black	TVXQ	Studio album	CD, digital download	Japanese
May 4	One More Time, OK?	The Grace	Studio album	CD, digital download	Korean
August 1	Piranha	The Grace	Single	Digital download	Japanese
September 12	Korogaru Ringo	J-Min	Extended play	CD, digital download	Korean
September 20	Don't Don	Super Junior	Studio Album	CD, digital download	Korean
October 24	TVXQ Nonstop-Mix Vol. 1	TVXQ	Remix album	CD	Korean, Japanese
November 1	Girls' Generation	Girls’ Generation	Studio Album	CD, digital download	Korean
November 14	Graceful 4	The Grace	Studio Album	CD, digital download	Japanese
December 7	2007 Winter SMTown - Only Love	SM Town	Studio Album	CD, digital download, streaming	Korean

=== 2008 ===
Released	Title	Artist	Type	Format	Language
January 16	Dream On…	J-Min	Extended play	CD, digital download	Japanese
January 22	T	TVXQ	Studio album	CD, digital download	Japanese
March 20	Sweet Memories with Girls' Generation	Girls’ Generation	Compilation album	CD	Korean
February 27	The Face	BoA	Studio album	CD, DVD, digital download	Korean
March 10	Heaven Tears	Chu Ga Yeol	Single	Digital download	Korean
March 12	I Will	Zhang Liyin	Studio album	CD, digital download	Chinese, Korean
March 12	Eternity	Kangta	Extended play	CD, digital download	Korean
March 13	Baby Baby	Girls’ Generation	Repackage album	CD, DVD, digital download	Korean
March 17	Heart 2 Heart with Girls' Generation	Girls’ Generation	Compilation album	CD	English
April 23	Me	Super Junior-M	Studio album	CD, digital download	Chinese
March 27	Dream of Asia	Jang Na-ra	Studio album	CD, digital download	Korean
May 19	Super Show Tour Concert Album	Super Junior	Live album	CD, digital download	Korean
May 22	Replay (EP)	Shinee	Extended play	CD, digital download	Korean
July 23	Stand Up People	The Grace	Single	Digital download	Japanese
June 5	Cooking? Cooking!	Super Junior-H	Extended play	CD, digital download	Korean
August 28	The Shinee World	Shinee	Studio album	CD, digital download	Korean
September 26	Mirotic	TVXQ	Studio album	CD, digital download	Korean
October 22	Here	The Grace	Single	Digital download	Japanese
October 29	A.MI.GO	Shinee	Repackage album	CD, digital download	Korean
November 19	The Singer	J-Min	Japanese	CD, digital download	

=== 2009 ===
Released	Title	Artist	Type	Format	Language
January 7	Gee	Girls’ Generation	Extended play	CD, digital download	Korean
January 9	Dear...	The Grace	Studio album	CD, digital download	Japanese
March 12	Sorry, Sorry	Super Junior	Studio album	CD, digital download	Korean
March 17	BoA	BoA	Studio album	CD, digital download	English
March 18	Best & USA	BoA	Studio album	CD, digital download	Japanese, English
March 25	The Secret Code	TVXQ	Studio album	CD, digital download	Japanese
March 26	Vol. 3 There Are Different Ways to Happiness	Chu Ga Yeol	Studio album	—N/a	Korean
May 12	It’s You	Super Junior	Repackage album	CD, DVD, digital download	Korean
May 15	The First Memories	The Blue	Extended play	CD, digital download	Korean
May 25	Romeo (EP)	Shinee	Extended play	CD, digital download	Korean
May 27	Change/One	J-Min	Single	Digital download	Japanese
June 29	Tell Me Your Wish (Genie)	Girls’ Generation	Extended play	CD, digital download	Korean
August 14	2009 Summer SMTown - We Are Shining	SM Town	Single	CD, digital download, streaming	Korean
September 1	LA chA TA	f(x)	Single	CD, digital download	Korean
September 23	Super Girl	Super Junior-M	Extended play	CD, digital download	Mandarin
October 19	2009, Year of Us	Shinee	Extended play	CD, digital download	Korean
October 29	"Moving On"	Zhang Liyin	Single	Digital download	Chinese
November 4	Chu~	f(x)	Single	CD, digital download	Korean
December 10	Super Show 2 Tour Concert Album	Super Junior	Live album	CD, digital download	Korean

== 2010s ==
=== 2010 ===
Released	Title	Artist	Type	Format	Language
January 25	가슴이 차가운 남자	TRAX	EP (Mini Album)	CD, Download	Korean
January 28	Oh!	Girls' Generation	Studio Album	CD, Download	Korean
February 10	Identity	BoA	Studio Album	CD, Download	Japanese
February 17	Best Selection 2010	TVXQ	Compilation Album	CD + DVD	Japanese
March 22	Run Devil Run	Girls' Generation	Studio Album	CD, Download	Korean
May 4	Nu ABO	f(x)	EP (Mini Album)	CD, Download	Korean
May 13	Bonamana	Super Junior	Studio Album	CD, Download	Korean
July 19	Lucifer	SHINee	Studio Album	CD, Download	Korean
July 21	Woo Weekend	BoA	Single	CD Single, CD + DVD, Download	Japanese
August 5	Hurricane Venus	BoA	Studio Album	CD, Download	Korean
September 6	Oh! My Goddess	TRAX	EP (Mini Album)	CD, Download	Korean
September 24	Copy & Paste	BoA	Studio Album	CD, Download	Korean
September 30	Hello	SHINee	Studio Album	CD, Download	Korean
October 27	Hoot	Girls' Generation	EP (Mini Album)	CD, Download	Korean
November 29	Miss You (SM the Ballad Vol. 1)	SM the Ballad	Single	Download	Korean
December 30	Into the New World	Girls' Generation	Live Album	CD, Download	Korean

=== 2011 ===
Released	Title	Artist	Type	Format	Language
January 5	Keep Your Head Down	TVXQ	Studio Album	CD, Download	Korean
February 25	Perfection	Super Junior-M	EP (Mini Album)	CD, Download	Mandarin
March 14	Keep Your Head Down (Repackage)	TVXQ	Studio Album	CD, Download	Korean
April 20	Pinocchio	f(x)	Studio Album	CD, Download	Korean
April 29	Perfection (Repackage)	Super Junior-M	Studio Album	CD, Download	Mandarin
June 1	Girls' Generation	Girls' Generation	Studio Album	CD, Download	Japanese
June 14	Hot Summer (Repackage)	f(x)	Studio Album	CD, Download	Korean
June 22	Close Ur Mouth	M&D	Single	Download	Korean
July 11	One More Chance	Dana & Sunday	Single	Download	Korean
August 2	Mr. Simple	Super Junior	Studio Album	CD, Download	Korean
September 19	A-Cha (Repackage)	Super Junior	Studio Album	CD, Download	Korean
October 19	The Boys	Girls' Generation	Studio Album	CD, Download	Korean
October 24	Super Show 3 - Super Junioe The 3rd Asia Tour Concert Album	Super Junior	Live Album	CD + DVD	Korean
November 10	Blind	TRAX	EP (Mini Album)	CD, Download	Korean
December 7	Milestone	BoA	Single	CD Single, CD + DVD, Download	Japanese
December 8	Mr. Taxi (The Boys version B)	Girls' Generation	Studio Album	CD, Download	Korean
December 13	2011 SMTOWN Winter: The Warmest Gift	SMTOWN	Studio Album	CD, Download	English
December 16	Oppa, Oppa	Super Junior Donghae & Eunhyuk	Single	Download	Korean
December 21	The Boys (English version)	Girls' Generation	Single	Download	English
December 28	The Boys (Japanese version)	Girls' Generation	Studio Album	CD, Download	Japanese

=== 2012 ===
Released	Title	Artist	Type	Format	Language
January 30	What Is Love	Exo	Single	Download	Korean, Mandarin
March 9	History	Exo	Single	Download	Korean, Mandarin
March 13	Still	TVXQ	Single	CD Single, CD + DVD, Download	Japanese
March 18	One Dream	BoA	Single	Download	Korean
March 21	Sherlock	SHINee	EP (Mini Album)	CD, Download	Korean
April	Oppa, Oppa (Japanese release)	Super Junior-D&E	Single	CD Single, CD + DVD, Download	Japanese
April 9	Mama	EXO	EP (Mini Album)	CD, Download	Korean, Mandarin
April 29	Twinkle	Girls' Generation-TTS	EP (Mini Album)	CD, Download	Korean
May 9	Opera	Super Junior	Single	CD Single, CD + DVD, Download	Japanese
May 16	Sherlock	SHINee	Single	Download	Japanese
June 10	Electric Shock	f(x)	EP (Mini Album)	CD, Download	Korean
June 27	Paparazzi	Girls' Generation	Single	CD Single, CD + DVD, Download	Japanese
July 4	Sexy, Free & Single	Super Junior	Studio Album	CD, Download	Korean
July 11	Android	TVXQ	Single	CD Single, CD + DVD, Download	Japanese
July 22	Only One	BoA	Studio Album	CD, Download	Korean
August 4	Hot Summer	f(x)	Single	Download	Japanese
August 8	Spy (Sexy, Free & Single Repackage)	Super Junior	Studio Album	CD, Download	Korean
August 10	SM Best Album 3	SMTOWN	Compilation Album	CD	Korean
August 22	Sexy, Free & Single	Super Junior	Single	Download	Japanese
September 26	Catch Me	TVXQ	Studio Album	CD, Download	Korean
September 26	Oh!	Girls' Generation	Single	CD, Download	Japanese
October 10	Dazzling Girl	SHINee	Single	CD + DVD, Download	Japanese
October 24	Vol. 5 Be Renewed	Chu Gayeol	Studio Album	CD, Download	Korean
October 31	PYL Younique Volume 1	Various Artists (BoA, Jessica, Younique Unit	Single Album	Download	Korean
November 21	Flower Power	Girls' Generation	Single	CD, Download	Japanese
November 21	If You Want	J-Min	Single	Download	Japanese
November 26	Humanoids (Catch Me Repackage)	TVXQ	Studio Album	CD, Download	Korean
November 28	Girls & Peace	Girls' Generation	Studio Album	CD Single, CD + DVD, Download	Japanese
December 12	1000nen, Zutto Soba ni Ite...	SHINee	Single	CD Single, CD + DVD, Download	Japanese
December 21	Dancing Queen	Girls' Generation	Single	Download	Korean
December 30	Spectrum	S.M. The Performance	Single	Download	Korean

=== 2013 ===
Released	Title	Artist	Type	Format	Language
January 1	I Got a Boy	Girls' Generation	Studio Album	CD, Download	Korean
January 7	Break Down	Super Junior-M	Studio Album	CD, Download	Mandarin, Korean
January 16	Catch Me: If You Wanna	TVXQ	Single	CD Single, CD + DVD, Download	Japanese
January 23	Promise You	Super Junior-K.R.Y.	Single	CD Single, CD + DVD, Download	Japanese
January 28	Disturbance	BoA	Single	Download	Korean
February 19	Chapter 1. Dream Girl – The Misconceptions of You	SHINee	Studio Album	CD, Download	Korean
February 27	Only One	BoA	Single	CD Single, CD + DVD, USB, Download	Japanese
March 3	Time	TVXQ	Studio Album	CD + DVD, Download	Japanese
March 13	Fire	SHINee	Single	CD + DVD, Download	Japanese
March 13	Heart Theater	J-Min	Single	CD, Download	Japanese
March 20	Best Selection Non Stop Mix	Girls' Generation	Remix Album	CD, Download	Japanese
March 27	10 CC X SM: Seoul Melody	Various Artist	Compilation Album	Download	Korean
April 11	2011 Girls' Generation Tour	Girls' Generation	Live Album	CD, Download	Korean
April 26	Why So Serious? – The Misconceptions of Me	SHINee	Studio Album	CD, Download	Korean
June 3	XOXO (Kiss & Hug)	EXO	Studio Album	CD, Download	Korean, Mandarin
June 7	Trap	Henry	EP (Mini Album)	CD, Download	Korean
June 12	Ocean	TVXQ	Single	CD Single, CD + DVD, Download	Japanese
June 19	Love & Girls	Girls' Generation	Single	CD Single, CD + DVD, Download	Japanese
June 19	I Wanna Dance	Super Junior-D&E	Single	CD Single, CD + DVD, Download	Japanese
June 26	Tail of Hope	BoA	Single	CD, Download	Japanese
June 26	Boys Meet U	SHINee	Studio Album	CD, Download	Japanese
June 28	Super Show 4 - Super Junior World Tour Concert Album	Super Junior	Live Album	CD	Korean
July 24	Hero	Super Junior	Studio Album	CD Single, CD + DVD, Download	Japanese
July 29	Pink Tape	f(x)	Studio Album	CD, Download	Korean
August 5	Growl (XOXO Repackage)	EXO	Studio Album	CD, Download	Korean, Mandarin
August 8	The Misconceptions of Us	SHINee	Compilation Album	CD, Download	Korean
August 21	Boys Meet U	SHINee	Single	CD Single, CD + DVD, Download	Japanese
August 23	1-4-3 (I Love You)	Henry	Single	Download	Korean, English
September 4	Scream	TVXQ	Single	CD Single, CD + DVD, Download	Japanese
September 18	Galaxy Supernova	Girls' Generation	Single	CD + DVD, Download	Japanese
October 14	Everybody	SHINee	EP (Mini Album)	CD, Download	Korean
October 23	Message/Call Me Name	BoA	Single	CD Single, CD + DVD, USB, Download	Japanese
October 23	Winter Ballad Collection 2013	BoA	Compilation Album	Download	Japanese
November 5	My Oh My	Girls Generation	Single	Download	Japanese
November 27	Very Merry Xmas	TVXQ	Single	CD + DVD, Download	Japanese
December 4	3 2 1	SHINee	Single	CD + DVD, Download	Japanese
December 9	Miracles in December	EXO	EP (Mini Album)	CD, Download	Korean, Mandarin
December 10	Love & Peace	Girls' Generation	Studio Album	CD Single, CD + DVD, Download	Japanese
December 11	Blue World	Super Junior	Single	CD Single, CD + DVD, Download	Japanese
December 18	Still You	Super Junior-D&E	Single	Download	Korean

=== 2014 ===
Released	Title	Artist	Type	Format	Language
January 6	Tense	TVXQ	Studio Album	CD, Download	Korean
January 21	Cross the Border	J-Min	Studio Album	CD, Download	Japanese
February 5	Something/Hide & Seek	TVXQ	Single	CD Single, CD + DVD	Japanese
February 13	SM the Ballad Vol. 2 – Breathe	SM the Ballad	EP (Mini Album)	CD, Download	Korean, Mandarin, Japanese
February 24	Mr.Mr.	Girls' Generation	EP (Mini Album)	CD, Download	Korean
February 26	Ride Me	Super Junior-D&E	Studio Album	CD, Download	Japanese
February 27	Spellbound (Tense Repackaged)	TVXQ	Studio Album	CD, Download	Korean
March 5	Tree	TVXQ	Studio Album	CD, Download	Japanese
March 5	Shout It Out	BoA	Single	CD Single, CD + DVD, USB, Download	Japanese
March 10	To Heart	Toheart	EP (Mini Album)	CD, Download	Korean
March 21	Swing	Super Junior-M	EP (Mini Album)	CD, Download	Mandarin
April 2	The 2nd Concert Album "Shinee World II"	SHINee	Live Album	CD, Download	Korean
May 7	Overdose	EXO	EP (Mini Album)	CD, Download	Korean, Mandarin
May 22	TVXQ! The 4th World Tour "Catch Me in Seoul"	TVXQ	Live Album	CD Single, DVD	Korean
June 11	Sweat / Answer	TVXQ	Single	CD Single, CD + DVD, Download	Japanese
June 23	Hoo	J-Min	Single	Download	Korean
June 25	Lucky Star	SHINee	Single	CD Single, CD + DVD Download	Japanese
July 7	Red Light	f(x)	Studio Album	CD, Download	Korean
July 14	Fantastic	Henry	EP (Mini Album)	CD, Download	Korean
July 18	Shine	J-Min	EP (Mini Album)	CD, Download	Korean
July 23	Masayume Chasing	BoA	Single	CD Single, CD + DVD, Download	Japanese
July 23	The Best	Girls' Generation	Greatest Hits Album	CD Single, CD + DVD, Download	Japanese
August 2	Agape	Zhang Liyin	Single	Download	Mandarin
August 4	Happiness	Red Velvet	Single	Download	Korean
August 6	Skeleton	Super Junior-D&E	Single	CD Single, CD + DVD, Download	Japanese
August 18	Ace	Taemin	EP (Mini Album)	CD, Download	Korean
September 1	Mamacita	Super Junior	Studio Album	CD, Download	Korean
September 3	Who's Back?	BoA	Studio Album	CD Single, DVD	Japanese
September 12	11 (ELEVEN)	Hitchhiker	Single	Download	Korean
September 16	Holler	Girls Generation-TTS	EP (Mini Album)	CD, Download	Korean
September 22	Not Alone	Zhang Liyin	Single	Download	Mandarin
September 24	I'm Your Boy	SHINee	Studio Album	CD Single, CD + DVD, Download	Japanese
September 29	Electric Dream	BeatBurger	EP (Mini Album)	CD, Download	Korean
October 8	Fantastic	Henry	Single	CD Single, DVD	Japanese
October 13	Be Natural	Red Velvet	Single	Download	Korean
October 15	The Best (New Edition)	Girls' Generation	Greatest Hits Album	CD Single, CD + DVD, Download	Japanese
October 27	This Is Love (Mamacita Repackaged)	Super Junior	Studio Album	CD, Download	Korean
October 27	Autumn Breeze	S	EP (Mini Album)	CD, Download	Korean
November 3	Rewind	Zhou Mi	EP (Mini Album)	CD, Download	Korean, Mandarin
November 5	Time Work Wonders	TVXQ	Single	CD Single, CD + DVD, Download	Japanese
November 13	At Gwanghwamun	Kyuhyun	EP (Mini Album)	CD, Download	Korean
November 26	At Gwanghwamun	Kyuhyun	Single	Download	Mandarin
December 3	Fly	BoA	Single	CD Single, CD + DVD, Download	Japanese
December 11	The 3rd Concert Album "Shinee World III"	SHINee	Live Album	CD, Download	Korean
December 17	Mamacita (Ayaya)	Super Junior	Single	CD Single, CD + DVD, Download	Japanese
December 17	With	TVXQ	Studio Album	CD Single, CD + DVD, Download	Japanese
December 19	December, 2014 (The Winter's Tale)	EXO	Single	Download	Korean
December 22	Exology Chapter 1: The Lost Planet	EXO	Live Album	CD, Download	Korean

=== 2015 ===
Released	Title	Artist	Type	Format	Language
January 12	Base	Jonghyun	EP (Mini Album)	CD, Download	Korean
February 16	Beautiful	Amber	EP (Mini Album)	CD, Download	Korean
February 25	Sakuramichi (Cherry Blossom Road)	TVXQ	Single	CD Single, CD + DVD, Download	Japanese
March 9	The Beat Goes On	Super Junior-D&E	EP (Mini Album)	CD, Download	Korean
March 11	Your Number	SHINee	Single	CD Single, CD + DVD, Download	Japanese
March 18	Ice Cream Cake	Red Velvet	EP (Mini Album)	CD, Download	Korean
March 24	The Beat Goes On (Repackaged Edition)	Super Junior-D&E	EP (Mini Album)	CD, Download	Korean
March 30	EXODUS	EXO	Studio Album	CD, Download	Korean
April 1	Present	Super Junior-D&E	EP (Mini Album)	CD Single, CD + DVD, Download	Japanese
April 10	Catch Me If You Can	Girls' Generation	Single	Download	Korean
April 16	Cottage Industry	M&D	EP (Mini Album)	CD, Download	Korean
April 22	Catch Me If You Can	Girls' Generation	Single	CD Single, CD + DVD, Download	Japanese
May 12	Kiss My Lips	BoA	Studio Album	CD, Download	Korean
May 18	Odd	SHINee	Studio Album	CD, Download	Korean
June 3	Love Me Right (Repackaged Edition)	EXO	Repackage Album	CD, Download	Korean
July 7	Party	Girls' Generation	Single	CD, Download	Korean
July 8	U Know Y	Yunho	EP (Mini Album)	CD Single, CD + DVD, Download	Japanese
July 16	Devil	Super Junior	Studio Album	CD, Download	Korean
July 20	Rise as God	TVXQ	Studio Album	CD, Download	Korean
July 22	Summer Special: Pinocchio / Hot Summer	f(x)	Single	CD Single, CD + DVD, Download	Japanese
August 3	Married To The Music (Repackaged Edition)	SHINee	Repackage Album	CD, Download	Korean
August 5	Join Hands	Super Junior-K.R.Y.	Single	CD Single, CD + DVD, Download	Japanese
August 19	Lion Heart	Girls' Generation	Studio Album	CD, Download	Korean
September 9	The Red	Red Velvet	Studio Album	CD, Download	Korean
September 16	Magic (Devil Repackaged Edition)	Super Junior	Repackage Album	CD, Download	Korean
September 17	The Collection: Story Op.1	Jonghyun	Compilation Album	CD, Download	Korean
September 30	Let's Get It On	Super Junior-D&E	Single	CD Single, CD + DVD, Download	Japanese
October 7	I	Taeyeon	EP (Mini Album)	CD, Download	Korean
October 15	Fall, Once Again	Kyuhyun	EP (Mini Album)	CD, Download	Korean
October 27	Sing Your Song	SHINee	Single	CD Single, CD + DVD, Download	Japanese
October 27	4 Walls	f(x)	Studio Album	CD, Download	Korean
November 3	The Day We Felt Distance	Kyuhyun	Single	Digital Single	Korean
November 4	Love Me Right	EXO	Single	CD Single, CD + DVD, Download	Japanese
November 6	Super Show 5 - Super Junior World Tour Concert Album	Super Junior	Live Album	CD, Download	Korean
November 6	Super Show 6 - Super Junior World Tour Concert Album	Super Junior	Live Album	CD, Download	Korean
November 18	Close to You	Changmin	EP (Mini Album)	CD Single, CD + DVD, Download	Japanese
December 4	Dear Santa	Girls' Generation-TTS	EP (Mini Album)	CD, Download	Korean
December 10	Sing for You	EXO	EP (Mini Album)	CD, Download	Korean
December 15	Wish List	f(x)	Single	Download	Korean
December 16	Lookbook	BoA	Single	CD Single, CD + DVD, Download	Japanese
December 18	Wish Tree	Red Velvet	Single	Download	Korean
December 22	Christmas Paradise	BoA	Single	Download	Korean

=== 2016 ===
Released	Title	Artist	Type	Format	Language
January 1	D×D×D	Shinee	Studio album	CD, download	Japanese
January 6	Devil / Magic	Super Junior	Single	CD single, CD + DVD, download	Japanese
January 22	Make Me Complete	BoA	Single	Download	Japanese
January 28	The Little Prince	Ryeowook	Extended play	CD, download	Korean
February 2	Rain	Taeyeon	Single	Download	Korean
February 19	Tell Me (What Is Love)	Yoo Young-jin & D.O.	Single	Download	Korean
February 23	Press It	Taemin	Studio album	CD, download	Korean
February 26	Because of You	Kenzie, Yoon Mi-rae & Matthew Tisher	Single	Download	Korean
March 4	Spring Love	Eric Nam x Wendy	Single	Download	Korean
March 11	Deoksugung Stonewall Walkway	Yoona & 10cm	Single	Download	Korean
March 16	The Velvet	Red Velvet	Extended play	CD, download	Korean
March 18	Your Voice	Heritage & Jonghyun	Single	Download	Korean
March 25	Borders	Amber	Single	Download	English
April 1	Regrets and Resolutions	Moon Jung-jae & Kim Il-ji	Single	Download	Korean
April 8	Lil' Something	Vibe, Chen & Heize	Single	Download	Korean
April 9	The 7th Sense	NCT U	Single	Download	Korean
April 10	Without You	NCT U	Single	Download	Korean & Chinese
April 15	Narcissus	M&D & Wheein	Single	Download	Korean
April 19	Here I Am	Yesung	Extended play	CD, download	Korean
April 20	SHINee World IV - The 4th Concert Album	Shinee	Live album	CD, download	Korean
April 22	Pain Poem	Kim Bum-soo & Kenzie	Single	Download	Korean
April 29	Mindjack	Inlayer	Single	Download	Korean
May 5	Wave	R3hab, Amber, Luna & Xavi&Gi	Single	Download	Korean
May 11	I Just Wanna Dance	Tiffany	Extended play	CD, download	Korean & English
May 13	The Day	K.Will & Baekhyun	Single	Download	Korean
May 18	On My Own	Amber & Gen Neo	Single	Download	Korean & English
May 18	Kimi No Sei De	Shinee	Single	CD Single, CD + DVD, Download	Japanese
May 20	Touch You	Dana	Single	Download	Korean
May 24	She Is	Jonghyun	Studio album	CD, download	Korean
May 25	Celebration	Kyuhyun	Single	CD single, CD + DVD, download	Japanese
May 30	BoA Special Live 2015 Nowness in Japan	BoA	Video album	DVD	Japanese
May 31	Free Somebody	Luna	Extended play	CD, download	Korean
June 3	You're The Boss	Yoon Jung-soo & Kim Sook	Single	Download	Korean
June 9	EX'ACT	Exo	Studio album	CD, download	Korean & Mandarin
June 10	Heartbreak Hotel	Tiffany & Simon D	Single	Download	Korean
June 17	No Matter What	BoA & Beenzino	Single	Download	Korean
June 24	Definition of Love	Lee Dong-woo & Orphée Noah	Single	Download	Korean
June 28	Why	Taeyeon	Extended play	CD, download	Korean
July 1	My Hero	Leeteuk, Suho, Kassy & Cho Yeong-soo	Single	Download	Korean
July 6	f(x) Dimension 4 – Docking Station in Japan	f(x)	Video album	DVD	Japanese
July 8	Way Back Home	J-Min & Shim Eun-jee	Single	Download	Korean
July 11	NCT #127	NCT 127	Extended play	CD, download	Korean
July 12	Goody Bag	Kim Heechul & Kim Jungmo	Extended play	CD, download	Korean
July 15	My Show	Cha Ji-yeon & LDN Noise	Single	Download	Korean
July 19	What's Your Number?	Zhou Mi	Extended play	CD, download	Korean & Mandarin
July 22	All Mine	f(x)	Single	Download	Korean
July 27	Solitary Goodbye	Taemin	Extended play	CD single, CD + DVD, download	Japanese
July 29	Taste The Feeling	NCT 127	Single	Download	Korean
August 5	Sailing (0805)	Girls' Generation	Single	Download	Korean
August 8	Ready For Your Love	J-Min	Single	Download	Korean
August 10	Vagabond	BeatBurger	Single	Download	Korean
August 12	Starry Night	Onew & Lee Jin-ah	Single	Download	Korean
August 18	Lotto	Exo	Repackage album	CD, download	Korean & Mandarin
August 19	Secret	Yuri & Seohyun	Single	Download	Korean
August 26	Born to be Wild	Triple T (Hyoyeon, Min & Jo Kwon) ft. J.Y. Park	Single	Download	Korean
August 27	Chewing Gum	NCT Dream	Single	Download	Korean & Mandarin
September 2	$10	Hitchhiker	Single	Download	Korean
September 6	Russian Roulette	Red Velvet	Extended play	CD, download	Korean
September 9	Pit a Pat 250 Remix	S.M. & BANA	Single	Download	TBA
September 9	Breathe Again	Ksuke & Amber	Single	Download	English
September 18	Dancing King	Yoo Jae-suk & Exo	Single	Download	Korean
September 23	Cosmic	Bada & Ryeowook	Single	Download	Korean
September 30	Heartbeat	Amber & Luna featuring Ferry Corsten & Kago Pengchi	Single	Download	Korean
October 5	1 of 1	Shinee	Studio album	Cassette, CD, download	Korean
October 7	Years	Alesso & Chen	Single	Download	Korean & Mandarin
October 14	Runnin'	Henry & Soyou	Single	Download	Korean
October 21	Music Is Wonderful	BeatBurger featuring BoA	Single	Download	Korean
October 27	Lose Control	Lay	Extended play	CD, download	Mandarin
October 28	Nightmare	Yoon Do-hyun, Reddy, G2, Inlayer & Johnny	Single	Download	Korean
October 31	Hey Mama!	EXO-CBX	Extended play	CD, download	Korean
November 1	11:11	Taeyeon	Single	Download	Korean
November 2	4 Walls/Cowboy	f(x)	Single	CD, DVD + CD, download	Japanese
November 3	'Home' Chapter 1	Kangta	Extended play	CD, download	Korean
November 4	Always In My Heart	Seulong & Joy	Single	Download	Korean
November 10	Waiting, Still	Kyuhyun	Extended play	CD, download	Korean
November 11	Still	Sunday & Kim Tae-hyun	Single	Download	Korean
November 15	1 and 1	Shinee	Repackage album	CD, download	Korean
November 19	Sweet Dream	Min Kyung-hoon & Heechul	Single	Download	Korean
November 27	Love [story]	S.E.S	Single	Download	Korean
December 2	Mystery	Hyoyeon	Single	Download	Korean
December 7	Coming Over	Exo	Single album	CD, download	Japanese
December 9	Inspiration	Jonghyun	Single	Download	Korean
December 16	It's You	Shin Yong-jae & Luna	Single	Download	Korean
December 19	For Life	Exo	Extended play	CD, download	Korean & Mandarin
December 21	Winter Wonderland	Shinee	Single	CD, DVD, download	Japanese
December 23	Have Yourself a Merry Little Christmas	Moon Jung-jae, Lee Na-il & Wendy	Single	Download	Korean
December 24	Walking	Lee Dong-woo	Studio album	CD, download	Korean & English
December 30	Sound of Your Heart	Steve Barakatt, Lee Dong-woo, Yesung, Sunny, Luna, Wendy, Seulgi, Taeil & Doyoung	Single	Download	Korean

=== 2017 ===
Released	Title	Artist	Type	Format	Language
January 2	Remember	S.E.S.	Studio album	CD, download	Korean
January 6	Limitless	NCT 127	Extended play	CD, download	Korean
January 7	Road	Trax	Digital single	Download	Korean
January 17	Don't Say No	Seohyun	Extended play	CD, download	Korean
January 22	Darling U	Yesung & Seulgi	Digital single	Download	Korean
February 1	Rookie	Red Velvet	Extended play	CD, download	Korean
February 8	One Voice	Kyuhyun	Studio album	CD + DVD, download	Japanese
February 9	The First	NCT Dream	Single album	CD, download	Korean
February 14	Rain	Soyou & Baekhyun	Digital single	Download	Korean
February 22	Five	SHINee	Studio album	CD + DVD, download	Japanese
February 28	My Voice	Taeyeon	Studio album	CD, download	Korean
March 20	Alive	J-Min	Digital single	Download	Korean
March 31	Would U	Red Velvet	Digital single	Download	Korean
April 5	My Voice (Deluxe Edition)	Taeyeon	Repackage album	CD, download	Korean
April 6	SM Station Season 1	Various Artists	Compilation album	CD, download	Korean
April 7	Dream in a Dream	Ten	Digital single	Download	English
April 14	Take You Home	Baekhyun	Digital single	Download	Korean
April 18	Spring Falling	Yesung	Extended play	CD, download	Korean
April 22	To Be Alive	The Stanley Clarke Band	Digital single	Download	Korean
April 24	The Collection: Story Op.2	Jonghyun	Compilation album	CD, download	Korean
April 29	Spring Rain	BoA	Digital single	Download	Korean
April 29	Real Love	Henry	Digital single	Download	Korean
May 5	Lullaby	Onew X Rocoberry	Digital single	Download	Korean
May 12	Around	Hitchkhiker X Taeyong	Digital single	Download	Korean
May 19	E-12 (Live)	Myron McKinley Trio	Digital single	Download	—N/a
May 24	Girls	EXO-CBX	Extended play	CD, download	Japanese
May 24	Goodbye for Now	Kyuhyun	Digital single	Download	Korean
May 26	Nostalgia	Jungmo X Kim Se-hwang	Digital single	Download	Korean
June 1	Wannabe	Hyoyeon	Digital single	Download	Korean
June 2	Marry Man	Shindong X UV	Digital single	Download	Korean
June 9	Easy	Vinicius	Digital single	Download	Korean
June 14	Cherry Bomb	NCT 127	Extended play	CD, download	Korean
June 16	New Beginning	Astrid Holiday	Digital single	Download	English
June 23	I"m Good	Henry	Digital single	Download	Korean
June 23	Stranger's Good	Jang Jin-young X The Barberettes	Digital single	Download	Korean
June 26	Camo	BoA	Digital single	Download	Korean
June 28	Splash / Aishiterutte Ienai	Yesung	Single album	CD, download	Japanese
June 30	Decalcomanie	IMLAY X Sik-K	Digital single	Download	Korean
July 7	Young & Free	Xiumin X Mark	Digital single	Download	Korean
July 9	The Red Summer	Red Velvet	Extended play	CD, download	Korean
July 14	All That You Want	The Solutions	Digital single	Download	Korean
July 18	Flame of Love	Taemin	Extended play	CD, download	Japanese
July 18	The War	Exo	Studio album	CD, download	Korean & Mandarin
July 21	Lemonade Love	Parc Jae-jung X Mark	Digital single	Download	Korean
July 28	Love Like You	Charli Taft	Digital single	Download	English
August 5	Cure	Yoo Young-jin X Taeyong	Digital single	Download	Korean
August 7	Holiday Night	Girls' Generation	Studio album	CD, download	Korean
August 11	Hunnit	Penomeco	Digital single	Download	Korean
August 17	We Young	NCT Dream	Extended play	CD, download	Korean & Mandarin
August 18	Rebirth	Red Velvet	Digital single	Download	Korean
August 28	Man in the Mirror	Stanley Clarke X Myron McKinley Trio	Digital single	Download	English
August 30	That One	Henry	Digital single	Download	English
September 5	The War: The Power of Music	EXO	Repackage album	CD, download	Korean & Mandarin
September 8	When The Wind Blows	Yoona	Digital single	Download	Korean & Mandarin
September 15	U&I	Sunny (singer) X Henry	Digital single	Download	Korean
September 25	Drop	TVXQ (U-Know & Yunho)	Digital single	Download	Korean
September 25	In A Different Life	Max Changmin	Digital single	Download	Korean
October 7	Lay 02 Sheep	Lay	Studio album	CD, download	Mandarin
October 13	Star Blossom	Doyoung X Kim Se-jeong	Digital single	Download	Korean
October 16	Move	Taemin	Studio album	CD, download	Korean
October 20	Power (Remix version)	EXO	Digital single	Download	Korean
October 20	EXO PLANET #3 -The EXO`rDIUM(dot)	EXO	Live album	CD, download	Korean
November 3	Bye Babe	10cm X Chen	Digital single	Download	Korean
November 6	Play	Super Junior	Studio album	CD, download	Korean
November 10	Thirsty (OFF-SICK Concert Ver.)	Taemin	Digital single	Download	Korean
November 16	Atmosphere	Juncoco X Advanced (feat. Ailee)	Digital single	Download	Korean
November 17	Perfect Velvet	Red Velvet	Studio album	CD, Download	Korean
November 24	Try Again	D.ear X Jaehyun	Digital single	Download	Korean
November 28	PLAY PAUSE Ver	Super Junior	Studio album	CD	Korean
December 1	The Little Match Girl	Baek A-yeon X Wendy	Digital single	Download	Korean
December 8	Charm of Life	Eunhyuk X Heechul X Shindong X Solar	Digital single	Download	Korean
December 10	Move-ing	Taemin	Repackage album	CD, download	Korean
December 12	This Christmas - Winter Is Coming	Taeyeon	Extended play	CD, download	Korean & English
December 15	JOY	NCT Dream	Digital single	Download	Korean
December 21	Universe	EXO	Extended play	CD, download	Korean & Mandarin

=== 2018 ===
Released	Title	Artist	Type	Format	Language
January 5	Lower	Amber X Luna	Digital single	Download	Korean
January 12	Timeless	NCT U	Digital single	Download	Korean
January 16	Man in the Mirror	BoA X Siedah Garrett	Digital single	Download	Korean
January 26	Always Find You	Raiden X Yuri	Digital single	Download	Korean
January 23	Poet I Artist	Jonghyun	Studio album	CD, Download	Korean
January 29	The Perfect Red Velvet	Red Velvet	Repackage album	CD, Download	Korean
January 31	Nega Dola	BoA	Digital single	Download	Korean
January 31	Countdown	Exo	Studio album	CD, Download	Japanese
February 2	Nikolai Kapustin : Piano Quinlet 1st Mov. Allegro	Moon Jung-jae X PACE	Digital single	Download	Instrumental
February 14	Watashi Kono Mama De Ii no Kana	BoA	Studio album	CD, Download	Japanese
February 17	I Kicked My Luck Off	Kang Ho-dong X Hong Jin-young	Digital single	Download	Korean
February 20	One Shot, Two Shot	BoA	Extended play	CD, Download	Korean
February 23	Notorious	TRAX X LIP2SHOT (feat. Sophiya)	Digital single	Download	Korean
March 2	Daydream	Sungmin	Digital single	Download	Korean
March 8	Dinner	Suho X Jang Jae-in	Digital single	Download	Korean
March 14	NCT 2018 Empathy	NCT	Studio album	CD, Download	Korean
March 16	Privacy	YESEO	Digital single	Download	Korean
March 23	Super Duper	Super Junior	Digital single	Download	Korean
March 28	New Chapter No.1: The Chance of Love	TVXQ	Studio album	CD, Download	Korean
March 30	You	GINJO (feat. ANGEL)	Digital single	Download	English
April 6	New Heroes	Ten	Digital single	Download	English
April 10	Blooming Days	Exo-CBX	Extended play	CD, Download	Korean
April 12	Replay	Super Junior	Repackage album	CD, Download	Korean
April 18	Sober	HYO (Feat. Ummet Ozcan)	Digital single	Download	Korean & English
April 24	Night Reminiscin'	Luna	Digital single	Download	Korean
May 9	Magic	Exo-CBX	Studio album	CD, Download	Japanese
May 13	To You	Yoona X Lee Sang-soon	Digital single	Download	Korean
May 23	Chain	NCT 127	Extended play	CD, Download	Japanese
May 28	The Story of Light EP 1	SHINee	Studio album	CD, Download	Korean
June 4	Baby don’t stop	Ten X Taeyong	Digital single	Download	Korean & Thai
June 11	The Story of Light EP 2	SHINee	Studio album	CD, Download	Korean
June 18	Something New	Taeyeon	Studio album	CD, Download	Korean
June 25	The Story of Light EP 3	SHINee	Studio album	CD, Download	Korean
June 29	Stay	Taeyeon	Digital single	Download	Japanese
July 4	#Cookie Jar	Red Velvet	Extended play	CD, Download	Japanese
August 6	Summer Magic	Red Velvet	Extended play	CD, Download	Korean
August 8	Style	Super Junior-D&E	Studio album	CD, Download	Japanese
August 10	Page 0	Taeyeon X MeloMance	Digital single	Download	Korean
August 16	'Bout You	Super Junior-D&E	Extended play	CD, Download	Korean
August 30	We Go Up	NCT Dream	Extended play	CD, Download	Korean & Mandarin
August 31	YOUNG	Baekhyun X Loco	Digital single	Download	Korean
September 5	몰랐니 (Lil' Touch)	Girls' Generation-Oh!GG	Single album	Download	Korean
September 10	The Story of Light Epilogue	SHINee	Repackage album	CD, Download	Korean
September 14	WE YOUNG	Chanyeol X Sehun	Digital single	Download	Korean & Mandarin
September 21	White Noise+Lost At Sea	Amber	Single album	Download	English
September 27	Animals	Super Junior	Digital single	Download	Korean
September 28	Wow Thing	Kim Chung-ha X Jeon So-yeon X Seulgi X SinB	Digital single	Download	Korean
October 4	The First Scene	Yuri	Extended play	CD, Download	Korean
October 7	Give Me A Chance	Lay	Digital single	Download	English
October 8	One More Time	Super Junior	Extended play	CD, Download	Korean
October 12	Regular-Irregular	NCT 127	Studio Album	CD, Download	Korean & English
October 19	NAMANANA	Lay	Studio Album	CD, Download	Mandarin & English
October 19	Written In The Stars	John Legend X Wendy	Digital single	Download	English
October 24	WOMAN	BoA	Studio album	CD, Download	Korean
October 30	Million (Feat. Dok2)	Moon	Digital single	Download	Korean
November 2	Don't Mess Up My Tempo	Exo	Studio album	CD, Download	Korean & Mandarin
November 6	Forever Yours (Feat. 소유)	Key	Digital single	Download	Korean
November 13	Punk Right Now	HYO	Digital single	Download	Korean
November 23	Regulate	NCT 127	Repackage album	CD, Download	Korean
November 26	Face	Key	Studio album	CD, Download	Korean
November 28	Taemin	Taemin	Studio album	CD, Download	Japanese
November 29	Coffee Break	Lucas X Jonah Nilsson	Digital single	Download	Korean
November 30	RBB	Red Velvet	Extended play	CD, Download	Korean
November 30	Countdown+Beautiful	Amber	Single album	Download	Korean & English
December 5	VOICE	Onew	Extended play	CD, Download	Korean
December 12	Escape	TraxX	Digital single	Download	Korean
December 13	Love Shot	EXO	Repackage album	CD, Download	Korean & Mandarin
December 13	Hair in the Air	Yeri X Renjun X Jeno X Jaemin	Digital single	Download	Korean
December 17	Whatcha Doin'	Yesung X Kim Chung-ha	Digital single	Download	Korean
December 24	When It's Christmas	Lay	Digital single	Download	Korean
December 26	New Chapter #2: The Truth of Love	TVXQ	Studio album	CD, Download	Korean
December 26	Hologram	Key	Single album	CD, Download	Japanese
December 26	Amor	BoA	Digital single	Download	Japanese
December 27	Candle Light	NCT Dream	Digital single	Download	Korean

=== 2019 ===
Released	Title	Artist	Type	Format	Language
January 2	Drunk on Love	Ryeowook	Extended play	CD, download	Korean
January 4	Even So	Luna	Digital single	Download	Korean
January 4	Bellboy	GXXD (feat. 식케이 (Sik-K), Coogie)	Digital single	Download	Korean
January 6	SAPPY	Red Velvet	Digital single	Download	Japanese
January 10	Carpet	Yesung X Bumkey	Digital single	Download	Korean
January 17	The Vision	WayV	Single album	Download	Mandarin
January 24	Loss	Colde	Digital single	Download	Korean
January 30	Exo Planet 4 - The Elyxion (dot)	Exo	Live album	CD, download	Korean
February 11	Want	Taemin	Extended play	CD, download	Korean
February 14	Cold	Key (Feat. Hanhae)	Digital single	Download	Korean
February 20	Story	Yesung	Studio album	CD, download	Japanese
February 28	Cheer Man	Shindong X UV	Digital single	Download	Korean
March 4	I Wanna Be	Key	Repackage album		Korean
March 8	Sayonara	Red Velvet	Digital single	Download	Japanese
March 14	스물에게 (Dear Diary)	Yeri	Digital single	Download	Korean
March 24	Four Seasons	Taeyeon	Single album	Download	Korean
March 28	I'm Home	Minho	Digital single	Download	Korean
April 1	Beautiful Goodbye	Chen	Extended play	CD, download	Korean
April 10	Paper Cuts	EXO-CBX	Digital single	Download	Japanese
April 14	Danger	Super Junior-D&E	Extended play	CD, download	Korean
April 17	Awaken	NCT 127	Studio album	CD, download	Japanese
April 24	Old Movie	Heechul	Digital single	Download	Korean
April 25	SSFW	Chanyeol	Digital single	Download	Korean, Japanese, & Mandarin
May 9	You	Xiumin	Digital single	Download	Korean
May 9	Take Off	WayV	Extended play	CD, download	Mandarin
May 24	We Are Superhuman	NCT 127	Extended play	CD, download	Korean
May 29	SAPPY	Red Velvet	Extended play	CD, download	Japanese
May 30	A Walk To Remember	Yoona	Extended play	CD, download	Korean
June 4	Feedback	BoA	Digital single	Download	Korean
June 5	Voice	Taeyeon	Extended play	CD, download	Japanese
June 12	True Colors	U-Know	Extended play	CD, download	Korean
June 18	Pink Magic	Yesung	Extended play	CD, download	Korean
June 19	The ReVe Festival: Day 1	Red Velvet	Extended play	CD, download	Korean
June 29	Goblin	Sulli	Digital single	Download	Korean
July 1	That's Okay	D.O.	Digital single	Download	Korean
July 10	City Lights	Baekhyun	Extended Play	CD, download	Korean
July 18	Long Flight	Taeyong	Digital single	Download	Korean
July 20	Badster	DJ HYO	Digital single	Download	Korean & English
July 22	What a Life	EXO-SC	Extended play	CD, download	Korean
July 23	Highway to Heaven	NCT 127	Digital single	Download	English
July 29	We Boom	NCT Dream	Extended play	CD, download	Korean
August 1	Milkshake	Red Velvet	Digital single	Download	Korean
August 2	The Only	Raiden (feat. Irene of Red Velvet)	Digital single	Download	Korean
August 6	Forever Young	Giant Pink (Feat. 릴러말즈)	Digital single	Download	Korean
August 20	The ReVe Festival: Day 2	Red Velvet	Extended Play	CD, download	Korean
August 29	Without U	IMLAY (Feat. Danyka Nadeau)	Digital single	Digital download	Korean
September 23	Movie on Weekend	Bray (Feat. Sohlhee)	Digital single	Digital download	Korean
October 1	Dear My Dear	Chen	Extended play	CD, download	Korean
October 4	SuperM	SuperM	Extended play	CD, download	Korean & English
October 14	Time_Slip	Super Junior	Studio album	CD, download	Korean
October 24	Neo City: Seoul – The Origin	NCT 127	Live album	CD, download	Korean
October 28	Purpose	Taeyeon	Studio album	CD, download	Korean
October 29	Take Over the Moon	WayV	Extended play	CD, download	Mandarin
November 4	Bird	EXO	Single album	Download	Japanese
November 20	This is Your Day (for every child, UNICEF)	BoA X J-Min X Siwon X Sunny X Taemin X Suho X Wendy X Doyoung	Digital single	Download	Korean
November 22	Orgel	Sungmin	Extended play	CD, download	Korean
November 27	Obsession	EXO	Studio album	CD, download	Korean
December 11	Starry Night	BoA	Extended play	CD, download	Korean
December 13	Coming Home	NCT U	Digital single	Download	Korean
December 15	하얀 겨울 (White Winter)	Kim Hee-chul X Lee Soo-geun	Digital single	Download	Korean
December 23	The ReVe Festival: Finale	Red Velvet	Compilation album	CD, download	Korean

== 2020s ==
=== 2020 ===
Released	Title	Artist	Type	Format	Language
January 15	Purpose	Taeyeon	Repackage album	CD, download	Korean
January 28	Time Slip	Super Junior	Repackage album	CD, download	Korean
January 29	I Think U	Super Junior	Extended play	CD, download	Japanese
February 19	Dystopia	Imlay	Extended play	Download	Korean, English
February 23	"Harmony"	Donghae (feat. BewhY)	Digital single	Download	Korean
February 24	"Lady"	Sohlhee	Digital single	Download	Korean
February 28	"I'll Be There"	Zhou Mi (with Kun, Xiaojun of WayV)	Digital single	Download	Mandarin
March 6	Neo Zone	NCT 127	Studio album	CD, download	Korean
March 13	Take Over the Moon - Sequel	WayV	Extended play	CD, download	Mandarin, English
March 30	Self-Portrait	Suho	Extended play	CD, download	Korean
April 6	Chocolate	Max	Extended play	CD, download	Korean
April 21	Exo Planet 5 – Exploration	EXO	Extended play	CD, download	Korean
April 29	Reload	NCT Dream	Extended play	CD, download	Korean
May 1	"Still Standing"	Yesung x Suran	Digital single	Download	Korean
May 4	"Happy"	Taeyeon	Digital single	Download	Korean
May 12	"Yours"	Raiden x Chanyeol (feat. Lee Hi, Changmo)	Digital single	Download	Korean
May 15	"Sugar"	Hitchhiker x Sokodomo	Digital single	Download	Korean
May 19	Neo Zone: The Final Round	NCT 127	Repackage album	CD, download	Korean
May 25	Delight	Baekhyun	Extended play	CD, download	Korean
June 8	When We Were Us	Super Junior-K.R.Y.	Extended play	CD, download	Korean
June 9	The Dream Show	NCT Dream	Live album	CD, download	Korean
June 9	Awaken the World	WayV	Studio album	CD, download	Mandarin
June 22	"Starry Night"	Zhoumi X Ryeowook	Digital single	Download	Korean & Mandarin
July 6	Monster	Red Velvet - Irene & Seulgi	Extended play	CD, download	Korean
July 13	1 Billion Views	Exo-SC	Studio album	CD, download	Korean
July 20	"Naughty"	Red Velvet - Irene & Seulgi	Digital single	Download	Korean
July 22	"Dessert"	DJ HYO	Digital single	Download	Korean
July 23	"Project: 季 - Dreaming"	Kyuhyun	Digital single	Download	Korean
July 29	"Bad Alive"	WayV	Digital single	Download	English
August 4	"2 Kids"	Taemin	Digital single	Download	Korean
September 3	Bad Blood	Super Junior-D&E	Extended play	CD, download	Korean
September 7	Never Gonna Dance Again: Act 1	Taemin	Studio album	CD, download	Korean
September 25	Super One	SuperM	Studio album	CD, download	Korean
September 28	Bad Liar	Super Junior-D&E	Repackage album	CD, download	Korean
October 8	"Project: 季 - Daystar"	Kyuhyun	Digital single	Download	Korean
October 12	NCT 2020 Resonance Pt. 1	NCT	Studio album	CD, download	Korean & Mandarin
October 15	"Hello"	Chen	Digital single	Download	Korean
November 4	"I Believe"	BoA	Single album	CD, download	Japanese
November 9	Never Gonna Dance Again: Act 2	Taemin	Studio album	CD, download	Korean
November 17	"Black Mamba"	Aespa	Digital single	Download	Korean
November 18	#GirlsSpkOut	Taeyeon	Extended play	CD, download	Japanese
November 23	NCT 2020 Resonance Pt. 2	NCT	Studio album	CD, download	Korean
November 30	Kai	Kai	Extended play	CD, download	Korean
December 1	Better	BoA	Studio album	CD, download	Korean
December 4	"Resonance"	NCT	Digital single	Download	Korean
November 9	Never Gonna Dance Again	Taemin	Repackage album	CD, download	Korean
December 15	What Do I Call You	Taeyeon	Extended play	CD, download	Korean
December 21	"Amusement Park"	Baekhyun	Digital single	Download	Korean

=== 2021 ===
Released	Title	Artist	Type	Format	Language
January 15	"Cough Syrup"	Kangta	Digital single	Download	Korean
January 18	Noir	U-Know	Extended play	CD, download	Korean
January 20	Baekhyun	Baekhyun	Extended play	CD, download	Japanese
January 26	"2021 Project: 季 - Moving On"	Kyuhyun	Digital single	Download	Korean
January 27	Star	Super Junior	Compilation album	CD, download	Japanese
January 27	"First Love"	NCT 127	Digital single	Download	Korean
February 5	"Forever"	Aespa	Digital single	Download	Korean
February 17	Loveholic	NCT 127	Extended play	CD, download	Japanese
February 22	Don't Call Me	Shinee	Studio album	CD, download	Korean
February 24	Utopia	Imlay	Extended play	Download	Korean
March 10	Kick Back	WayV	Extended play	CD, download	Mandarin
March 16	The Renaissance	Super Junior	Studio album	CD, download	Korean
March 24	"Freezing"	Kangta	Digital single	Download	Korean
March 30	Bambi	Baekhyun	Extended play	CD, download	Korean
April 5	Like Water	Wendy	Extended play	CD, download	Korean
April 6	"Tomorrow"	Chanyeol	Digital single	Download	Korean
April 9	"We Do"	SuperM	Digital single	Download	English
April 12	Atlantis	Shinee	Repackage album	CD, download	Korean
April 13	"2021 Project: 季 - Coffee"	Kyuhyun	Digital single	Download	Korean
May 3	Beautiful Night	Yesung	Extended play	CD, download	Korean
May 10	Hot Sauce	NCT Dream	Studio album	CD, download	Korean
May 17	"Next Level"	Aespa	Digital single	Download	Korean
May 18	Advice	Taemin	Extended play	CD, download	Korean
May 31	Hello	Joy	Extended play	CD, download	Korean
June 4	"Save"	NCT 127	Digital single	Download	Korean
June 7	Don't Fight the Feeling	Exo	Extended play	CD, download	Korean
June 16	Back to You	WayV - Kun & Xiaojun	Single album	Download	Mandarin, English
June 28	Hello Future	NCT Dream	Repackage album	CD, download	Korean
July 5	"2021 Project: 季 - Together"	Kyuhyun	Digital single	Download	Korean
July 6	"Weekend"	Taeyeon	Digital single	Download	Korean
July 14	"Free To Fly 2021"	Kangta	Digital single	Download	Korean
July 26	Empathy	D.O.	Extended play	CD, download	Korean
July 28	"Christmas in July"	Kangta	Digital single	Download	Korean
July 28	Superstar	Shinee	Extended play	CD, download	Japanese
August 9	"Second"	DJ HYO	Digital single	Download	Korean
August 10	"Paint Me Naked"	Ten	Digital single	Download	Korean
August 16	Queendom	Red Velvet	Extended play	CD, download	Korean
August 17	"Low Low"	WayV - Ten & Yangyang	Digital single	Download	English
August 30	"Hate That..."	Key	Digital single	Download	Korean
September 7	"Goodnight, Summer"	Sungmin	Digital single	Download	Korean
September 17	Sticker	NCT 127	Studio album	CD, download	Korean
September 27	Bad Love	Key	Extended play	CD, download	Korean
October 5	Savage	Aespa	Extended play	CD, download	Korean
October 11	Love Right Back	Raiden	Extended play	CD, download	Korean
October 12	"Maybe"	Kangta	Digital single	Download	Korean
October 13	"California Love"	Donghae	Digital single	Download	Korean
October 20	"Be"	Eunhyuk	Digital single	Download	Korean
October 25	Favorite	NCT 127	Repackage album	CD, download	Korean
November 2	Countdown	Super Junior-D&E	Studio album	CD, download	Korean
November 5	"My Dear"	BoA	Digital single	Download	Japanese
November 30	Peaches	Kai	Extended play	CD, download	Korean
December 8	Human	Max	Extended play	CD, download	Japanese
December 10	Countdown - Zero ver. (Epilogue)	Super Junior-D&E	Repackage album	CD, download	Korean
December 10	"Universe (Let's Play Ball)"	NCT U	Digital single	Download	Korean
December 14	Universe	NCT	Studio album	CD, download	Korean
December 20	"Dreams Come True"	Aespa	Digital single	Download	Korean
December 21	"Heartbreak"	Minho	Digital single	Download	Korean
December 27	2021 Winter SM Town: SMCU Express	SMTOWN	Studio album	CD, download	Korean

=== 2022 ===
Released	Title	Artist	Type	Format	Language
January 3	"Step Back"	Got the Beat	Digital single	Download	Korean
January 12	"Slow Dance"	Kangta	Digital single	Download	Korean
January 13	Devil	Max	Extended play	CD, download	Korean
January 17	"Can't Control Myself"	Taeyeon	Digital single	Download	Korean
January 25	Love Story (4 Season Project 季)	Kyuhyun	Extended play	CD, download	Korean
February 4	"Child"	Mark	Digital single	Download	Korean
February 9	Kimi wa Saki e Iku	U-Know	Extended play	CD, download	Japanese
February 14	INVU	Taeyeon	Studio album	CD, download	Korean
February 28	The Road : Winter for Spring	Super Junior	Single album	CD, download	Korean
March 16	Epitaph	TVXQ	Extended play	CD, download	Japanese
March 20	"Conextion (Age of Light)"	NCT U	Digital single	Download	Korean
March 21	The ReVe Festival 2022 – Feel My Rhythm	Red Velvet	Extended play	CD, download	Korean
March 28	Glitch Mode	NCT Dream	Studio album	CD, download	Korean
April 4	Grey Suit	Suho	Extended play	CD, download	Korean
April 6	Bloom	Red Velvet	Studio album	CD, download	Japanese
April 11	Dice	Onew	Extended play	CD, download	Korean
April 14	"Love Theory"	Taeyong (feat. Wonstein)	Digital single	Download	Korean
May 3	A Wild Rose	Ryeowook	Extended play	CD, download	Korean
May 16	Deep	Hyo	Extended play	CD, download	Korean
May 30	The Greatest	BoA	Compilation album	CD, download	Japanese
May 30	Beatbox	NCT Dream	Repackage album	CD, download	Korean
June 1	Who Sings? Vol.1	Onew	Extended play	Download	Japanese
June 1	"Illusion"	Aespa	Digital single	Download	Korean
June 24	"Life's Too Short"	Aespa	Digital single	Download	English
July 6	Life Goes On	Onew	Studio album	CD, download	Japanese
July 8	Girls	Aespa	Extended play	CD, download	Korean
July 12	The Road: Keep On Going	Super Junior	Extended play	CD, download	Korean
July 19	"Rain Day"	NCT U	Digital single	Download	Korean
August 5	Forever 1	Girls' Generation	Studio album	CD, download	Korean
August 17	"Utsuroi"	TVXQ	Single album	CD, download	Japanese
August 18	"Forever Only"	Jaehyun	Digital single	Download	Korean
August 24	"Romeo and Juliet"	Minho	Digital single	Download	Japanese
August 24	"Falling Free"	Minho	Digital single	Download	Japanese
August 25	"Nap Fairy"	Yeri x Sam Kim	Digital single	Download	Korean
August 30	Gasoline	Key	Studio album	CD, download	Korean
September 7	Eyes On You	Kangta	Studio album	CD, download	Korean
September 9	"Dance Whole Day"	Onew	Digital single	Download	Japanese
September 16	2 Baddies	NCT 127	Studio album	CD, download	Korean
September 26	Brand New	Xiumin	Extended play	CD, download	Korean
October 4	28 Reasons	Seulgi	Extended play	CD, download	Korean
October 26	"Birthday"	Ten	Digital single	Download	English
November 14	Last Scene	Chen	Extended play	CD, download	Korean
November 22	Forgive Me	BoA	Extended play	CD, download	Korean
November 28	The ReVe Festival 2022 - Birthday	Red Velvet	Extended play	CD, download	Korean
December 6	Chase	Minho	Extended play	CD, download	Korean
December 15	The Road: Celebration	Super Junior	Extended play	CD, download	Korean
December 19	Candy	NCT Dream	Extended play	CD, download	Korean
December 26	2022 Winter SM Town: SMCU Palace	SM Town	Studio album	CD, download	Korean
December 28	Phantom	WayV	Extended play	CD, download	Mandarin

=== 2023 ===
Released	Title	Artist	Type	Format	Language	Ref.
January 16	Stamp on It	Got the Beat	Extended play	CD, download	Korean	
January 25	Sensory Flows	Yesung	Studio album	CD, download	Korean	
January 26	"Miracle"	MeloMance x Wendy	Digital single	Download	Korean	
January 30	Ay-Yo	NCT 127	Repackage album	CD, download	Korean	
January 31	"Parallel Parallel"	TVXQ	Single album	CD, download	Japanese	
February 8	"Best Friend Ever"	NCT Dream	Single album	CD, download	Japanese	
February 13	Killer	Key	Repackage album	CD, download	Korean	
February 27	Floral Sense	Yesung	Repackage album	CD, download	Korean	
February 28	"Love Me Crazy"	Lim Kim x Jamie	Digital single	Download	Korean	
March 6	Circle	Onew	Studio album	CD, download	Korean	
March 13	Rover	Kai	Extended play	CD, download	Korean	
March 21	"Beatbox" (English version)	NCT Dream	Digital single	Download	English	
March 31	"Hold on Tight"	Aespa	Digital single	Download	English	
April 7	"Golden Hour"	Mark	Digital single	Download	Korean	
April 15	"Bird (The Best version)"	Exo	Digital single	Download	Japanese	
April 17	Perfume	NCT DoJaeJung	Extended play	CD, download	Korean	
April 22	"When I Close My Eyes"	Kangta x Lee A-reum	Digital single	Download	Korean	
May 2	"Welcome to My World"	Aespa (feat. Naevis)	Digital single	Download	Korean	
May 4	"Hybrid"	Max Changmin x Ha Hyun-woo	Digital single	Download	Korean	
May 8	My World	Aespa	Extended play	CD, download	Korean	
May 10	"Lovesick"	Sungmin	Digital single	Download	Korean	
May 30	"Bloom"	Yang Hee-eun x Chen	Digital single	Download	Korean	
June 5	Shalala	Taeyong	Extended play	CD, download	Korean	
June 12	"Lime & Lemon"	TVXQ	Single album	Download	Korean	
June 12	"Let Me In"	Exo	Digital single	Download	Korean	
June 19	"Broken Melodies"	NCT Dream	Digital single	Download	Korean	
June 26	Hard	Shinee	Studio album	CD, download	Korean	
June 30	"Hear Me Out"	Exo	Digital single	Download	Korean	
July 10	Exist	Exo	Studio album	CD, download	Korean	
July 17	ISTJ	NCT Dream	Studio album	CD, download	Korean	
August 7	Reality Show	U-Know	Extended play	CD, download	Korean	
August 8	"Horizon"	Jaehyun	Digital single	Download	Korean	
August 17	Polaris	Chen	Extended play	CD, download	Japanese	
August 18	"Better Things"	Aespa	Digital single	Download	English	
August 21	"Memories"	Riize	Digital single	Download	Korean	
August 22	"Picture"	Hyo	Digital single	Download	Korean	
August 23	"Golden Age"	NCT	Digital single	Download	Korean	
August 28	Golden Age	NCT	Studio album	CD, download	Korean	
September 4	Get a Guitar	Riize	Single album	CD, download	Korean	
September 7	"N.Y.C.T"	NCT U	Digital single	Download	Korean	
September 11	Good & Great	Key	Extended play	CD, download	Korean	
September 18	Expectation	D.O.	Extended play	CD, download	Korean	
October 4	Unfading Sense	Yesung	Extended play	CD, download	Korean	
October 6	Fact Check	NCT 127	Studio album	CD, download	Korean	
October 8	"Hands Up"	NCT New Team	Digital single	Download	Japanese	
October 20	"Good Enough"	Chanyeol	Digital single	Download	Korean	
October 27	"Talk Saxy"	Riize	Digital single	Download	Korean	
October 30	Guilty	Taemin	Extended play	CD, download	Korean	
November 1	On My Youth	WayV	Studio album	CD, download	Mandarin	
November 10	Drama	Aespa	Extended play	CD, download	Korean	
November 13	Chill Kill	Red Velvet	Studio album	CD, download	Korean	
November 27	To. X	Taeyeon	Extended play	CD, download	Korean	
December 22	Be There for Me	NCT 127	Single album	CD, download	Korean	
December 26	20&2	TVXQ	Studio album	CD, download	Korean	
December 29	Stardust	Imlay	Extended play	CD, download	English	

=== 2024 ===
Released	Title	Artist	Type	Format	Language	Ref.
January 5	"Love 119"	Riize	Digital single	Download	Korean	
January 6	"Stay For a Night"	Minho	Digital single	Download	Korean	
January 17	Let's Standing Show	Super Junior-L.S.S.	Extended play	CD, download	Japanese	
January 22	"Suit Up"	Super Junior-L.S.S.	Digital single	Download	Korean	
January 24	"Love 119" (Japanese ver.)	Riize	Digital single	Download	Japanese	
February 3	"C'mon"	Super Junior-L.S.S.	Digital single	Download	Korean	
February 8	"Joke"	Super Junior-L.S.S.	Digital single	Download	Korean	
February 13	Ten	Ten	Extended play	CD, download	English	
February 26	Tap	Taeyong	Extended play	CD, download	Korean	
February 28	Wish	NCT Wish	Single album	CD, download	Japanese, Korean	
March 12	Wish You Hell	Wendy	Extended play	CD, download	Korean	
March 25	Dream()Scape	NCT Dream	Extended play	CD, download	Korean	
March 26	"Emptiness"	BoA	Digital single	Download	Korean	
April 1	Renegade	Lucas	Single album	CD, download	English	
April 3	"Siren"	Riize	Digital single	Download	Korean	
April 18	"Impossible"	Riize	Digital single	Download	Korean	
April 22	Youth	Doyoung	Studio album	CD, download	Korean	
April 29	"9 Days"	Riize	Digital single	Download	Korean	
April 29	"Honestly"	Riize	Digital single	Download	Korean	
April 29	"One Kiss"	Riize	Digital single	Download	Korean	
May 13	"Supernova"	Aespa	Digital single	Download	Korean	
May 16	"200"	Mark	Digital single	Download	Korean	
May 27	Armageddon	Aespa	Studio album	CD, download	Korean	
June 3	Give Me That	WayV	Extended play	CD, download	Chinese, Korean	
June 5	"Moonlight"	NCT Dream	Single album	CD, download	Japanese	
June 11	"Show Time"	Super Junior	Digital single	Download	Korean	
June 17	Riizing	Riize	Extended play	CD, download	Korean	
June 24	Cosmic	Red Velvet	Extended play	CD, download	Korean	
July 1	Songbird	NCT Wish	Single album	CD, download	Japanese, Korean	
July 2	"Tongue Tied"	Key	Digital single	Download	Japanese	
July 8	"Heaven"	Taeyeon	Digital single	Download	Korean	
July 15	Walk	NCT 127	Studio album	CD, download	Korean	
July 29	"Lucky"	Riize	Single album	Download	Japanese	
August 8	The Highest	WayV	Extended play	Download	Japanese	
August 12	"Dandelion" & "Roses"	Jaehyun	Digital single	Download	Korean	
August 23	"Rains in Heaven"	NCT Dream	Digital single	Download	English	
August 26	J	Jaehyun	Studio album	CD, download	Korean	
August 28	Black Out	Chanyeol	Extended play	CD, download	Korean	
September 4	"Combo"	Riize	Digital Single	Download	Korean	
September 5	"Lucky"	Riize	Single album	CD	Japanese	
September 9	"Dunk Shot"	NCT Wish	Digital single	Download	Korean	
September 10	"Done"	Naevis	Digital single	Download	English	
September 11	"Utopia" (feat. WayV's Hendery)	Zhou Mi	Digital single	Download	Korean, Chinese	
September 19	Riizing: Epilogue	Riize	Extended play	CD, download	Korean	
September 23	Pleasure Shop	Key	Extended play	CD, download	Korean	
September 24	Steady	NCT Wish	Extended play	CD, download	Korean	
September 25	The Highest	WayV	Extended play	CD, download	Japanese	
September 26	"Retro Romance"	Hyo	Digital Single	Download	English	
October 3	Depth	Yuta	Extended play	CD, Download	English, Japanese	
October 9	Synk: Parallel Line	Aespa	Single album	Download	Korean	
October 21	Whiplash	Aespa	Extended play	CD, download	Korean	
November 4	Call Back	Minho	Studio album	CD, download	Korean	
November 5	It's Complicated	Yesung	Extended play	CD, download	Korean	
November 11	Dreamscape	NCT Dream	Studio album	CD, download	Korean	
November 18	Letter To Myself	Taeyeon	Extended play	CD, download	Korean	
November 21	Ex Games	Zhou Mi	Digital Single	Download	Korean, Chinese	
November 25	Frequency	WayV	Extended play	CD, download	Korean, Chinese	
November 26	Like a Flower	Irene	Extended play	CD, download	Korean	
December 25	Wishful	NCT Wish	Studio album	CD, download	Japanese	

=== 2025 ===
Released	Title	Artist	Type	Format	Language	Ref.
February 14	2025 SM Town: The Culture, the Future	SM Town	Studio album	CD, download	Korean	
February 24	The Chase	Hearts2Hearts	Single album	CD, download	Korean	
March 10	Accidentally on Purpose	Seulgi	Extended Play	CD, download	Korean	
March 24	Stunner	Ten	Extended Play	CD, download	Korean	
April 7	The Firstfruit	Mark	Studio Album	CD, download	Korean	
April 14	Poppop	NCT Wish	Extended Play	CD, download	Korean	
April 18	Pon Pon	Super Junior-L.S.S.	Single album	CD, download	Japanese	
April 21	Wait on Me	Kai	Extended Play	CD, download	Korean	
April 23	Humanity	Ten	Extended Play	CD, download	Japanese	
May 14	Twisted Paradise	Yuta	Extended Play	CD, download	Japanese	
May 19	Odyssey	Riize	Studio Album	CD, download	Korean	
May 25	Poet Artist	Shinee	Single album	CD, download	Korean	
May 26	Tilt	Red Velvet - Irene & Seulgi	Extended Play	CD, download	Korean	
May 30	"Young & Free"	BoA	Digital single	Download	Japanese	
June 9	Soar	Doyoung	Studio Album	CD, download	Korean	
June 18	"Style"	Hearts2Hearts	Digital Single	Download	Korean	
June 27	Dirty Work	Aespa	Single album	CD, download	Korean	
July 8	Super Junior25	Super Junior	Studio album	CD, download	Korean	
July 14	Go Back to the Future	NCT Dream	Studio album	CD, download	Korean	
July 16	"Yes"	Hyo	Digital Single	Download	English	
July 18	Big Bands	WayV	Extended Play	CD, download	Chinese	
July 31	Waste No Time	XngHan	Single album	CD, download	Korean	
August 4	Crazier	BoA	Studio Album	CD, download	Korean	
August 7	"Sensitive"	Naevis	Digital Single	Download	Korean	
August 10	"Good For U"	BoA	Digital Single	Download	Japanese	
August 11	Hunter	Key	Studio Album	CD, download	Korean	
August 12	"Surf"	NCT Wish	Digital Single	Download	Korean	
August 18	From Joy, with Love	Joy	Extended Play	CD, download	Korean	
August 25	Upside Down	Chanyeol	Extended Play	CD, download	Korean	
September 1	Color	NCT Wish	Extended Play	CD, download	Korean	
September 5	Rich Man	Aespa	Extended Play	CD, download	Korean	
September 8	Taste	Haechan	Studio Album	CD, download	Korean	
September 22	Who Are You	Suho	Extended Play	CD, download	Korean	
October 20	Focus	Hearts2Hearts	Extended Play	CD, download	Korean	
October 22	Everyday	Chanyeol	Extended Play	CD, download	Japanese	
October 26	Persona	Yuta	Studio Album	CD, download	Japanese	
November 5	I-Know	U-Know	Studio Album	CD, download	Korean	
November 17	Beat It Up	NCT Dream	Extended Play	CD, download	Korean	
November 17	Synk: Aexis Line	Aespa	Single Album	Download	Korean	
November 24	Fame	Riize	Single Album	CD, digital download, streaming	Korean	
November 28	"Sugar"	Jungwoo	Digital Single	Download	Korean	
December 1	Panorama: The Best of Taeyeon	Taeyeon	Compilation Album	CD, digital download, streaming	Korean	
December 8	Eternal White	WayV	Extended Play	CD, digital download, streaming	Korean, Chinese	
December 9	"Promise"	Doyoung	Digital Single	Download	Korean	
December 15	Tempo	Minho	Single Album	CD, digital download, streaming	Korean	
December 16	Bring it Back	GPP	Digital Single	Download	Japanese	
December 19	"Wish to Wish"	Yoona	Digital Single	Download	Korean	

=== 2026 ===
Released	Title	Artist	Type	Format	Language	Ref.
January 14	Wishlist	NCT Wish	Extended Play	CD, digital download, streaming	Japanese	
January 19	Reverxe	Exo	Studio Album	CD, digital download, streaming	Korean	
February 18	"All of You"	Riize	Single	CD, digital download, streaming	Japanese	
February 20	"Rude!"	Hearts2Hearts	Digital Single	Digital download, streaming	Korean	
February 23	Both Sides	NCT JNJM	Extended Play	CD, digital download, streaming	Korean	
March 23	"Moveurbody"	Hyo	Digital Single	Digital download, streaming	Korean	
March 30	Biggest Fan	Irene	Studio Album	CD, digital download, streaming	Korean	
April 17	"Rock Solid"	Taeyong (feat. Anderson .Paak)	Digital Single	Digital download, streaming	Korean	
April 20	Ode to Love	NCT Wish	Studio Album	CD, digital download, streaming	Korean	
April 27	Glow	XngHan	Extended Play	CD, digital download, streaming	Korean	
May 11	"WDA (Whole Different Animal)"	Aespa	Digital Single	Digital download, streaming	Korean	
May 18	WYLD	Taeyong	Studio Album	CD, digital download, streaming	Korean	
May 27	Sakihokoru Toki wo Matsu no wa	Yesung	Studio Album	CD, digital download, streaming	Japanese	
May 29	Lemonade	Aespa	Studio Album	CD, digital download, streaming	Korean	
June 1	Atmos	Shinee	Extended play	CD, digital download, streaming	Korean	
June 15	II	Riize	Extended play	CD, digital download, streaming	Korean	
June 22	Lemon Tang	Hearts2Hearts	Extended play	CD, digital download, streaming	Korean	
June 23	"Runaway"	Ryeowook	Single	CD, digital download, streaming	Korean	
July 10	"99 Degrees"	Jaehyun	Digital Single	Digital download, streaming	Korean	
July 13	Promise for You (Promise)	Super Junior-83z	Extended play	CD, digital download, streaming	Korean	
July 15	YO-I-DON!/Boy Meets Girl	NCT Wish	Single	CD, digital download, streaming	Japanese	
July 20	"Time's Tickin'"	U-Know	Single	CD, digital download, streaming	Korean	
July 24	Kiss n Tell	Aespa	Extended play	CD, digital download, streaming	Japanese	
August 3	Velvet Summer	Red Velvet	Extended play	CD, digital download, streaming	Korean	
August 8	Vision Wings	WayV	Extended play	CD, digital download, streaming	Chinese, Korean	
August 12	"Iconic Heart"	Hearts2Hearts	Single	CD, digital download, streaming	Japanese	
August 24	Blingy	NCT 127	Studio Album	CD, digital download, streaming	Korean	
August 26	"Sunburst"	Riize	Single	CD, digital download, streaming	Japanese	
August 31	"Skibidi"	Girls' Generation-HRS	Digital single	Digital download, streaming	Korean	
September 7	Make It Hot	Minho	Extended play	CD, digital download, streaming	Korean	
September 30	"High Beam"	XngHan	Single	CD, digital download, streaming	Japanese	
December 1	Waking Up The City	EXO-KaSe	Extended play	CD, digital download, streaming	Korean	

== See also ==
- Label SJ discography
- ScreaM Records discography
