= Zhang Liyin discography =

- Studio albums: 2
- Singles: 22
- Music videos: 12

Chinese singer Zhang Liyin has released two studio albums, twenty two singles and four soundtrack appearances.

Zhang began her career in South Korea signed SM Entertainment and released debut single "Timeless" in September 2006 and later the Chinese version of "Timeless" were released in 2007 in Taiwan. Zhang officially entered the chinese music scene in 2008 with released her first studio album I Will. In 2009, her second single "Moving On" were released. Zhang released two singles: "Agape" and "Not Alone" in 2014, five years after the release of "Moving On", in 2023 she released her long-waited second studio album The Tide of Life.

== Studio albums ==
Title	Album details	Peak chart positions		Sales
Title	Album details	KOR	TWN	Sales
I Will	Released: March 3, 2008; Label: SM Entertainment, Avex Group; Format: CD, CD + DVD, digital download	22	5	KOR: 2,186
The Tide of Life	Released: December 19, 2023; Label: iFLYTEK Music; Format: Digital download, streaming	-	-	

== Singles ==
Title	Year	Peak chart positions					Sales	Album
Title	Year	CHN		KOR		TWN	Sales	Album
Title	Year	Baidu	Chinese Songs	RIAK	Gaon Overseas	TWN	Sales	Album
"Timeless"	2006	—	27	10	—	—	KOR: 14,231	I Will
"星愿 (I Will)"	2008	—	11	—	—	7		I Will
"Moving On"	2009	—	—	—	—	—		Non-album singles
"呼吸 (Breath)" (with Chen) (Chinese version)	2014	—	—	—	8	—	KOR: 29,288	SM the Ballad Vol. 2 – Breath
"Agape"	2014	13	—	—	42	—	KOR: 5,773	Non album-singles
"Not Alone"	2014	4	—	—	51	—	KOR: 4,349	Non album-singles
"簇拥烈日的花" (Flowers Aglow)	2022	—	—	—	—	—		Non album-singles
"三星堆" (Sanxingdui)	2022	—	—	—	—	—		Non album-singles
"时光海岸" (The Tide of Life)	2022	—	—	—	—	—		The Tide of Life
"从我世界路过的你" (You Who Passed Through My World)	2022	—	—	—	—	—		The Tide of Life
"明明却" (Clearly, However)	2022	—	—	—	—	—		The Tide of Life
"坠落星空的鲸" (Whales Falling into the Starry Sky)	2022	—	—	—	—	—		The Tide of Life
"克莱因蓝的孤独" (The Solitude of Klein Blue)	2022	—	—	—	—	—		The Tide of Life
"向上生长的绿" (Green Growing Upwards)	2023	—	—	—	—	—		The Tide of Life
"永远去哪了" (Where Has Forever Gone)	2023	—	—	—	—	—		The Tide of Life
"言而无信" (Break One's Promise)	2023	—	—	—	—	—		The Tide of Life
"都给TA" (Give It to TA)	2023	—	—	—	—	—		The Tide of Life
"威尼斯的雪" (Snow in Venice)	2023	—	—	—	—	—		The Tide of Life
"记忆" (Memory)	2023	—	—	—	—	—		Non album-singles
"감각" (Emotion)	2023	—	—	—	—	—		Non album-singles
"不要说再见" (Don't Say Goodbye)	2023	—	—	—	—	—		Non album-singles
"어떤가요" (How Have You Been?) (with Lee Jung-bong)	2024	—	—	—	—	—		Non album-singles

== Soundtrack appearances ==
Title	Year	Album
"Lovers"	2007	Dear My Love OST
"答案" (Answer)	2019	The Remedy OST (漫长的告别)
"时间的灰" (Ashes of Time)	2020	Sword and Fire OST (挑灯斩蛇录)
"给亲爱的你" (For Dear You)	2021	Once Given Never Forgotten OST (你的名字我的姓氏)

== Other releases ==
Title	Year	Album
"Heaven"	2006	2006 Winter SMTown – Snow Dream
"Tri-Angle" (with TVXQ)	2007	The 2nd Asia Tour Concert Album "O"
"Under the Sea" (with Dana, Stephanie, Leeteuk, Heechul, Yesung, Kangin, Eunhyuk, Donghae, Sungmin, Ryeowook)	2007	2007 Summer SMTown – Fragile
"Oh Holy Night"	2007	2007 Winter SMTown – Only Love
"我们在上海" (We Are In Shanghai) (with Eason Chan, Fish Leong, Show Lo, Anson Hu, Super Junior-M, BOBO, Xiao Ke, Luo Zhongxu, Luo Haiqiong, Lan Yan, Xue Jianing, Zeng Li, Pu Bajia, Yu Siyuan, Niu Mengmeng, Zhao Lin)	2009	Non-album single
"The First Noël"	2011	Winter: The Warmest Gift
"Set Me Free (放过我)" (Chinese version)	2014	SM the Ballad Vol. 2 – Breath
"生命之光" (Light of Life)	2022	成都城市推荐曲 (Chengdu City Recommended Song)

== Music videos ==
Year	Music video	Album	Language
2006	"Timeless"	I Will	Korean
2006	"Y (Why...)"	I Will	Korean
2007	"Y (Why...)" (Documentary)	I Will	Korean
2008	星愿 (I Will)	I Will	Korean
2008	星愿 (I Will)	I Will	Mandarin
2008	幸福的左岸 (The Left Shore of Happiness)	I Will	Korean
2008	幸福的左岸 (The Left Shore of Happiness)	I Will	Mandarin
2008	"Timeless"	I Will	Mandarin
2009	"我们在上海" (We Are In Shanghai)	None	Mandarin
2009	"Moving On"	None	Mandarin
2014	"呼吸 (Breath)"	Breath	Mandarin
2014	"Agape"	None	Mandarin
2014	"Not Alone"	None	Mandarin
2014	"Agape & Not Alone"	None	Mandarin
