= UEFA Euro 2016 broadcasting rights =

Football tournament broadcasting rights

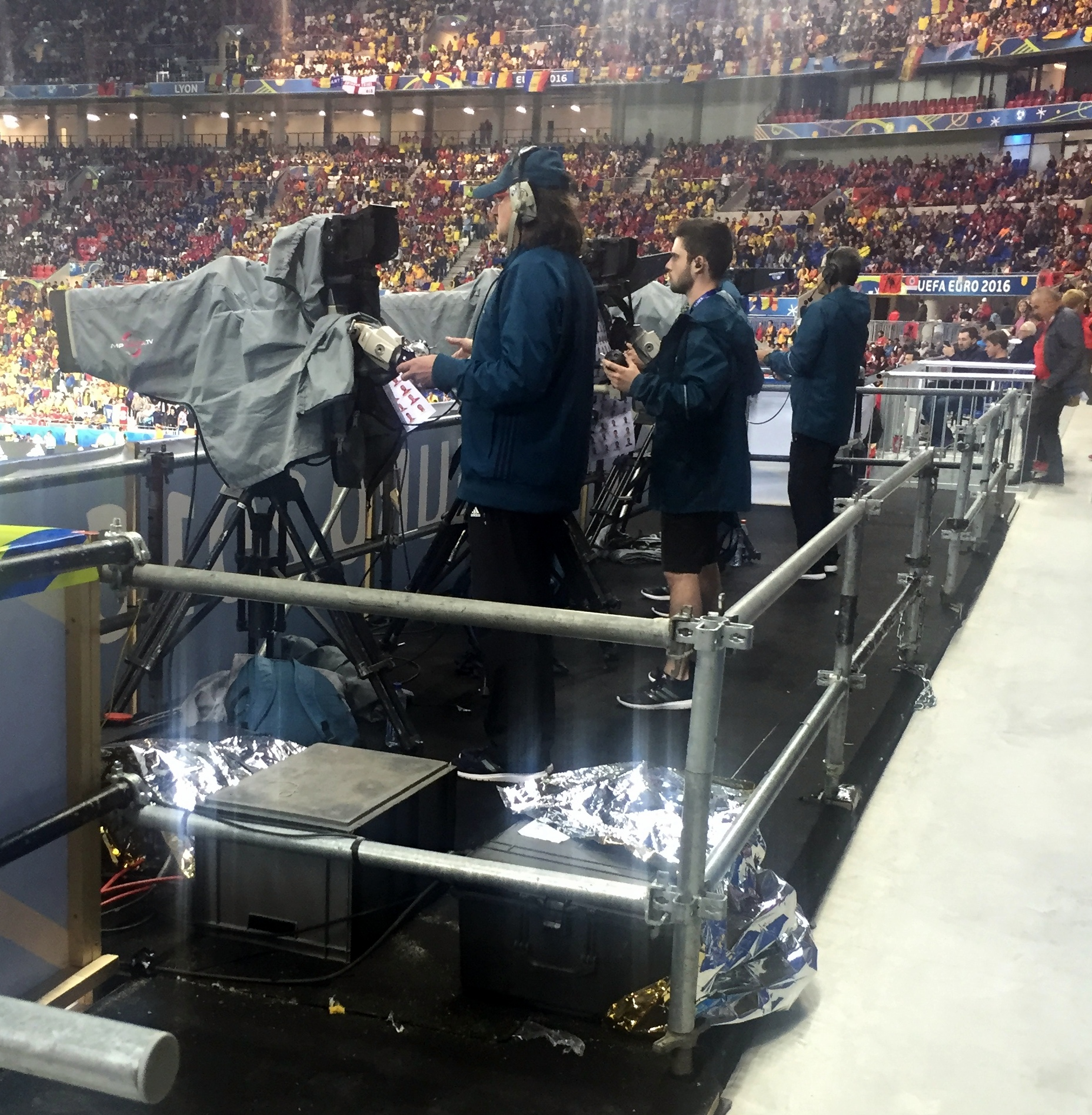
Television cameras filming Romania versus Albania.

UEFA Euro 2016 was a football tournament that took place in June and July 2016 involving 24 men's national teams from nations affiliated to the Union of European Football Associations (UEFA). The tournament was broadcast via television and radio all over the world, with the rights divided between various nations and wider territories (e.g. Sub-Saharan Africa and the Caribbean nations).

In addition, IMG secured the in-flight and on-ship broadcasting rights.

== Television ==
=== UEFA ===
Territory	Rights holder	Ref
Albania	Top Channel; SuperSport	
Armenia	AMPTV	
Austria	ORF; ATV	
Azerbaijan	İTV; Alma Sport	
Belarus	BTRC	
Belgium	VRT; RTBF	
Bosnia and Herzegovina	BHRT	
Bulgaria	BNT; Nova TV	
Croatia	HRT	
Cyprus	CyBC	
Czech Republic	Czech Television	
Denmark	DR; TV 2	
Estonia	ERR	
Finland	Yle	
France	TF1; M6; BeIN Sports	
Georgia	GPB	
Germany	ARD; ZDF; ProSiebenSat.1	
Greece	ERT	
Hungary	MTVA	
Iceland	RÚV; Sjónvarp Símans	
Ireland	RTÉ; TV3	
Israel	Charlton	
Italy	RAI; Sky Sport	
Kazakhstan	Kaztrk	
Kosovo	RTK; SuperSport	
Latvia	LTV	
Lithuania	LRT	
Macedonia	MKRTV	
Malta	PBS	
Moldova	TRM	
Montenegro	RTCG	
Netherlands	NOS	
Norway	NRK; TV 2	
Poland	TVP; Polsat	
Portugal	RTP; SportTV	
Romania	Pro TV; Dolce Sport	
Russia	Pervyi Kanal; VGTRK; Match TV	
Serbia	RTS	
Slovakia	RTVS	
Slovenia	RTVSLO	
Spain	Mediaset España	
Sweden	SVT; TV4	
Switzerland	SRG SSR	
Turkey	TRT; Digiturk	
Ukraine	Ukrayina	
United Kingdom	BBC; ITV; S4C	

=== Rest of the world ===
Territory	Rights holder	Ref
Africa	Canal+ Afrique	
Angola	TPA; ZAP	
Argentina	Canal 9; Canal de la Ciudad	
Australia	SBS; beIN Sports	
Bangladesh	Channel 9	
Benin	ORTB	
Botswana	BTV	
Brazil	Rede Bandeirantes; Rede Globo; SporTV	
Brunei	Astro	
Burkina Faso	RTB	
Burundi	RTNB	
Cambodia	GMM Grammy; CBS	
Cameroon	CRTV	
Canada	TSN; RDS	
Caribbean	ESPN	
Cape Verde	RTC	
Central Asia	Alma Sport	
Chile	Telecanal	
China	CCTV; Future TV; Mi TV	
Colombia	RCN Televisión	
Costa Rica	Repretel	
Cuba	TV Rebelde	
Democratic Republic of the Congo	RTNC	
Dominican Republic	Antena Latina	
Djibouti	RTD	
East Timor	RTTLep	
Ecuador	RTS; La Tele	
El Salvador	TCS	
Ethiopia	ETV	
Equatorial Guinea	Radio Televisión de Guinea Ecuatorial	
Fiji	Mai TV	
Gabon	RTG	
Gambia	GTRS	
Guatemala	Chapin TV	
Guinea	RTG	
Honduras	Televicentro	
Hong Kong	beIN Sports; LeSports; now TV	
Indian subcontinent	Sony SIX; Sony ESPN	
Indonesia	RCTI; Indovision	
Iran	IRIB TV3; IRIB Varzesh	
Ivory Coast	RTI	
Japan	Sportsnavi; TV Asahi; WOWOW	
Kenya	Bamba TV; KTN	
Kyrgyzstan	KTRK	
Laos	GMM Grammy	
Latin America	Televideo Services; DirecTV	
Macau	TDM	
Madagascar	Télévision publiques de Madagascar	
Malawi	MBC	
Malaysia	Astro	
Maldives	MediaNet	
Mali	ORTM	
Mauritania	TV de Mauritanie	
Mauritius	MBC	
Mexico	OTI; TV Azteca; Televisa; Sky Sports	
MENA	beIN Sports	
Mozambique	TVM	
Myanmar	Sky Net	
Namibia	NBC	
New Zealand	Sky Sport	
Nicaragua	Canal 4	
Niger	Office de radiodiffusion télévision du Niger	
Nigeria	AIT; NTA; Galaxy Television	
Pacific Islands	Click TV	
Panama	Corporacion Medcom; TVMax	
Paraguay	Paravisión; SNT; La Tele; Telefuturo	
Peru	ATV	
Philippines	ABS-CBN	
Rwanda	Rwanda TV	
Senegal	RDTV	
Seychelles	SBC	
Sierra Leone	SLBC	
Singapore	Eleven Sports Network	
South Africa	SuperSport; SABC	
South Korea	IB Media Net Inc.	
Sub-Saharan Africa	SuperSport; TV Media Sport	
Suriname	SCCN	
Swaziland	Swazi TV	
Taiwan	Eleven Sports Network	
Tajikistan	Saran Media	
Tanzania	Azam TV	
Thailand	GMM Grammy; Channel 3	
Togo	TVT	
Turkmenistan	Saran Media	
United States	ESPN	
Uruguay	Tenfield	
Uzbekistan	Uzreport TV	
Venezuela	Meridiano Televisión	
Vietnam	VTV	
Zambia	ZNBC	
Zimbabwe	ZBC	

== Radio ==
Territory	Rights holder	Ref
Europe	EBU	
France	Radio France	
Germany	Sport1	
Portugal	RTP	
South Africa	SABC	
United Kingdom	BBC; Talksport	
