= Moving On (Zhang Liyin song) =

Single by Zhang Liyin
- B-side: "Love Me"
- Released: October 29, 2009
- Recorded: 2009
- Studio: SM Studios, Seoul, South Korea
- Genre: Mandopop
- Label: SM; Avex Asia
- Composer(s): Kenzie; Brandon Fraley; Jamelle Fraley; Victor Oquenda; Javier Solis
- Lyricist(s): Zhou Weijie; Huang Zuyin
- Producer(s): Lee Soo Man

Zhang Liyin singles chronology
| "'I Will'" (2008) | "Moving On" (2009) | "'Agape'" (2014) |

"Moving On" is a song recorded by Zhang Liyin. It was released as her second single on October 29, 2009 and in South Korea on October 30, 2009 by SM. The song is a remake of Ana Bárbara's "Deja" (2003) and the B-side "Love Me" is a remake of a song called "Baila".

== Song information ==
Written by Chinese singer, Zhou Weijie, "Moving On" is a bittersweet song that speaks about a couple who has just broken up. The writer reflects on the past, referring to their happy memories as "sunny days" and the days after the breakup as "rainy days". Its melody is based on the original Latin tune, but re-arranged by well-known Korean composer, Kenzie.

Composed by a long list of composers (Brandon Fraley, Jamelle Fraley, Victor Oquenda, Javier Solis), "Love Me" is an upbeat dance track with lyricist written by Huang Zuyin, a famous lyricist who has written songs for Taiwanese groups like Fahrenheit and S.H.E. The song features a rap by Super Junior-M member, Henry.

== Music video ==
The MV was filmed in the late summer of 2009 at a hotel resort in Jeju Island, Korea. It took two days to film the entirety of the music video; one day to film the scenes for the story line, and another to film the stand-in scenes with Zhang singing. The video received a mostly negative response from fans, despite it being Zhang's first starring role since her appearance in "Y (Why...)". Fans criticized it being merely a slideshow, feeling misled by the MV teaser that was released a week before the full MV.

Reflective of the song's lyrics, Zhang stars in the music video alongside Super Junior member, Donghae. Together, they portray a couple who is about the break-up. The video starts off with the "sunny days" of the relationship, gradually leading to display the "rainy days" of the relationship after Donghae announces his departure from the relationship. It ends with a bittersweet scene from Zhang's memory when they were at the beach together.

== Track listing ==
| No. | Title | Translation | Length |
|---|---|---|---|
| 1. | "晴天, 雨天" | Moving On | 3:52 |
| 2. | "愛我" (feat. Henry of Super Junior-M) | Love Me | 3:33 |
| 3. | "晴天, 雨天" (instrumental) | Moving On | 3:50 |
