= Agape (song) =

Single by Zhang Liyin
- B-side: "Back Then"
- Released: August 2, 2014 China; August 6, 2014 South Korea
- Recorded: 2014
- Studio: SM Studios, Seoul, South Korea
- Genre: Pop; R&B
- Length: 10:11
- Label: SM
- Composers: Bardur Haberg; Lena Anderssen; Hu Xia
- Lyricists: Zhang Liyin; Tina Wang; Giddens Ko

Zhang Liyin singles chronology
"Moving On" (2009)	"Agape" (2014)	"Not Alone" (2014)

Agape is a song recorded by Chinese singer Zhang Liyin. It was releases as a digital single on August 2, 2014 in China and August 6 in South Korea. It also marks her first release since Moving On in 2009.

== Background and composition ==
"Agape" dedicated to the victims of the 2008 Sichuan earthquake. Co-written by Zhang Liyin and Taiwanese lyricist Tina Wang, the song is about a mother who allows her child to live at the expense of her own life. The single's B-side track "Back Then" is a cover of the title song from Taiwanese film You Are the Apple of My Eye.

On May 26, 2014, S.M announced that label mate f(x) Victoria will be the main lead for Zhang's music video. Actor Song Jae-rim and EXO member Tao were later confirmed as added to the cast through various Korean news sites on June 18. The music video teaser was released July 25, and the full music video was released August 5. Both were released on the SM Town official YouTube and YinYueTai channel. The song was released August 2, 2014 on Baidu Music for China, and released in South Korea through online music stores MelOn and Genie on August 6, 2014.

== Plot line ==
The music video is a tribute to the victims of the 2008 Sichuan earthquake. The plot is based on a true story of a selfless mother who protected her child throughout the 7.9 magnitude earthquake.

When the mother was discovered by the rescuers, she had already died from the house that collapsed. However, the rescuer noticed her unusual posture, kneeling on the ground with both of her arms supporting her upper body. When people cleared away the rubble around her, they found her 3 to 4-month-old baby, wrapped in a blanket, sleeping soundly under her, still alive. After that, the rescuing doctor found a mobile phone inside the baby's blanket and on the screen was a message that said: "My beloved baby, if you can survive, please remember that I love you."

=== Plot in MV ===
Tao is the son of Victoria, who sacrificed herself to shield him in the earthquake in Sichuan, China and died when he was still young. Tao's father is Korean and was in Korea working at the time of the earthquake. He took Tao to Korea after the earthquake. After Tao grew up in Korea, he worked as a delivery boy. One day after work, he saves a girl (who was also played by Victoria) from a car accident and was surprised to see that she looks exactly like his deceased mom. He started to follow and watch over her because he wants to protect her like his mom once did for him. The current Vic works at McDonald's, and is the daughter of a shop owner in China Town. Tao always watches Victoria from afar. Meanwhile, he often has flashbacks of sweet childhood memories with his mother, which makes him even more miserable. One day, some gangsters are bothering Vic and her mother in her mother's shop. Tao, who sees this in the crowd, steps in to protect them and gets hurt from the fight. Later on, Vic helps fix Tao's wounds, which also reminds Tao of how his mother used to care for him when she was still alive. Tao and Vic become friends, and Tao starts to work at the same fast food chain. Vic starts to develop feelings for Tao, while Tao is confused about his feelings for Vic. He has a mixed feeling of "wanting to get closer to Vic because she looks like his mom" and "liking her because of who she is". One day, Vic visits Tao's house and accidentally sees his family photo while Tao is sleeping. She begins to think that Tao only approached her because she looks like his mom and feels hurt. In the end of the MV, Tao wakes up and Victoria leaves Tao. The story continues in Zhang Liyin's single Not Alone (Zhang Liyin song).

== Track listing ==
No.	Title	Lyrics	Music	Length
1.	"爱的独白" (Agape)	Zhang Liyin, Tina Wang	Bardur Haberg, Lena Anderssen	4:00
2.	"那些年" (Back Then)	Giddens Ko	Hu Xia	6:11

== Chart performance ==
Both songs reached Top 10 on Baidu King Chart in its first weekend. The single started off their first full week with "Agape" at #4, and "Back Then" at #7. The music video ranked #1 in real time on iQIYI on its release, and reached #2 overall for the week of August 4 to August 10. In the same week, the "Agape" music video ranked #6 overall in the most watched K-Pop music videos on YouTube. The single's third week of promotions saw "Agape" rank #5 on the weekly CCTV Global Chinese Music show, and #5 on the Top Chinese Music chart. Billboard listed "Agape" as the #9 most watched K-pop music video in the United States for the month of August.

== Chart ==
"Agape"

Chart	Peak position
Baidu Weekly Music Chart	13
Baidu Monthly Music Chart	-
Baidu King Weekly Chart	6
YinYueTai Monthly Chart	3

"Back Then"

Chart	Peak position
Baidu Weekly Music Chart	-
Baidu Monthly Music Chart	-
Baidu King Weekly Chart	11
