= Skeleton (song) =

- CD+DVD single cover

Single by Super Junior Donghae & Eunhyuk

from the EP Present
- Language: Japanese
- B-side: "Wonderland"
- Released: 6 August 2014
- Recorded: 2014
- Studio: SM Blue Ocean (Seoul); SM Yellow Tail (Seoul)
- Genre: Dance-pop
- Length: 14:54
- Label: Avex Trax
- Composers: Will Simms; Hayley Aitken; Iggy Strange-Dahl
- Lyricists: Shimura Ushiro; Carlos Water Paco

Super Junior Donghae & Eunhyuk singles chronology
"I Wanna Dance" (2013)	"Skeleton" (2014)	"Growing Pains" (2015)

"Skeleton" is the third Japanese single by Super Junior's sub-group, Donghae & Eunhyuk, released on August 6, 2014, by Avex Trax.

== Track listing ==
CD
No.	Title	Length
1.	"Skeleton"	3:24
2.	"Wonderland"	4:03
3.	"Skeleton" (Less Vocal)	3:24
4.	"Wonderland" (Less Vocal)	4:03
Total length:		14:54

DVD

1. "Skeleton" music video
2. "Skeleton" music video making-of

== Chart ==
Oricon Singles Chart, Japan
Chart	Period	Peak position	Reported sales
Daily Singles Chart	6 August 2014	2	28,973
Weekly Singles Chart	4–10 August 2014	4	36,575
Monthly Singles Chart	August 2014	12	39,314

== Sales ==
Japanese Version

Chart	Amount	Ref
Oricon Singles Chart physical sales	39,314+	

== Release history ==
Release history for "Skeleton"
Region	Date	Format	Label
Japan	6 August 2014	CD; DVD	Avex Trax
Various	6 August 2014	Digital download; streaming	Avex Trax
