= Not Alone (Zhang Liyin song) =

Single by Zhang Liyin
- Released: September 20, 2014 China; September 23, 2014 South Korea
- Recorded: 2014
- Studio: SM Studios, Seoul, South Korea
- Genre: Ballad; R&B
- Length: 8:26
- Label: SM
- Composers: Lee Sangjoon; Yun Jae Lee; Ma Tae Jung
- Lyricist: Wang Yinkai
- Producer: Lee Soo Man

Zhang Liyin singles chronology
"'Agape'" (2014)	"Not Alone" (2014)

Not Alone (我一个人) is a song recorded by Chinese singer Zhang Liyin. It was released by SM Entertainment on September 20, 2014 in China and September 22 in South Korea. The song is a remake of 'By Myself' (나 혼자서) from the SBS drama Ja Myung Go which Girls' Generation member Tiffany sang back in 2009.

== Background and release ==
Zhang Liyin had mentioned that the song is a follow-up track and a continuation of the storyline of Agape during her YouTube Interview with Victoria and Tao. In a press release from SM Entertainment on September 18, the song would be released on September 20, 2014 in China through Baidu and then later released in South Korea through Korean music sites MelOn, Genie, Naver and Bugs on September 22.

Zhang held a showcase to support the release of the single, which was held at the Century Theater in Beijing. EXO members Tao and Chen were guests at the said event.

== Track listing ==
No.	Title	Lyrics	Music	Arrangement	Length
1.	"我一个人" (Not Alone)	Wang Yinkai (王音鍇)	Lee Sangjoon	Yun Jae Lee, Ma Tae Jung	4:13
2.	"我一个人" (Not Alone (Instrumental))				4:13

== Plot line ==
The story line of 'Not Alone' is a sequel of 'Agape'. The gangsters continue to bother Victoria. One day, they kidnap her and force her to sign a contract. Her family borrowed money from the gang and they are forcing them to return the money with unreasonably high interest. Tao fights off the gang and saves Vic. However, the police come and mistake Tao for one of the gang members and put him in jail. Vic visits Tao in jail. Tao is still confused about his feelings for Vic. After Tao comes out of jail, he leaves for a while to sort out his feelings. He goes to the places with memories of his parents and sees flashbacks of their love story (the scenes in black and white). His mother took a ferry from China to work in a Chinese restaurant in Korea when she was young. She met Tao’s father when she got off the ferry at the harbor in Incheon when he picked up the piece of paper with the address of her destination and gave back to her. Tao's father was a firefighter, and often visited the Chinese restaurant where Tao's mother worked. They became friends, and they fell in love. One day, Tao's father proposed and later Tao was born. Tao's father died in a fire a few years after his mother's death. After his revisiting the places where his parents' love story took place, Tao finally decides to become a man as brave and responsible as his father. He studies to become a firefighter. Meanwhile, after Tao is gone, Vic also finds herself missing Tao. Tao realizes that even though he may have started to like Vic because she looks like his mother in the beginning, he now truly love Vic for who she is. He finally gained courage to face Vic and gives her flowers, hoping that Vic would give him a chance. In the end, after Tao saves a family from a fire, Vic, who has been worried to him, rushes to hug him.

== Chart ==
"Not Alone"

Chart	Peak position
Baidu Weekly Music Chart	4
Baidu Monthly Music Chart	9
Baidu King Weekly Chart	13
YinYueTai Monthly Chart	6
