= Future TV Co. Ltd. =

Chinese internet TV company

Future TV Co., Ltd.
- Industry: Internet TV
- Founded: 2011 (Tianjin)
- Headquarters: Tianjin, People's Republic of China
- Products: iCNTV
- Parent: China Network Television
- Website: http://www.icntv.tv/

Future TV Co. Ltd. is a subsidiary of China Network Television (CNTV), the official online division of Chinese national public broadcaster China Central Television (CCTV). It focuses on the expansion of Internet TV business and runs a national Internet TV platform—China Internet TV (iCNTV), which has millions of online users.

iCNTV is the first internet television platform approved by China's State Administration of Radio, Film and Television (SARFT). It is capable of providing 450,000-hour request programs for audiences and has the exclusive Internet TV broadcasting rights for Olympics, the World Cup, etc. in China.

== Foundation ==
In March 2010, CNTV got the first Internet TV license from the State Administration of Radio, Film and Television (SARFT), which regulates the radio, TV and film industries in China. In 2011, SARFT issued rules that said makers of Internet TV equipment can only offer services in partnership with seven licensed content providers, including CNTV. In December 2011, CNTV and Tencent formed a joint venture - Future TV Co Ltd -, to run the Internet TV business. CNTV holds the majority stake in the operation. Tencent, the country's largest Internet company by revenue, thus extends its services for all "four screens"- computers, tablets, mobile phones and televisions. The company also plans to introduce more services, such as entertainment and e-commerce services, to TV sets. Under the strategic partnership pact, Tencent, which has more than 1,200 Internet services and applications, said it would initially put QQ, the most popular instant-messaging tool in China, on TV.

== Cooperation ==
=== Xiaomi ===
State broadcaster China Network Television (CNTV) has formed a partnership with Beijing’s Xiaomi Technology Co., maker of a device that allows people to put streamed Internet video content on their TVs. The deal will allow Xiaomi to stream some of the state broadcaster's popular content on the platform of iCNTV.

=== TCL ===
Chinese television manufacturer TCL Multimedia, internet giant Tencent, and Future Television, the internet TV subsidiary of CCTV's national online TV station CNTV, have partnered to release TCL 3D smart cloud TVs installed with QQ TV 2.0. Future Television will provide the internet TV license used in the partnership.

=== Konka ===
Future TV announced a strategic partnership with Chinese television and consumer electronics manufacturer Konka on September 11, 2012, through which Future TV's HD film and television, sporting event, and educational resources, as well as content offered through partnerships with internet companies like Sina, Sohu, and PPLive (PPTV) will be offered to owners of Konka's X8100-series "dual-channel cloud sync" televisions.

=== LG ===
Future TV has announced a strategic partnership in Beijing to provide content for LG Electronics' multi-screen internet TV services available on LG devices such as TV sets, projectors, and content players. Future Television will also develop HD and 3D content as well as interactive media value-added services, such as photo albums, videoconferencing, TV shopping, and multi-screen interactive services, for LG products.

=== You on Demand ===
You on Demand has signed a distribution deal with China Network Television's subsidiary, Future TV Co. Ltd. The signing with Future TV represents an expansion of YOU On Demand's services from cable to the internet television platform.

=== PPTV ===
In February, 2012, Future TV announced a strategic partnership with PPTV, a leading P2P application which occupies a large market share for live broadcasting of online videos. This partnership enables Future TV to integrate PPTV's content into its Internet TV platform.

=== iQIYI ===
As a leading independent online video company founded by Baidu, Inc. (NASDAQ: BIDU), the world's largest Chinese search engine and Providence Equity Partners in January 2010, iQIYI is China’s first online video platform that focuses on fully licensed and high-definition content. It cooperates with Future TV by providing content to iCNTV.

Future TV has established partnership with many large content providers in China, including Sino-Media International, the Galloping House and Sun Shine, etc. The year of 2013 also witnesses its expansion in global cooperation.

== See also ==
- Internet TV
- Tencent
- Xiaomi
- CNTV
- CCTV
