= I Will (Zhang Liyin album) =

星愿 (I Will)

Studio album by Zhang Liyin
- Released: March 3, 2008
- Recorded: 2005–2007
- Studio: SM Studios, Seoul, South Korea
- Genre: Pop; R&B
- Language: Chinese, Korean
- Label: S.M. Entertainment; Avex Asia
- Producer: Lee Soo Man

Zhang Liyin chronology
"Timeless" (2006)	星愿 (I Will) (2008)	"Moving On" (2009)

Singles from 星愿 (I Will)
- 1. "Timeless" Released: September 8, 2006; 2. "星愿 (I Will)" Released: February 27, 2008; 3. "幸福的左岸" Released: February 27, 2008; 4. "相信爱" Released: November 2008

"星愿 (I Will)" is the debut studio album by Chinese singer Zhang Liyin, better known among English-speakers as simply "I WILL". It was released in various regions of China on March 3, 2008, and released in South Korea on March 12, 2008, which included two bonus Korean tracks. The Asian Special Edition (CD+DVD) of the album was released on March 28, 2008, in Taiwan. Two music videos of the same storyline were released on February 27, 2008, to complement the album release.

== Overview ==
After a two-year hiatus since Zhang's debut single, "Timeless" in 2006, S.M. Entertainment released a Chinese album for Zhang rather than a Korean album, even though her first single was released in Korean. Originally thought to be released in 2007, SM Entertainment pushed back the production of the album because of Zhang's studies. In January 2008, Zhang announced that the expected release for her new album is in February, but due to album packaging conflicts, the album release was again pushed to an early March 2008 release date. An album showcase was held on February 27, 2008, in Beijing.

Following her first two singles of the album, "Timeless" and "Y (Why...)", most of the songs on the album were ballads. The album contained three duets: The Chinese version of her first single, "Timeless", featuring Xiah of TVXQ; "交错的爱", featuring Jonghyun, her company junior before he was included in SHINee; and "纯真的爱", a R&B ballad featuring Song Bingyang, her childhood friend.

Besides ballads, the album also contained three upbeat songs. "A Flame For You" is the theme song for CCTV's drama Ding Jia You Nu Xi Yang Yang which happens to star Zhang's company senior, Kangta. Composed by well-known SM Entertainment composer, Yoo Young Jin, and with lyrics co-written by Zhang Li Yin, "One More Try" is a R&B dance song dedicated to the 2008 Beijing Olympics. "後" is a song with hard beats that most closely depicts Zhang Li Yin's preferred R&B style.

== Chart performance ==
I Will received notable success in China. In mid-July, it was reported that it had sold over 268,000 in the first half of 2008. In Korea, the album debuted with moderate success at #22 on Korea's MIAK Monthly Album Chart of March, selling over 2,000 copies in Korea that month, despite a lack of promotion. The album's first single, "I Will" debuted as #16 on Guangzhou Music Charts and moved up ten spots to #6 after two weeks of release. The second single, "The Left Shore of Happiness" moved up ten spots to #7. The same single peaked at #1 on Korea's Melon Music Chart for two full weeks.

However, the single did not receive national success until one month after its original release. During the second week of April 2008, "I Will" peaked at #1 on China's Largest Online Music Ranking (中國某大型網站音樂排行榜) - a ranking that considers weekly chart statistics from Guangdong Radio, Shandong Radio, Hunan Radio and 30 other domestic radio rankings, along with Internet voting and album sales. After Zhang's performance of "I Will" at the Mengniu Music Chart Awards, the song went up seven places. While in Taiwan, the record received equally good results; peaking in a mid-top 10 position on Five Music and G-Music rankings.

== Music videos ==
Zhang released two music videos with a single storyline. The music videos feature the same cast from Zhang's "Timeless" music video, Super Junior members Han Geng and Siwon, and Lee Yeonhee. The first music video, "I Will", introduces the story of three childhood friends that are trained together in Beijing opera. The music video of "I Will" ends with a cliff hanger, which the story continues and ends in the second music video, "幸福的左岸." The Asia Special Edition of the album also contained two "Timeless" music videos from her first single, but instead of the single's Korean version in the video, Zhang and Xiah Junsu are heard singing its Chinese version.

== Track listing ==
=== Chinese Version ===
CD
No.	Title	Lyrics	Music	Arrangement	Length
1.	"Intro (初恋)" (feat. Han Geng (Intro (First Love)))	Han Geng	Yoo Young-jin		0:43
2.	"初恋" (First Love)	Seemingly Blue	Ding Doudou, Yoo Young-jin		4:11
3.	"A Flame for You"	Luciar	Dane Anthony de Viller, Sean Syed Hosein, Russell Consein		3:22
4.	"星愿 (I Will)" (Star Wish)	Li Zhengxiang	Kim Sung-su, Yoo Young-jin, Yoo Han-jin	Star Wish (I Will)	4:40
5.	"幸福的左岸" (The Left Shore of Happiness)	Seemingly Blue	Ding Doudou, Hong Suk		4:47
6.	"后" (After)	Luciar	Lee Jae Myung		3:22
7.	"交错的爱" (feat. Kim Jonghyun (Wrongly Given Love))	Qi Cheng	Jo Yong-hoon		4:46
8.	"相信爱" (Believe in Love)	Luciar	Jennifer Hamady, Shedric Mitchell, Cho Yong-hun		4:00
9.	"纯真的爱" (feat. Song Bingyang (Perfect Love))	Li Zhengxiang	Droxx (Xperimental Music Korea), Lee Jae-Myung		4:16
10.	"One More Try"	Li Zhengxiang, Zhang Liyin	Yoo Young-jin		4:08
11.	"Y (Why...)"	Rui Ye	Brandon Fraley, Javier Solis		4:03
12.	"Timeless" (feat. Xiah)	Rui Ye	Anders Bagge, Karen Poole, Peer Åström, Henrik Norberg, Oscar Merner, Kenzie		4:09

=== Korean Version ===
CD
No.	Title	Lyrics	Music	Arrangement	Length
1.	"Intro (初恋)" (feat. Han Geng) (Intro (First Love))	Han Geng	Yoo Young-jin	Yoo Han-jin	0:43
2.	"初恋 (First Love)"	Yoo Young-jin	Ding Doudou, Yoo Young-jin		4:11
3.	"A Flame for You"	Luciar	Dane Anthony de Viller, Sean Syed Hosein, Russell Consein		3:22
4.	"星愿 (I Will)" (Star Wish)	Yoo Young-jin	Kim Sung-su, Yoo Young-jin, Yoo Han-jin	Star Wish (I Will)	4:40
5.	"幸福的左岸 (Lovers)" (The Left Shore of Happiness)	Seemingly Blue	Ding Doudou, Hong Suk		4:47
6.	"後 (After)"	Luciar	Lee Jae Myung		3:22
7.	"交错的爱 (An Amorous Song)" (feat. Kim Jonghyun) (Wrongly Given Love)	Qi Cheng	Jo Yong-hoon		4:46
8.	"相信爱 (Believe in Love)"	Luciar	Jennifer Hamady, Shedric Mitchell, Cho Yong-hun		4:00
9.	"纯真的爱 (Perfect Love)" (feat. Song Bingyang)	Li Zhengxiang	Droxx (Xperimental Music Korea), Lee Jae-Myung		4:16
10.	"One More Try"	Li Zhengxiang, Zhang Liyin	Yoo Young-jin		4:08
11.	"Y (Why...)"	Rui Ye	Brandon Fraley, Javier Solis		4:03
12.	"Timeless" (feat. Xiah)	Kenzie	Anders Bagge; Karen Poole; Peer Åström; Henrik Norberg; Oscar Merner; Kenzie	Kenzie	4:09
13.	"성원 (I Will)"	Groovie K; Yoo Young-jin	Groovie K; Yoo Young-jin; Yoo Han-jin	Yoo Han-jin; Yoo Young-jin	4:40
14.	"연인이여 (Lovers)"	Kwon Yun-jung	Ding Doudou, Hong Suk		4:40

=== Asian Special Version ===
CD
No.	Title	Lyrics	Music	Arrangement	Length
1.	"Intro (初戀)" (feat. Han Geng) (Intro (First Love))	Han Geng	Yoo Young-jin		0:43
2.	"初戀" (First Love)	Seemingly Blue	Ding Doudou, Yoo Young-jin		4:11
3.	"A Flame for You"	Luciar	Dane Anthony de Viller, Sean Syed Hosein, Russell Consein		3:22
4.	"星願 (I Will)" (Star Wish)	Li Zhengxiang	Kim Sung-su, Yoo Young-jin, Yoo Han-jin	Star Wish (I Will)	4:40
5.	"幸福的左岸" (The Left Shore of Happiness)	Seemingly Blue	Ding Doudou, Hong Suk		4:47
6.	"後" (After)	Luciar	Lee Jae Myung		3:22
7.	"交錯的愛" (feat. Kim Jonghyun) (Wrongly Given Love)	Qi Cheng	Jo Yong-hoon		4:46
8.	"相信愛" (Believe in Love)	Luciar	Jennifer Hamady, Shedric Mitchell, Cho Yong-hun		4:00
9.	"純真的愛" (feat. Song Bingyang) (Perfect Love)	Li Zhengxiang	Droxx (Xperimental Music Korea), Lee Jae-Myung		4:16
10.	"One More Try"	Li Zhengxiang, Zhang Liyin	Yoo Young-jin		4:08
11.	"Y (Why...)"	Rui Ye	Brandon Fraley, Javier Solis		4:03
12.	"Timeless" (feat. Xiah)	Rui Ye	Anders Bagge, Karen Poole, Peer Åström, Henrik Norberg, Oscar Merner, Kenzie		4:09

DVD
No.	Title	Length
1.	""星願 (I Will)" Music Video" (with Chinese subtitles)
2.	""幸福的左岸" Music Video" (with Chinese subtitles)
3.	""Timeless" Music Video (Part 1)" (with Chinese subtitles)
4.	""Timeless" Music Video (Part 2)" (with Chinese subtitles)

== Charts ==
=== Mainland China ===
Chart	Single title	Debut position	Peak position	Chart run
China Top Music	星愿 (I Will)	44	11	5
MTV China	星愿 (I Will)	14	20	2
MTV China	幸福的左岸	6	6	5

=== Taiwan ===
Chart	Single title	Debut position	Peak position	Chart run
Channel [V]	星愿 (I Will)	19	13	3
Channel [V]	幸福的左岸	18	10	4
Hit FM	星愿 (I Will)	7	7	2
UFO Radio	星愿 (I Will)	10	9	3
UFO Radio	幸福的左岸	11	11	2

== Release history ==
Region	Release date	Distributing label
China	March 3, 2008	S.M. Entertainment
South Korea	March 12, 2008	KMP Holdings
Hong Kong	March 14, 2008	Avex Asia
Taiwan	March 28, 2008	Avex Taiwan
