= Zhang Liyin =

Chinese singer

- 张力尹
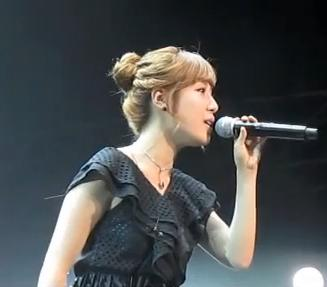
- Zhang in 2010
- Born: February 28, 1989 (age 37); Chengdu, Sichuan, China
- Occupations: Singer; lyricist
- Years active: 2006–present
- Musical career
- Genres: Mandopop; K-pop; R&B; Ballad
- Instrument: Vocals
- Labels: SM; Show City Times; Beijing S.W. Culture Media iFlytek Music
- Formerly of: SM The Ballad, SM Town

Chinese name
- Traditional Chinese: 張力尹
- Simplified Chinese: 张力尹
- Hanyu Pinyin: Zhāng Lìyǐn
Transcriptions
Standard Mandarin
- Hanyu Pinyin: Zhāng Lìyǐn
- Bopomofo: ㄓㄤ˙ㄌㄧ˙ㄧㄣ˙
- Wade–Giles: Chang Li-yin
- Tongyong Pinyin: Jhāng Lìyǐn

Korean name
- Hangul: 장리인
Transcriptions
- Revised Romanization: Jang Riin
- McCune–Reischauer: Chang Riin

Zhang Liyin (born February 28, 1989) is a Chinese singer and songwriter. She has released singles in both China and South Korea, singing in both languages. Zhang became the first Chinese female to debut in South Korea with the release of her single "Timeless" in 2006, which later reached number one on music charts. She is also the first foreign artist to win Best Newcomer award at the Mnet Asian Music Awards.

== Early life ==
Zhang was born in Chengdu, Sichuan, China. Her parents took her to their classical concerts and exposed her to a variety of music. At the age of three, she began to learn the violin. Zhang was so interested in classical, American, and European pop music that she claims she never sang children's songs when she was a child. She also developed the ability to sing a song after hearing it only once. When she was nine years old, she showed her musical ability when she sang Celine Dion's "My Heart Will Go On".

As she grew older, Zhang became more absorbed into pop music than classical music. She secretly listened to pop music because her parents were against it. When she was twelve, she was accepted into a middle school affiliated to Sichuan Conservatory of Music after scoring the highest with her violin talents, but she opted to become a singer instead. Eventually, her parents began to support her dream to become a singer and she gained confidence when she was selected as the top 10 adult singers in a national singing competition under a sponsorship in Shanghai, China.

Zhang was discovered by Korean entertainment company DR Music in 2002 while attending a Baby V.O.X. concert in China, and signed an eight-year contract with the company to last until May 2011. The next year, she moved to South Korea and started training at the age of fourteen. In August 2003, Zhang's mother requested DR Music to terminate Zhang's contract so Zhang could focus on her studies, but in the same month, Zhang signed a contract with S.M. Entertainment. On June 18, 2007, DR Music filed a lawsuit against Zhang and S.M. Entertainment to get 200 million South Korean won for compensation for her exclusive contract with them.

== Career ==
=== 2006–2007: Debut with Timeless and commercial success ===
In August 2006, SM announced that Zhang would officially have her broadcast debut with a performance of her debut single "Timeless" featuring Xia Junsu on MBC's Music Core the next month. Prior to the official release of her single, "Timeless" was available for free download starting on August 31 in five Asian countries. Her debut single, "Timeless", was released on September 8. It is an R&B song which is a Korean version of the original single by Kelly Clarkson and Justin Guarini. The music video was a two-part installment, starring Lee Yeon-hee and Super Junior members Han Geng and Siwon. The music video ranked No. 1 on Melon's Video Chart for four full weeks. Within ten days of debuting, Zhang entered the "Take 7" chart on SBS's Inkigayo.

Zhang continued to promote the B-side track from her debut single, "Y (Why...)," in December 2006. SM also released a "Timeless" documentary version of her "Y (Why...)" music video. This music video reveals her hardships during training; it also showed many behind the scenes clips of her promotion of "Timeless", including never-before-seen footage of her with Xiah. However, promotions for "Y (Why...)" ended quickly, and SM announced that she would be on hiatus from the music industry throughout the rest of the year to prepare for her major debut in China in the end of the year. Zhang made a surprising guest appearance at TVXQ's second Asia tour concert in Seoul, South Korea on February 23, 2007. She performed "TRI-ANGLE" with TVXQ, singing a part in the song that was previously performed by BoA. She made a second appearance with TVXQ on November 24, 2007, in Malaysia for the same concert, and was TVXQ's regular guest star for their "O" Asia tour until its finale in June 2008.

=== 2008: I Will ===
Zhang's first Mandarin album, I Will was originally announced to be released in late 2007, but the release date was pushed to early March 2008. The album was finally released in different regions of China starting March 3, 2008, and on March 28, 2008, I Will made its Asia-wide release. Before the release of the album, two music videos were released on February 27, 2008, to promote the album. Similar to "Timeless", the two music videos "I Will" and "The Left Shore of Happiness", are one story but separated to two parts. Han Geng, Siwon, and Lee Yeon-hee are also the cast for those two music videos.

After the album's release, Zhang received praise from various industry professionals. Golden Melody Award-winning Taiwanese American singer-songwriter Leehom Wang complimented Zhang's singing and was surprised to hear such a strong voice coming from only a nineteen-year-old. During a radio broadcast, Hong Kong-based singer-songwriter, Hins Cheung compared her "soulful" vocals to well-known R&B vocalists such as Whitney Houston, Leona Lewis and Christina Aguilera. He was impressed at the "international-level music" of the release and said he felt there was a lot of "power in this nineteen-year-old."

On May 25, 2008, Zhang received her first award, following the release of her Chinese album, at the 5th Annual Music King Global Chinese Ultimate Song Chart Awards for Female Mainland Newcomer with Most Potential. In her speech, she expressed wishes for more financial support towards the Sichuan earthquake that had devastated her home province two weeks earlier. Throughout the months of May and June, Zhang attended many online interviews and made numerous variety show appearances, as well as a short university tour to raise money for the Sichuan earthquake. A solo fan meeting for Zhang was held on July 5, 2008, in Beijing. Besides performing songs from I Will, she also covered songs from notable R&B female singers Whitney Houston and Christina Aguilera.

On September 13, 2008, fans first heard confirmed news of Zhang's repackage album, which would feature the track "Believe in Love", as well as plans for her second Chinese album. Despite this, the repackage album still has not been released and there has been no other announcements of it being sold in the future.

While Korea's Mnet/MK Music Festival was being held on the same night, Zhang attended the 6th Annual Southeast Music Ranking on November 15, 2008, winning the award for Best Mainland Newcomer. Her win was followed by numerous invitations to other award shows throughout the month of December, including the 2008 Tencent Star Ceremony, BQ 2008 Celebrity Ranking, and the 1st Annual Mengniu New Music Festival.

=== 2009–2013: Moving On, second album recordings and hiatus ===
The beginning of 2009 saw Zhang's Chinese activities come to an end as she started preparations for her second album. Activities for Chinese New Year brought her alongside Super Junior-M to many activities, including her first appearance on China's biggest television broadcaster, CCTV, for the Dance & Music Spring Festival Gala. She was also in Shanghai on January 9 to film for a song collaboration between many popular Chinese pop artists, such as Show Lo, Fish Leong and BoBo.,

On February 6, 2009, Zhang flew to Thailand for the second time in her career to attend the Bangkok concert stop in the SMTown Live '08 tour. For that weekend, her activity schedule was tight as she was required to fly throughout Asia for activities. Less than 10 hours after the end of the Bangkok concert, Zhang flew with members of Super Junior-M to Guangzhou, Guangdong, China to participate in the 8th Annual Future Star Competition, which also featured JJ Lin, Eric Tsang and Dicky Cheung. She returned to South Korea for album preparations on February 9, 2009.

On March 7, 2009, Zhang was the opening act for the last Super Show concert in Chengdu on March 7, 2009, singing "I Will" and "The Left Shore of Happiness".

Aside from a performance at the Descendants of the Dragon concert hosted by Jackie Chan, Zhang was relatively inactive as she remained in South Korea to record her second single.

Finally, a year and a half after the release of her first album, a teaser for her upcoming song, "Moving On" was released on October 15. Four days later, the full music video was released through S.M. Entertainment and Sohu. The music video features Zhang reflecting back on her memories of the fictional relationship between Donghae (of Super Junior) and herself before they break up. Despite fans' general disappointment towards the music video being only a slideshow of photos, it was highly anticipated. On October 23, a week before the single's release across China, a joint press conference was held for both Zhang and Super Junior-M for them to officially announce their new releases to the Chinese media.

After three short months of promotions for "Moving On", Zhang announced on her Cyworld that she would be returning to South Korea on January 24 to prepare for her second Chinese album. Zhang posted on her Sina Weibo account that her album may be released in September or October. Despite this, the album was eventually delayed. During the summer of 2012, Zhang once again announced on her Weibo account that she is busy recording for her new album and it may be released in September or October. Unfortunately, the album release was once again pushed back. In June 2013, labelmate Zhou Mi posted on his official Weibo account hinting that a new album from Zhang may be forthcoming: "Good voices with great potential should not be buried; anticipating Liyin's transformation from a pupa to a butterfly! New album, hurry up and release!"

=== 2014: SM The Ballad, Agape, Not Alone ===
On February 3, it was announced that SM The Ballad would make their comeback in the month after more than 3 years of hiatus, and Zhang would join Shinee's Jonghyun, Super Junior's Yesung, Super Junior-M's Zhou Mi, TVXQ's Changmin, Girls' Generation's Taeyeon, Exo's Chen, and Krystal from f(x) in promoting a new EP called Breath. The eight members released their second EP on February 13, with Zhang performing the Chinese version of "Breath" with Chen. The Chinese version of "Breath" was promoted on various Chinese and Korean music shows including Hunan TV's The Lantern Festival, Arirang's Simply K-Pop, and SBS MTV's The Show.

Through various Korean news sites on May 23, 2014, it was revealed that Zhang would be releasing a new song in the summer. Fellow labelmate, f(x)'s Victoria, was cast as the lead actress. On June 18, news arrived that Zhang's music video filming was underway. SM confirmed with Korean media outlets that two more labelmates, EXO member Tao and actor Song Jae-rim were added to the cast. Zhang's third digital single Agape was released August 2, 2014, on Baidu Music exclusively for the Chinese market, before a wider release on Korean online music stores four days later. Agape was promoted on various Korean TV shows like Arirang's Simply K-Pop, SBS MTV's The Show and Mnet's M! Countdown. Zhang also made an appearance on CCTV Global Chinese Music Chart to promote the song in China.

On August 7, Zhang announced during a live Weibo interview that a new single will be released after promotions for Agape; the song and its music video will be a sequel to "Agape".

On September 20, Zhang released her fourth single Not Alone in China through Baidu and then later released in South Korea through Korean music sites MelOn, Genie, Naver and Bugs on September 22. The single is a remake of Tiffany's "By Myself" from the SBS drama series Ja Myung Go. The song is the continuation of the story line of her previous single Agape. To support the release of her latest single, Zhang had a showcase in Beijing on September 22 with EXO members Chen and Tao with Tasty as special guests. At the showcase, Zhang performed "Agape", "Back Then", "I Will", "Breath", and "Not Alone".

=== 2017–2020: Return to China and new agency ===
On February 28, 2017, on a live Yizhibo broadcast, Zhang revealed that her contract with SM Entertainment will expire in April 2017 and she decided to pursue her career in China. On August 15, Zhang's Weibo profile was updated to indicate that she was now managed by Beijing-based talent agency Show City Times; however, the company did not officially announce her until December 31, 2018, when a Weibo post was shared with her image attached.

While under Show City Times' management, Zhang released three new songs: a duet with singer Henry Huo called "Lonely"; a soundtrack song called "Answer" for the Chinese TV drama, The Remedy; and finally, and a song called "Ashes of Time" that was featured in Tencent Pictures' feature film, Sword and Fire. Despite these releases, Zhang's time with Show City Times was short-lived. On September 15, 2020, it was announced on Weibo that she had signed with Beijing S.W. Culture Media.

In July 2022, It was confirmed through Weibo that Zhang signed with iFlytek Music. On September 26, 2022, Zhang released her Korean single after several years titled "Sense" as part of the +memory project.

=== 2023–present: Return to Korea ===
On October 26, 2023, Zhang competed on the third season of JTBC survival battle Sing Again - Unknown Singer Competition as singer No. 70, its also marks her first appearance on South Korean national television in 15 years. Zhang was later eliminated on the seventh episode.

On December 19, 2023, Zhang released digitally her second studio album The Tide of Life which composed of ten-tracks previously released since 2022 after she signed with iFlytek Music.

On December 29, 2023, Zhang made appearance on Kim Junsu's year-end concert "XIA 2023 CONCERT Chapter 1: Recreation" with performance duet song "Timeless" in 15 years.

On February 16, 2024, Zhang released a duet single with ballad singer Lee Jung-bong titled "How Have You Been?", as a remake of Lee Jung-bong's own song and was released in Korean and Chinese version.

On June 29, 2024, Zhang and Super Junior-M's Zhoumi released a single titled "Don't Go Today" through Easy Entertainment, a remake single of Ben and Lim Sejun's "Don't Go Today" (2016).

== Controversies ==
=== DR Music ===
On June 18, 2007, DR Music filed a lawsuit against Zhang and SM Entertainment to get compensation for ₩200 million from terminating their exclusive contract. Zhang had signed an artist contract with DR Music back in 2002.

=== Visa ===
Like former label mate Han Geng, Zhang held an E-6 (entertainment industry) visa, for foreigners in South Korea. Foreign artists carrying out promotional activities have limitations in terms of location and other factors. Han's visa only allowed him to work under SBS and KBS, while Zhang's allowed her to work only with SBS and MBC, which is why she only performed on the two stages at the time of her debut. On August 1, 2008, the South Korean government's law of restrictions on foreigners were lifted, and foreign entertainers are now allowed to perform in every station in the country. However, Zhang was unable to perform on MBC due to the channel's conflict with S.M. Entertainment. As of late 2008, MBC has removed the ban of S.M. Entertainment's artists on their channel.

== Discography ==
- I Will (2008)
- The Tide of Life (2023)

== Tours ==
=== Appearances ===
- "O": The 2nd Asia Tour (TVXQ) (2007)
- SM Town Summer Concert (2007)
- SM Town Live '08 (2008–2009)
- Super Show (Super Junior) (2009)
- SM Town Live '10 World Tour (2010–2011)
- SHINee World (SHINee) (2011)
- SM Town Live World Tour III (2012–2013)
- SM Town Live World Tour IV (2014–2015)

== Filmography ==
=== Television shows ===
| Year | Network | Title | Role | Notes |
|---|---|---|---|---|
| 2008 | JSBC: Jiangsu Television | Super Star (非常大明星) | Guest | |
| 2008 | HBS: Hunan Television | Yue Ce Yue Kai Xin | Guest | |
| 2008 | GRT: Guangdong Television | Star (最愛主打星) | Guest | |
| 2010 | HBS: Hunan Television | Day Day Up | Guest | |
| 2014 | HBS: Hunan Television | The Lantern Festival | Guest | |
| 2014 | SMG: Dragon Television | Immortal Song (不朽之名曲) | Guest | Episode 4 |
| 2014 | AHBC: Anhui Television | Mad for Music (我为歌狂) | Guest | Episodes 2, 3, 9, 10, 11 |
| 2014 | HBS: Hunan Television | Laugh Out Loud (我们都爱笑) | Guest | |
| 2014 | SZMG: Shenzhen Television | The Generation Show (年代秀) | Guest | |

=== Radio shows ===
| Year | Channel | Date | Title |
|---|---|---|---|
| 2014 | MBC | March 18 | C-Radio Idol True Colours |
| 2014 | MBC | October 11 | C-Radio Idol True Colours |

== Awards ==
| Year | Award | Category | Recipient | Result |
|---|---|---|---|---|
| 2006 | Mnet Asian Music Awards | Best New Artist | "Timeless" | Won |
| 2006 | Cyworld Digital Music Awards | Rookie of the Month (September) | "Timeless" | Won |
| 2006 | M.net KM Music Festival | Best New Female Solo | "Timeless" | Won |
| 2008 | Music King Awards | Female Newcomer with Most Potential | "星愿 (I Will)" | Won |
| 2008 | Fujian Southeast Music Ranking | Best Mainland Newcomer | Zhang Liyin | Won |
| 2008 | Tencent Star Ceremony | Most Popular Female Singer | Zhang Liyin | Won |
| 2008 | Top Chinese Music Awards | Most "Attention Grabbing" Newcomer | Zhang Liyin | Won |
| 2014 | AHTV Mad for Music | Most Popular Female Artist | Zhang Liyin | Won |

Awards and achievements
| Preceded by BoA | M.NET KM Music Festival – Best New Female Group/Artist; 2006 | Succeeded by Wonder Girls |
