= Timeless (Zhang Liyin song) =

Song by Kelly Clarkson and Justin Guarini

from the album Justin Guarini
- Released: June 10, 2003
- Studio: Murlyn Music Group (Stockholm, Sweden); Masterplan Studios (Germany)
- Length: 6:38
- Songwriters: Anders "Bag" Bagge; Peer Åström; Henrik Norberg; Karen Poole; Oscar Merner

"Timeless"

Single by Zhang Liyin

from the album I Will
- B-side: "Y (Why)"
- Released: September 8, 2006
- Recorded: 2006
- Genre: R&B
- Length: 16:36
- Label: SM
- Producers: Lee Soo-man; Kenzie

Zhang Liyin singles chronology
| "Timeless" (2006) | "'I Will'" (2008) |

"Timeless" is a song by American singers Kelly Clarkson and Justin Guarini, originally recorded for the 2003 film From Justin to Kelly. It was included on the track listing of Guarini's self-titled debut album. The song was later recorded by Chinese singer Zhang Liyin featuring Xia Junsu, and released as her debut single on September 8, 2006 in South Korea by SM Entertainment. A Chinese version of the single later released in 2007 in Taiwan. "Timeless" was later included on her debut album I Will (2008). The song has also been covered by Tina Arena and Kane Alexander in 2006.

== Music videos ==
=== Timeless ===
For her debut song "Timeless", Zhang released two music videos with a single storyline. The music videos feature Super Junior members Han Geng and Siwon, as well as Lee Yeonhee. The music videos featured a hostage situation, in which the thief (played by Siwon) holds Lee Yeonhee captive. As the police arrive on the scene, a police officer (Han Geng) attempts to negotiate with Siwon. Siwon shows the hostage and points the gun at her. Han Geng pulls out his gun upon seeing her. Another police officer attempts to kill Siwon, but misses, resulting in Siwon shooting Han Geng. As Siwon makes an escape, he pulls Yeonhee's necklace with him, but he puts it away, uninterested. The story then jumps to a year later, where Han Geng is taken off life support. He is listed as an organ donor. At the same time, Siwon suffers a heart attack. He is given Han Geng's heart and survives. Whilst recovering, Siwon experiences flashbacks of Han Geng and Yeonhee, revealing to the viewers that Han Geng was Yeonhee's boyfriend; however, this confuses Siwon. He recognizes a store from his flashbacks and approaches it, seeing Yeonhee inside. Yeonhee helps him to sit while he experiences some heart pains. While Siwon wonders whether they've met before, he notices a picture of Han Geng and Yeonhee. He then makes the realization that he killed Yeonhee's boyfriend. He then goes through hospital documents and sees that Han Geng donated his heart to him, causing Siwon to realize why he's been getting flashbacks. He goes through his stuff to find Yeonhee's locket, showing a picture of Han Geng and her, after which he breaks down. He then goes to return the necklace. The story ends with Siwon begging for forgiveness on his knees while Yeonhee cries, clutching the necklace.

The actors received high critical praise for their performances. The story was broken down into two main parts. The first part focuses on Siwon's recovery after the surgery, and his realization that he killed Han Geng and has his heart. The second part shows the hostage situation more clearly. Zhang and Xiah are featured in the second part of the music video.

All two music videos was remastered into 4K HD quality on November 16, 2022 and November 23, 2022.

=== Y (Why...) ===
The second music video released was for her second track "Y (Why...)" on her debut single. This song is a remake of Jamelle Fraley's song 'Powerless'. This MV features only her, with straight hair and showcasing a more youthful image than in "Timeless". A second version of this music video features a documentary of her training and backstage scenes of the Timeless promotional activities along with Xiah. Zhang has received a well response from fans as the MV shows her working hard to achieve her dream. This music video also shows clips of her playing the violin and her dancing skills.

== Track listing ==
=== Korean version ===
CD
| No. | Title | Lyrics | Music | Arrangement | Length |
|---|---|---|---|---|---|
| 1. | ""Timeless (feat. Xiah)"" | Kenzie | Anders Bagge; Peer Astrom; Oscar Merner; Karen Poole; Henrik Nordberg; Kenzie | Kenzie | 4:12 |
| 2. | ""Y (Why...)"" | Park Ki-hyun | Javier Solis; Brandon Fraley | Hwang Sung-jae | 4:06 |
| 3. | ""Timeless (Instrumental)"" | | Anders Bagge; Peer Astrom; Oscar Merner; Karen Poole; Henrik Nordberg; Kenzie | Kenzie | 4:12 |
| 4. | ""Y (Why...) [MR]"" | | Javier Solis; Brandon Fraley | Hwang Sung-jae | 4:06 |
| Total length: | | | | | 16:36 |

=== Chinese version ===
CD
| No. | Title | Length |
|---|---|---|
| 1. | ""Timeless (feat. Xiah) (Chinese ver.)"" | 4:11 |
| 2. | ""Y (Why...) (Chinese ver.)"" | 4:05 |
| 3. | ""Timeless (feat. Xiah)"" | 4:12 |
| 4. | ""Y (Why...) "" | 4:06 |
| 5. | ""Timeless (feat. Xiah) (Instrumental)"" | 4:12 |

=== Music program awards ===
| Song | Program | Date |
|---|---|---|
| Timeless | The Music Trend | September 24, 2006 |
| Timeless | Music Bank | September 29, 2006 |
