= 48th Japan Record Awards =

Japanese music awards

- Date: 30 December 2006
- Venue: New National Theatre, Tokyo
- Hosted by: Masaaki Sakai, Yuri Ebihara, Moe Oshikiri

Television/radio coverage
- Network: TBS

The 48th Annual Japan Record Awards took place at the New National Theatre in Shibuya, Tokyo, on 30 December 2006, starting at 6:30PM JST. The primary ceremonies were televised in Japan on TBS.

== Awards and nominations ==
=== Japan Record Award ===
- "Ikken"
  - Singer: Kiyoshi Hikawa
  - Lyricist: Yurio Matsui
  - Composer: Hideo Mizumori
  - Arranger: Makoto Saeki
  - Record label: Columbia Music Entertainment

=== Best Vocal Performance ===
- Kumi Koda

=== Best New Artist ===
- Ayaka

=== New Artist Awards ===
Best New Artist nominations

- Ayaka
- SunSet Swish
- Aki Yamamoto
- WaT

=== Gold Awards ===
Japan Record Award nominations

- Kiyoshi Hikawa – "Ikken"
- BoA – "Winter Love"
- Mihimaru GT – "Kibun Jōjō ￪￪"
- Kobukuro – "Kimi to Iu Na no Tsubasa"
- Kaori Mizumori – "Kumano Kodō"
- W-inds – "Boogie Woogie 66"
- Nakamonomori Band – "Fly High"
- Sukima Switch – "Boku Note"
- Koda Kumi – "Yume no Uta"
- Ai Otsuka – "Ren'ai Shashin"

=== Best Composer ===
- Hiroshi Itsuki – "Takasebune"
  - Singer: Hiroshi Itsuki

=== Best Lyricist ===
- Miyuki Nakajima – "Sorafune
  - Singer: Tokio

=== Best Arranger ===
- Takeshi Kobayashi – "Yubi Kiri"
  - Singer: Yo Hitoto

=== Planning Awards ===
- Hideaki Tokunaga – Vocalist 2
- Mitsuko Nakamura (ja) – Yarōtachi no Uta
- Folk Song Yearbook 1966–1982 Folk & New Music Complete Works
  - King Records, Columbia Music Entertainment, Sony Music Direct, Teichiku Records, EMI Music Japan, Nippon Crown, JVC Kenwood Victor Entertainment, For Life Music Entertainment, Pony Canyon, Yamaha Music Communications, Universal Music Japan
- Yoshida Tadashi Dango Album II
  - Yoshida Tadashi Orchestra, Yoshinao Ōsawa (ja), JVC Kenwood Victor Entertainment

=== Special awards ===
- Toshiko Akiyoshi
- Exile and Koda Kumi – "Won't Be Long"
- Kigurumi – "Tarako Tarako Tarako"
- Ryoko Moriyama and Begin – "Nada Sōsō"
- Masashi Sada – Natsu Nagasaki kara Sada Masashi

=== Achievement Awards ===
- Yū Aku
- Hiroshi Ashino
- Sanechika Andō
- Hiroshi Eguchi
- Rei Nakanishi
- Tadao Hirayama
- Takeharu Yamamoto

=== Special Achievement Awards ===
- Yukio Aoshima
- Shōsuke Ichikawa
- Akira Ifukube
- Hiroshi Uchiyamada
- Setsuo Ohashi
- Masako Kawada
- Teruhiko Kuze
- Tōroku Takagi
- Keiko Matsuyama
- Satoshi Mihara
- Hiroshi Miyagawa

=== Special Honour Award ===
- Toru Funamura

=== Honourable Mention Award ===
Awarded by the Japan Composer's Association

- Miko Takegawa

== See also ==
- 57th NHK Kōhaku Uta Gassen
