= Kiyoshi Hikawa discography =

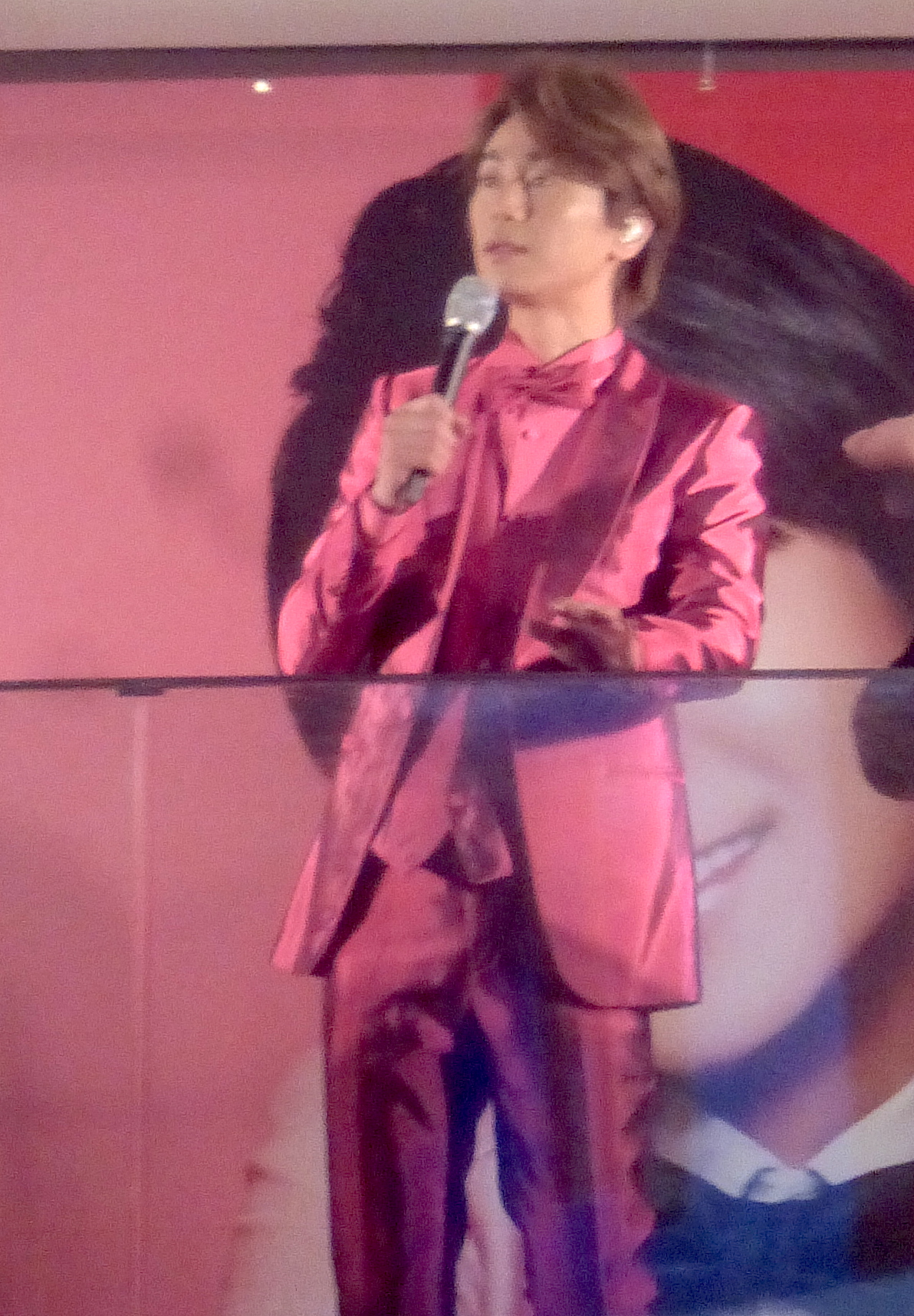
- Hikawa in Shimbashi, 2018
- Studio albums: 39
- EPs: 3
- Compilation albums: 2
- Singles: 42
- Promotional singles: 8
- Video albums: 28

Japanese enka singer Kiyoshi Hikawa has released thirty-nine studio albums, three extended plays (EPs), forty-two singles (including one as a featured artist), eight promotional singles, and twenty-eight video albums. In 2000, Hikawa released "Hakone Hachiri no Hanjirō" (箱根八里の半次郎) as his debut single. This single reached number eleven on the Oricon Weekly Singles Chart and has sold over a million copies nationwide. His second single "Ōi Okkake Otojirō" (大井追っかけ音次郎) reached the top 10 in Japan and attained a double platinum. His tenth single "Hatsukoi Ressha" (初恋列車) was released in 2005 and earned him his first number one hit, later certificated Gold by Recording Industry Association of Japan (RIAJ). With the huge commercial and critical success as an enka singer, Hikawa is often referred as the "Prince of Enka".

He embarked on his career as a pop rock singer with a release of the single "Genkai Toppa x Survivor", which served as a theme song to the anime television series Dragon Ball Super. His first J-pop studio album (thirty-fifth overall), Papillon (Bohemian Rhapsody), was released in June 2020. It includes the single "Genkai Toppa x Survivor" and several promotional singles as well as the cover of "Bohemian Rhapsody" by Queen.

== Albums ==
=== Studio albums ===
List of studio albums, with selected details, chart positions
Title	Details	Peak chart positions	Certifications
Title	Details	JPN	Certifications
Enka Meikyoku Collection Ōi Okkake Otojirō: Seishunhen (演歌名曲コレクション 大井追っかけ音次郎～青春編～)	Release date: June 21, 2001; Label: Nippon Columbia; Format: CD, cassette	6	RIAJ: Gold
Enka Meikyoku Collection 2: Kiyoshi no Zundoko Bushi (演歌名曲コレクション2〜きよしのズンドコ節〜)	Release date: May 22, 2002; Label: Nippon Columbia; Format: CD, cassette	8	RIAJ: Platinum
Ginga: Hoshizora no Akiko (銀河～星空の秋子～)	Release date: November 22, 2002; Label: Nippon Columbia; Format: CD, cassette	6	RIAJ: Gold
Enka Meikyoku Collection 3: Hakkun no Shiro (演歌名曲コレクション3～白雲の城～)	Release date: May 21, 2003; Label: Nippon Columbia; Format: CD, cassette	4	RIAJ: Gold
Otokogi (男気)	Release date: May 21, 2003; Label: Nippon Columbia; Format: CD, cassette	9	RIAJ: Gold
Enka Meikyoku Collection 4 Banba no Chūtarō (演歌名曲コレクション4～番場の忠太郎～)	Release date: September 1, 2004; Label: Nippon Columbia; Format: CD, cassette	5	RIAJ: Gold
Enka Meikyoku Collection 5 Hatsukoi Ressha (演歌名曲コレクション5～初恋列車～)	Release date: May 18, 2005; Label: Nippon Columbia; Format: CD, cassette	2	RIAJ: Gold
Enka Jūniban Shōbu!: Omokoge no Miyako (演歌十二番勝負！～面影の都～)	Release date: November 23, 2005; Label: Nippon Columbia; Format: CD, cassette	5	RIAJ: Gold
Enka Meikyoku Collection 6: Ikken (演歌名曲コレクション6～一剣～)	Release date: June 28, 2006; Label: Nippon Columbia; Format: CD, cassette	5	RIAJ: Gold
Enka Meikyoku Collection 7: Abayo, Kiyoshi no Sōran Bushi (演歌名曲コレクション7～あばよ・きよしのソーラン節～)	Release date: September 19, 2007; Label: Nippon Columbia; Format: CD, cassette	2	RIAJ: Gold
Enka Meikyoku Collection 8: Genkai Funauta (演歌名曲コレクション8～玄海船歌～)	Release date: May 21, 2008; Label: Nippon Columbia; Format: CD, cassette	2	
Enka Meikyoku Collection 9: Aishū no Mizuumi (演歌名曲コレクション9～哀愁の湖～)	Release date: December 10, 2008; Label: Nippon Columbia; Format: CD, cassette	4	
Enka Meikyoku Collection 10: Rōkyōku Ichidai (演歌名曲コレクション10～浪曲一代～)	Release date: May 20, 2009; Label: Nippon Columbia; Format: CD, cassette, CD+DVD	2	
Enka Meikyoku Collection 11: Tokimeki no Rumba (演歌名曲コレクション11～ときめきのルンバ～)	Release date: November 11, 2009; Label: Nippon Columbia; Format: CD, cassette, CD+DVD	2	
Enka Meikyoku Collection 12: Shamisen Tabigarasu (演歌名曲コレクション12～三味線旅がらす～)	Release date: June 23, 2010; Label: Nippon Columbia; Format: CD, cassette, CD+DVD	4	
Enka Meikyoku Collection 13: Niji-iro no Bayon (演歌名曲コレクション13～虹色のバイヨン～)	Release date: November 10, 2010; Label: Nippon Columbia; Format: CD, cassette, CD+DVD	2	
Enka Meikyoku Collection 14: Ano ko to Nogiku to Watashi Bune (演歌名曲コレクション14～あの娘と野菊と渡し舟～)	Release date: June 1, 2011; Label: Nippon Columbia; Format: CD, cassette, CD+DVD	5	
Enka Meikyoku Collection 15: Jōnetsu no Mariachi (演歌名曲コレクション15～情熱のマリアッチ～)	Release date: November 23, 2011; Label: Nippon Columbia; Format: CD, cassette, CD+DVD	5	
Enka Meikyoku Collection 16: Sakura (演歌名曲コレクション16～櫻～)	Release date: June 13, 2012; Label: Nippon Columbia; Format: CD, cassette, CD+DVD	2	
Enka Meikyoku Collection 17: Saigo to Kimeta Hito Dakara (演歌名曲コレクション17～最後と決めた女だから～)	Release date: November 21, 2012; Label: Nippon Columbia; Format: CD, cassette, CD+DVD	6	
Enka Meikyoku Collection 18: Shigure no Minato (演歌名曲コレクション18～しぐれの港～)	Release date: May 29, 2013; Label: Nippon Columbia; Format: CD, cassette, CD+DVD	3	
Enka Meikyoku Collection 19: Manten no Hitomi (演歌名曲コレクション19～満天の瞳～)	Release date: November 20, 2013; Label: Nippon Columbia; Format: CD, cassette, CD+DVD	4	
Hikawa Kiyoshi Shōwa no Enka Meikyokushū (氷川きよしの昭和の演歌名曲集)	Release date: May 21, 2014; Label: Nippon Columbia; Format: CD, cassette, CD+DVD	6	
Enka Meikyoku Collection 20: Choi to Kimagure Wataridori (演歌名曲コレクション20～ちょいと気まぐれ渡り鳥～)	Release date: November 19, 2014; Label: Nippon Columbia; Format: CD, cassette, CD+DVD	3	
Shin Enka Meikyoku Collection: Sasurai Bojō (新・演歌名曲コレクション ～さすらい慕情～)	Release date: July 8, 2015; Label: Nippon Columbia; Format: CD, cassette, CD+DVD	3	
Shin Enka Meikyoku Collection 2: Itoshi no Te Quiero/Otokobana (新・演歌名曲コレクション2～愛しのテキーロ/男花～)	Release date: December 1, 2015; Label: Nippon Columbia; Format: CD, cassette, CD+DVD	3	
Shin Enka Meikyoku Collection 3: Miren Gokoro (新・演歌名曲コレクション3 -みれん心-)	Release date: June 14, 2016; Label: Nippon Columbia; Format: CD, cassette, CD+DVD	5	
Shin Enka Meikyoku Collection 4: Kiyoshi no Nippon Zenkoku Utano Wataridori (新・演歌名曲コレクション4 -きよしの日本全国 歌の渡り鳥-)	Release date: December 14, 2016; Label: Nippon Columbia; Format: CD, cassette, CD+DVD	3	
Shin Enka Meikyoku Collection 5: Otoko no Zekka (新・演歌名曲コレクション5 -男の絶唱-)	Release date: May 30, 2017; Label: Nippon Columbia; Format: CD, cassette, CD+DVD	4	
Shin Enka Meikyoku Collection 6: Aoshi (新・演歌名曲コレクション6 -碧し-)	Release date: November 21, 2017; Label: Nippon Columbia; Format: CD, cassette, CD+DVD	5	
Shin Enka Meikyoku Collection 7: Shōbu no Hanamichi (新・演歌名曲コレクション7 -勝負の花道-)	Release date: May 29, 2018; Label: Nippon Columbia; Format: CD, cassette, CD+DVD	5	
Shin Enka Meikyoku Collection 8: Fuyu no Pegasus Shōbu no Hanamichi: Orchestra (新・演歌名曲コレクション8 -冬のペガサス-勝負の花道～オーケストラ)	Release date: October 2, 2018; Label: Nippon Columbia; Format: CD, cassette, CD+DVD	4	
Shin Enka Meikyoku Collection 9: Daijōbu/Mogami no Sendō (新・演歌名曲コレクション9 -大丈夫/最上の船頭-)	Release date: June 4, 2019; Label: Nippon Columbia; Format: CD, cassette, CD+DVD	5	
Shin Enka Meikyoku Collection 10: Ryūshō Hōbu (新・演歌名曲コレクション10 -龍翔鳳舞-)	Release date: October 22, 2019; Label: Nippon Columbia; Format: CD, cassette, CD+DVD	3	
Papillon (Bohemian Rhapsody) (パピヨン-ボヘミアン・ラプソディ-)	Release date: June 9, 2020; Label: Nippon Columbia; Format: Compact discCD, CD+DVD	2	
Seisei Ruten (生々流転)	Release date: October 13, 2020; Label: Nippon Columbia; Format: CD, CD+DVD	7	
Minamikaze Fukeba (南風吹けば)	Release date: June 8, 2021; Label: Nippon Columbia; Format: CD, CD+DVD	4	
You Are You	Release date: August 24, 2021; Label: Nippon Columbia; Format: CD, CD+DVD	5	
Kiina	Release date: November 19, 2025; Label: Nippon Columbia; Format: CD	21	

=== Karaoke albums ===
List of karaoke albums, with selected details
Title	Details
Hikawa Kiyoshi Jikiden Original Karaoke (氷川きよし直伝 オリジナルカラオケ)	Release date: June 21, 2001; Label: Nippon Columbia; Format: CD, cassette

=== Compilation albums ===
List of compilation albums, with selected details and chart positions
Title	Details	Peak chart positions
Title	Details	JPN
Cover Selection (カバー・セレクション)	Release date: September 6, 2023; Label: Nippon Columbia; Format: CD	27
Kiyoshi Hikawa Theater Theme Song Collection (氷川きよし 劇場主題歌集)	Release date: January 28, 2026; Label: Nippon Columbia; Format: CD	46

=== Box sets ===
List of box sets, with selected details and chart positions
Title	Details	Peak chart positions
Title	Details	JPN
Tabi Uta Special Box (旅うたスペシャルBOX)	Release date: December 12, 2021; Label: Nippon Columbiax; Format: CD	43

== Extended plays ==
List of extended plays, with selected details and chart positions
Title	Details	Peak chart positions
Title	Details	JPN
Matatabi Enka Meikyokusen (股旅演歌名曲選)	Release date: June 21, 2000; Label: Nippon Columbia; Format: CD, cassette	—
Matatabi Enka Meikyokusen II / Hakone Hachiri no Hanjirō (股旅演歌名曲選II / 箱根八里の半次郎)	Release date: October 21, 2000; Label: Nippon Columbia; Format: CD, cassette	68
Ōi Okkake Otojirō (大井追っかけ音次郎)	Release date: November 21, 2001; Label: Nippon Columbia; Format: CD, cassette	30

== Singles ==
=== As a lead artist ===
Title	Year	Peak chart position	Certifications	Album
Title	Year	JPN	Certifications	Album
"Hakone Hachiri no Hanjirō" (箱根八里の半次郎)	2000	11	RIAJ: 3× Platinum	Matatabi Enka Meikyokusen
"Ōi Okkake Otojirō" (大井追っかけ音次郎)	2001	8	RIAJ: 2× Platinum	Enka Meikyoku Collection Ōi Okkake Otojirō: Seishunhen
"Kiyoshi Kono Yoru" (きよしこの夜)	2001	14		Non-album single
"Kiyoshi no Zundoko Bushi" (きよしのズンドコ節)	2002	5	RIAJ: Gold	Enka Meikyoku Collection 2: Kiyoshi no Zundoko Bushi
"Hoshizora no Akiko" (星空の秋子)	2002	3	RIAJ: Gold	Ginga: Hoshizora no Akiko
"Hakkun no Shiro" (白雲の城)	2003	3	RIAJ: Platinum	Enka Meikyoku Collection 3: Hakkun no Shiro
"Lovely" (ラブリィ) (with Tamao Nakamura)	2003	5		Non-album single
"Kiyoshi no Dodonpa" (きよしのドドンパ)	2004	4	RIAJ: Gold	Enka Meikyoku Collection 4 Banba no Chūtarō
"Banba no Chūtarō" (番場の忠太郎)	2004	2	RIAJ: Gold	Enka Meikyoku Collection 4 Banba no Chūtarō
"Hatsukoi Ressha" (初恋列車)	2005	1	RIAJ: Gold	Enka Meikyoku Collection 5 Hatsukoi Ressha
"Omokoge no Miyako" (面影の都)	2005	2	RIAJ: Gold	Enka Jūniban Shōbu!: Omokoge no Miyako
"Ikken" (一剣)	2006	2	RIAJ: Gold	Enka Meikyoku Collection 6: Ikken
"Mirai" (未来)	2006	8 (Note: Charted on the DVD chart.)		Non-album single
"Kiyoshi no Sōran Bushi" (きよしのソーラン節)	2007	3	RIAJ: Gold	Enka Meikyoku Collection 7: Abayo, Kiyoshi no Sōran Bushi
"Abayo" (あばよ)	2007	2	RIAJ: Gold	Enka Meikyoku Collection 7: Abayo, Kiyoshi no Sōran Bushi
"Genkai Funauta" (玄海船歌)	2008	2	RIAJ: Gold	Enka Meikyoku Collection 8: Genkai Funauta
"Aishū no Mizuumi" (哀愁の湖)	2008	4	RIAJ: Gold	Enka Meikyoku Collection 9: Aishū no Mizuumi
"Rōkyōku Ichidai" (浪曲一代)	2009	1	RIAJ: Gold	Enka Meikyoku Collection 10: Rōkyōku Ichidai
"Tokimeki no Rumba" (ときめきのルンバ)	2009	1	RIAJ: Gold	Enka Meikyoku Collection 11: Tokimeki no Rumba
"Shamisen Tabigarasu" (三味線旅がらす)	2010	2	RIAJ: Gold	Enka Meikyoku Collection 12: Shamisen Tabigarasu
"Niji-iro no Bayon" (虹色のバイヨン)	2010	3	RIAJ: Gold	Enka Meikyoku Collection 13: Niji-iro no Bayon
"Ano Ko to Nogiku to Watashi Bune" (あの娘と野菊と渡し舟)	2011	3	RIAJ: Gold	Enka Meikyoku Collection 14: Ano ko to Nogiku to Watashi Bune
"Jōnetsu no Mariachi" (情熱のマリアッチ)	2011	2		Enka Meikyoku Collection 15: Jōnetsu no Mariachi
"Sakura" (櫻)	2012	2	RIAJ: Gold	Enka Meikyoku Collection 16: Sakura
"Saigo to Kimeta Hito Dakara" (最後と決めた女だから)	2012	2		Enka Meikyoku Collection 17: Saigo to Kimeta Hito Dakara
"Shigure no Minato" (しぐれの港)	2013	2		Enka Meikyoku Collection 18: Shigure no Minato
"Manten no Hitomi" (しぐれの港)	2013	4		Enka Meikyoku Collection 19: Manten no Hitomi
"Ohtone Nagarezuki" (大利根ながれ月)	2014	2	RIAJ: Gold	Enka Meikyoku Collection 20: Choi to Kimagure Wataridori
"Choi to Kimagure Wataridori" (ちょいときまぐれ渡り鳥)	2014	3	RIAJ: Gold	Enka Meikyoku Collection 20: Choi to Kimagure Wataridori
"Sasurai Bojō" (さすらい慕情)	2014	8		Shin Enka Meikyoku Collection: Sasurai Bojō
"Itoshi no Te Quiero" (愛しのテキーロ)	2014	2		Shin Enka Meikyoku Collection 2: Itoshi no Te Quiero/Otokobana
"Otokobana" (男花)	2014	2		Shin Enka Meikyoku Collection 2: Itoshi no Te Quiero/Otokobana
"Miren Gokoro" (みれん心)	2016	2	RIAJ: Gold	Shin Enka Meikyoku Collection 3: Miren Gokoro
"Otoko no Zekka" (男の絶唱)	2017	2	RIAJ: Gold	Shin Enka Meikyoku Collection 5: Otoko no Zekka
"Aoshi" (碧し)	2017	—		Shin Enka Meikyoku Collection 6: Aoshi
"Genkai Toppa x Survivor" (限界突破×サバイバー)	2017	3		Papillon -Bohemian Rhapsody-
"Shōbu no Hanamichi" (勝負の花道)	2018	4	RIAJ: Gold	Shin Enka Meikyoku Collection 7: Shōbu no Hanamichi
"GeGeGe no Kitarō" (ゲゲゲの鬼太郎)	2018	21		Non-album single
"Daijōbu" (大丈夫)	2019	3	RIAJ: Gold	Shin Enka Meikyoku Collection 9: Daijōbu/Mogami no Sendō
"Mogami no Sendō" (最上の船頭)	2019	3	RIAJ: Gold	Shin Enka Meikyoku Collection 9: Daijōbu/Mogami no Sendō
"Haha" (母)	2020	2		Seisei Ruten
"Minamikaze" (南風)	2021	2		Minamikaze Fukeba
"Happy!"	2021	4		TBA
"Mori wo Nukete" (森を抜けて)	2021	4		TBA
"Gunjō no Ito" (群青の弦)	2022	1		TBA
"Hodoyoi Zake" (ほど酔い酒)	2026	9		TBA

=== As a featured artist ===
Title	Year	Peak chart position	Album
Title	Year	JPN	Album
"Evergreen: Inochi no Utagoe" (evergreen -いのちの唄声-) (As a member of Cross Clover)	2004	5	Non-album single

=== Promotional singles ===
Title	Year	Album
"Ojiichan-chi e Ikou" (おじいちゃんちへいこう)	2016	Non-album singles
"Kiyoshi no Chiki Chiki Oha Song" (きよしのチキチキOHAソング) (with Kokekko Gumi)	2017	Non-album singles
"Seiya no Kiseki" (聖夜の奇跡)	2019	Non-album singles
"Omoide no Kakera" (オモイデノカケラ)	2019	Non-album singles
"Silent Night"	2019	Non-album singles
"Kimi ni Aitai Xmas" (君に逢いたいXmas)	2019	Non-album singles
"Kakushin" (確信)	2019	Papillon -Bohemian Rhapsody-
"Hug"	2019	Seisei Ruten
"Papillon"	2020	Papillon -Bohemian Rhapsody-
"Omohizora"	2020	Papillon -Bohemian Rhapsody-
"Bohemian Rhapsody"	2020	Papillon -Bohemian Rhapsody-
"Kinishinai"	2020	Papillon -Bohemian Rhapsody-
"Shiroi Shoudou"	2020	Seisei Ruten
"Koi, Moyuru."	2020	Seisei Ruten
"Sokomade Haru ga..."	2021	Minamikaze Fukeba
"Hoshizora no Memories"	2021	Minamikaze Fukeba
