= Kigurumi (disambiguation) =

Kigurumi is a type of Japanese masked cosplay.

It may also refer to:

- Kigurumi (band), Japanese music group
- Kigurumi, a type of Japanese onesie
