= Leena (model) =

Chinese-born Japanese fashion model

- Born: Chen-yi Lee (or Li); March 14, 1990 (age 36); Tai'an, Shandong, People's Republic of China
- Occupation: Fashion model
- Modeling information
- Height: 1.70 m (5 ft 7 in)

Chen-yi Lee (or Li, Chinese: 李建伊, born March 14, 1990), better known as Leena (梨衣名, Riina), is a Japanese fashion model best known for her regular appearances in the CanCam women's fashion magazine.

== Early years ==
She was born in Tai'an, China. Her father was an engineering professor and her mother was an elementary school teacher. She lived in China until she was 9 years old before emigrating to Japan with her family after her father was employed as a mechanical design engineer by a Japanese company.

== Education and career ==
At the age of 18 when she was an engineering student at Ibaraki University, she began her fashion modeling career after winning a large modeling contest, "LesPros Girls Audition 2008", held in Hawaii and Tokyo among several other places. She was dubbed the "next Gakky".

She became an exclusive model for the CanCam magazine. She has also worked irregularly in the professional runway scene and for several TV advertisements. She resides in Ibaraki and commutes between Ibaraki and Tokyo for between 10 and 15 fashion shoots / runway shows each month.

As of September 2012, she is one of CanCam's twelve exclusive models along with Rikako Sakata, Shizuka Kondo, Mew Azama, Aiku Maikawa, Mizuki Yamamoto, Hazuki Tsuchiya, Koharu Kusumi, Hikari Mori, Kaede, Naomi Trauden and Ikumi Hisamatsu.
