= Moe Oshikiri =

Japanese model (born 1979)

- Born: December 29, 1979 (age 46); Ichikawa, Chiba, Japan
- Years active: 2001-present
- Modeling information
- Height: 5 ft 6.5 in (1.69 m)
- Hair color: Black
- Eye color: Brown
- Agency: Pearl Co., Ltd.

Moe Oshikiri (押切 もえ, Oshikiri Moe; born December 29, 1979 in Ichikawa, Chiba, Japan) is a Japanese model best known her work with fashion magazine AneCan and its sister magazine CanCam, which Oshikiri was a former top model for. She is also a designer, starting her own Kimono line branded under her name, as well as a hosiery line with CanCam model Yuri Ebihara called f*ing motesto.

Her husband is Japanese baseball player Hideaki Wakui.

== Biography ==
Oshikiri graduated from a public school in Matsudo, Chiba. She went to Showa Daiichi high school, however she dropped out. After that, she re-entered Ichikawa-Nishi public high school located in Ichikawa, Chiba, as a repeat student, and has graduated. While a high school student, dokusha models (literally, reader models, are amateur models) were not yet popular in Japanese fashion magazines. However, she actively appeared in Popteen magazine during that time, she has started her modeling career. Afterwards, she became a star dokusha model for Egg magazine, and Popteen. At that time, she was a charismatic model for high school girls. Still, after graduating from Popteen she tried to change her image and began modeling for ViVi magazine. Though, the new image did not resonate with fans and she left the magazine. After her failed attempt to change her image, she signed up with CanCam magazine, in order to be a feminine model in 2001. After spending six years with CanCam and gaining a solid reputation, she became a star model for AneCan, a spin-off magazine of CanCam targeted at women in their mid- to late-20s.

== Career ==
=== Dramas ===
- Koi no Chikara (恋ノチカラ):1/10/2002 - 3/21 on Fuji television. she appeared in the first episode as a friend of main character.
- Damens Walker (だめんず・うぉ～か～):10/2006 on TV Asahi She appeared in the first episode as a cameo actress.

=== Variety Shows ===
- Eigo de Shabera Night (英語でしゃべらナイト):4/2007 - on NHK
- Omo san (オモ☆さん):4/2007 - on TV Asahi
- Toko Natsu Girl (常夏ガール):10/2003 - 3/2004 on TV Tokyo
- Moe Tabi (もえたび):9/2006 - 32007 on BS-i
- Super Bingo Night (スーパービンゴナイト):4/3/2007 on TBS. She was a MC with a comedian Keisuke Okada.
- Hiroshima SeeSaw (広島SeeSaw):5/5/2004 on Hiroshima Home TV. She was a guest.
- Mezamashi TV (めざましテレビ):3/5/2007 - 3/7/2007 on Fuji TV. She was a guest.
- Sta Men (タ☆メン):9/2005 - 3/2007 on Fuji TV. She was an occasional guest commenter
- World Basketball 2006(2006世界バスケ):2006 on TBS. She was a guest supporter.
- Ningen Korede Iinoda (人間!これでいいのだ):8/2006 - 2/2007 on TBS.
- F-1 Grand Prix in Japan 2006 (2006F1日本グランプリ):2006 on Fuji TV. She was a special supporter.
- 48th Japan Record Awards (第48回輝く!日本レコード大賞):12/30/2006 on TBS. She was a MC.
- Science Mystery (サイエンスミステリー それは運命か奇跡か!?～DNAが解き明かす人間の真実と愛～):2/17/2007 on Fuji TV. She was a MC.

=== Advertisements ===
- Sony Ericsson SO702i, SO703i
- Asahi Beer
- Mandom
- Este La Parler
- Serux Lover Wedding VIVACIOUS
- H.I.S.
- Johnson and Johnson (2007)
- lucido-L

=== Radios ===
- Oshikiri Moe no Moe Razi(押切もえのもえラジ):4/2005 - 3/2006 on NACK5

=== Fashion Shows ===
- Tokyo Girls Collection S/S 2007
- Tokyo Girls Collection A/W 2006
- Tokyo Girls Collection S/S 2006
- Tokyo Girls Collection A/W 2005

=== Web ===
- Girls-walker
- Fashion-walker

=== Magazines ===
- Egg
- Popteen
- ViVi
- CanCam
- AneCan

=== DVDs ===
- DOL BEAMS 2001 Vol.2 WAVEX - Emerald Color Of The Sea:7/25/2001 from BMG JAPAN
- Fight Girls (ファイト☆ガールズ):11/21/2003 from Geneon Entertainment
- Ai yue no Kodoku - the world of Osamu Dazai - (愛ゆえの孤独 ~太宰治の世界~ 押切もえ 辿る斜陽の時):11/3/2006 from Universal Music

=== Brands ===
- Kimonos "Moe Oshikiri":11/2004-
- Watches "WIRDE f.": 12/2005
- Hosiery "f-ing MOTESTO" 2/2007
