= Pakkun =

Pakkun may refer to:

- Patrick Harlan, an American comedian and gaijin tarento
- Pakkun, a Naruto summon
- Petey Piranha, known in Japan as Boss Packun (ボスパックン, Bosu Pakkun)
