= Demizu =

Demizu (written: 出水) is a Japanese surname. Notable people with the surname include:

- Mai Demizu (出水 麻衣, born 1984), Japanese TBS announcer, television presenter and newscaster
- Posuka Demizu (出水 ぽすか, born 1988), Japanese manga artist
