= Midori Kuzuoka =

Japanese model (born 1984)

- 葛岡 碧
- Born: January 30, 1984 (age 42); Natori, Miyagi, Japan
- Occupation: Model
- Years active: 2002 -
- Agent: Illume
- Height: 1.69 m (5 ft 7 in) (2011)

Midori Kuzuoka (葛岡 碧, Kuzuoka Midori; born January 30, 1984, in Natori, Miyagi, Japan) is a Japanese model who is represented by the talent agency, Illume.

== Biography ==
Kuzuoka graduated from Miyagi Prefecture Third Girls High School. She was mainly active in Sendai, and later appeared in the fashion magazine, Ray, and later moved to Tokyo from 2010. After that, Kuzuoka became an exclusive model for AneCam.

Her favorite colors are white, black, green, gold, and pink.

Kuzuoka has a brother.

== Filmography ==
=== Magazines ===
Year	Title	Notes
2002	Ray	
2010	AneCan	

==== Other ====
Year	Title	Notes
2004	Mina	
	Real Faces	
2005	Wedding Book	29th issue
2006	CM Now	May–June 2006 issue
2006	Flash	May 2, 2006 issue
2008	Weekly Young Jump	November 6, 2008 issue

=== DVD ===
Year	Title	Notes
2008	Hekiiro Colors	Liverpool

=== TV series ===
Year	Title	Network	Notes
2012	Girls Golf Club	Sun TV	
2012	Tokyo Precious Dating	TV Asahi	
2013	Love Gol	Sun	

=== Advertisements ===
Year	Title	Notes
2006	Kao "Essential Damage Care"	
2006	Marui "Party Dress"	
2008	AMO Japan "Concept One Step"	
2011	East Japan Railway Company "TYO Tokyo For You Campaign"	

==== Stills ====
Year	Title	Notes
2005	"Rue de B"	
2005	Laforet "2005 Autumn Collection"	
2006	AR "2006 S/S Image Model"	
2006	Jayro/Jayro Next "2006 S/S Image Model"	

=== Categories ===
Title	Notes
RyuRyu	
Dam Shop	
Senjukai	
Rapty	
Image	
Nissen	

==== Net catalogs ====
Year	Title	Notes
2005	Image Net	
2005	Woman Excite	

=== Fashion shows ===
Year	Title	Notes	Ref.
2004	Levi's Girl's Stand Out! 2004	Ebisu Garden Hall	
2005	Tokyo Girls Collection 2005 Aki Fuyu		
2006	Tokyo Girls Collection 2006 Haru Natsu		
2006	Tokyo Girls Collection 2006 Aki Fuyu		
2007	Kobe Girls Collection 2007 Shanghai		
2007	Tokyo Girls Collection 2007 Haru Natsu		
2007	Kobe Collection 2007 Aki Fuyu		
2007	Tokyo Girls Collection 2007 Aki Fuyu		
2008	Tokyo Girls Collection 2008 Haru Natsu		
2008	Kobe Collection 2008 Haru Natsu		
2008	Tokyo Girls Collection Beijing		
2008	Kobe Collection 2008 Aki Fuyu		
2008	Tokyo Girls Collection 2008 Aki Fuyu		
2008	Sendai Collection 2008		
2009	Tokyo Girls Collection 2009 Haru Natsu		
2009	Kobe Collection 2009 Aki		
2009	Tokyo Girls Collection 2009 Aki Fuyu		
2010	Tokyo Girls Collection 2010 Haru Natsu		
2010	Kobe Collection Tokyo		
2010	Tokyo Girls Collection Okinawa	Okinawa Convention Center	
2010	Girls Award 2010		
2011	Tokyo Girls Collection Nagoya		
2011	Tokyo Girls Collection 2011 Haru Natsu		
2011	Girls Award 2011 Haru Natsu		
2011	Sendai Collection 2011		
2012	Tokyo Girls Collection 2012 Haru Natsu		
2012	Kobe Collection 2012 Haru Natsu		
2012	Tohoku Collection 2012	Sendai Sun Plaza	
2013	Asia Collection Bangkok Runway 2013		
2013	Nagoya Collection 2013 Haru Natsu	Aichi Prefectural Gymnasium	
2013	Tokyo Girls Collection 2013 Haru Natsu		
2013	Kobe Collection 2013 Haru Natsu		
2013	Tokyo Runway 2013 Haru Natsu		
2013	Tokyo Girls Collection Shanghai		
2013	Kobe Collection 2013 Aki Fuyu		
2013	Tokyo Runway 2013 Aki Fuyu		
2013	Tohoku Dream Collection 2013	Sendai Sun Plaza	

=== Events ===
Year	Title	Notes	Ref.
2005	Ressepasse Presents Ray Model Midori Kuzuoka Fashion Talk Show	Shibuya Marui; Kobe Marui	
2005	Midori Kuzuka × Ray × Rue de B Decora Denim Happyōkai Fashion Talk Show	Printemps Giza, Odakyu Department Store, Shinjuku; Daimaru, Hanshin Department Store, Umeda	
2006	Midori Kuzuka × Ray × Rue de B Fashion Talk Show	Takashimaya, Mitsukoshi, Nagoya	
2006	Midori Kuzuka × Ray × Jayro Collabo T-shirt Happyō × 1-nichi Tenchō	Shinjuku Road Store	
2013	Rakuten × Orix Sen Shikyū-shiki	Miyagi Baseball Stadium	

=== Other ===
Year	Title	Notes
2011	Miyagi Prefectural Police "Sei Hanzai Bōshi Poster"	

=== Sendai era ===
These are during when she was belonged to MOC Fashion Model Agency in Sendai.

==== TV series ====
Year	Title	Network	Notes
2002	Irodorishoku Takemi Kirei	Sendai Television	Regular
2003	Otama Jacshi	Sendai Television	Program navigator

==== Advertisements ====
Year	Title	Notes
2001	NTT DoCoMo Tohoku	
2002	Au Hokkaido	
2003	Tohoku Electronic Professional School	

==== Magazines ====
Year	Title	Notes
	Ray	
	Cecil McBee A/W Book	
2003	Cecil McBee Book	
2003	RyuRyu Summer Issue	
2003	RyuRyu Fall Issue	

==== Fashion shows ====
Year	Title	Notes
2003	Future Eyes Tokyo Collection Haru Natsu	
