= Through Foreign Journalists' Eyes: Nippon in the World =

Japanese television series

- Genre: News, Discussion program
- Presented by: Patrick Harlan; Mai Demizu
- Narrated by: Mai Demizu
- Country of origin: Japan
- Original language: Japanese
- No. of episodes: 93

Production
- Running time: 54 minutes

Original release
- Network: BS-TBS
- Release: October 7, 2015 – September 30, 2018

Through Foreign Journalists' Eyes: Nippon in the World (外国人記者は見た!日本inザ・ワールド, Gaikokujinkisha wa mita! Nippon in za warudo) is a BS-TBS discussions program. It was originally broadcast on Wednesday night but after reformatting on October 2, 2016, as Through Foreign Journalists' Eyes Plus: Nippon in the World (外国人記者は見た+日本inザ・ワールド, Gaikokujinkisha wa mita purasu Nippon in za warudo), it was moved to Sunday night.

The program talks about social issues of Japan and thoroughly discusses how foreign journalists in Japan who report for mass media outside of Japan look at these issues.

The program was ended on September 30, 2018.

== Cast ==
- Hosts: Patrick Harlan, Mai Demizu
- Several foreign journalists in Japan
- Guests
