= Made in Twenty (20) =

Studio album by BoA
- Released: January 17, 2007
- Recorded: 2006–2007
- Genre: Pop
- Length: 68:06
- Language: Japanese
- Label: Avex Trax

BoA chronology
| Outgrow (2006) | Made in Twenty (20) (2007) | The Face (2008) |

Singles from Made in Twenty (20)
- 1. "Nanairo no Ashita (Brand New Beat) / Your Color" Released: April 5, 2006; 2. "Key of Heart / Dotch" Released: August 9, 2006; 3. "Winter Love" Released: November 1, 2006

Made in Twenty (20) is the fifth Japanese studio album (tenth overall) by South Korean singer BoA. It was released on January 17, 2007, by Avex Trax. The title of the album refers to the fact that this is her first album since leaving her teenage years and her first album made in her 20s - specifically, when she was twenty years old. The album debuted with first-week sales of 182,009 copies, debuting at number one.

== Singles ==
Made in Twenty (20) produced three singles: "Nanairo no Ashita (Brand New Beat) / Your Color" was first released as a double A-side on April 5, 2006. It peaked at number three on the Oricon Singles Chart and sold over 90,000 copies. The second double A-side single, "Key of Heart / Dotch", was released on August 9, 2006, although the track "Dotch" did not appear on the album. It peaked at number seven on the Oricon chart and sold 41,000 copies. The album's third single, "Winter Love", was released on November 1 and peaked at number two on Oricon, selling 100,000 copies.

All three singles were certified gold by the Recording Industry Association of Japan (RIAJ) for having shipped over 100,000 physical copies to retailers, while "Nanairo no Ashita (Brand New Beat)" and "Winter Love" were certified double platinum and triple platinum in ringtone downloads, respectively.

== Commercial performance ==
Made in Twenty (20) debuted at the top of the Oricon Daily Album Charts and held the position for all seven days of the week, until debuting at number one at the Oricon Weekly Album Charts. However, its first-week sales were then the lowest in BoA's career in Japan, as the album sold 182,009 copies in its debut week (its successor The Face sold fewer copies in its debut week). Despite its low sales if comparing with previous efforts, Made in Twenty (20) did more than enough to top the chart, outselling the number two spot (which was also held by another new entry that week) for 138,034 copies.

== Track listing ==
Made in Twenty (20) – Standard edition
| No. | Title | Length |
|---|---|---|
| 1. | "Lady Galaxy" | 3:26 |
| 2. | "Nanairo no Ashita (Brand New Beat)" (七色の明日 ~Brand New Beat~) | 4:33 |
| 3. | "Winter Love" | 5:44 |
| 4. | "Still" | 4:49 |
| 5. | "So Real" | 3:17 |
| 6. | "Key of Heart" | 5:02 |
| 7. | "Our Love ~To My Parents~" | 4:42 |
| 8. | "No More Make Me Sick" | 3:53 |
| 9. | "Revolution-Code: 1986-1105" (featuring Rah-D) | 3:54 |
| 10. | "Your Color" | 4:57 |
| 11. | "Prayer" | 3:30 |
| 12. | "Candle Lights" | 4:25 |
| 13. | "Gracious Days" | 5:35 |
| 14. | "Last Christmas" (bonus track) | 5:04 |
| 15. | "Winter Love" (Live version; CD first press only) |
| Total length: | | 1:08:06 |

Made in Twenty (20) – DVD
| No. | Title | Length |
|---|---|---|
| 1. | "Nanairo no Ashita (Brand New Beat)" (music video) |
| 2. | "Key of Heart" (music video) |
| 3. | "Winter Love" (music video) |
| 4. | "BoA the Live" |

BoA the Live – DVD
| No. | Title | Length |
|---|---|---|
| 1. | "Listen to My Heart" |
| 2. | "Valenti" |
| 3. | "Soundscape" |
| 4. | "Ain't No Sunshine" |
| 5. | "Make a Secret" |
| 6. | "Moon & Sunrise" |
| 7. | "Winter Love" |
| 8. | "Meri Kuri" |
| 9. | "Nanairo no Ashita (Brand New Beat)" (First press edition only) |
| 10. | "Everlasting" (First press edition only) |

== Charts ==
=== Weekly charts ===
| Chart (2007) | Peak position |
|---|---|
| Japanese Albums (Oricon) | 1 |
| Taiwanese Albums (G-Music) | 6 |
| Taiwanese J-pop Albums (G-Music) | 1 |

=== Monthly charts ===
| Chart (2007) | Peak position |
|---|---|
| South Korean Int'l Albums (MIAK) | 1 |

=== Year-end charts ===
| Chart (2007) | Position |
|---|---|
| Japanese Albums (Oricon) | 31 |

== Sales and certifications ==
| Region | Certification | Certified units/sales |
|---|---|---|
| Japan (RIAJ) | Platinum | 348,093 |
| South Korea | — | 17,482 |
