= Winter Love =

Single by BoA

from the album Made in Twenty (20)
- Released: November 1, 2006
- Recorded: 2006
- Label: Avex Trax
- Producer: Lee Soo Man

BoA singles chronology
"Key of Heart / Dotch" (2006)	"Winter Love" (2006)	"Sweet Impact" (2007)

"Winter Love" is BoA's 21st Japanese single. It was released on November 1, 2006. It hit #2 on the Oricon Charts with sales of 42,481, making it the highest charting BoA single since "Do the Motion", which was released in March 2005. Formats are 「CD+DVD」 and 「CD only」.The single was released just before her twentieth birthday (November 5, 2006).

This single has met with success compared to her last single "Key of Heart / Dotch", and has outsold "Nanairo no Ashita: Brand New Beat / Your Color".

Her song "Candle Lights" was used as the ending theme of Japanese dub version of Korean film A Millionaire's First Love.

== Track listing ==
=== CD ===
==== First Press Edition ====
1. Winter Love
2. Candle Lights
3. Last Christmas (Bonus track)
4. Winter Love (TV Mix)
5. Candle Lights (TV Mix)

==== Regular Edition ====
1. Winter Love
2. Candle Lights
3. Winter Love (TV Mix)
4. Candle Lights (TV Mix)

=== DVD ===
1. Winter Love (PV)

== TV performances ==
- October 25, 2006 — Hey! Hey! Hey!
- October 27, 2006 — PopJam
- October 28, 2006 — CDTV
- October 29, 2006 — MUSIC EXPRESS
- October 29, 2006 — Utawara
- November 3, 2006 — Music Fighter
- November 3, 2006 — Music Station
- November 5, 2006 — BoA The Live 20th Birthday Special Event
- November 25, 2006 — MelodiX!
- December 2, 2006 — Music Fair 21 ("Winter Love" and "Meri Kuri")

== Charts ==
"Winter Love" debuted at #2 on Oricon Daily Singles Chart, but rose to #1 on its fourth day out. It landed at #2 on the weekly charts, being kept out of number one by a narrow 3,814 copies. Its total sales outsold the number one single's total sales that week. The single's debut sales and position were very high, compared to her previous single "Key of Heart / Dotch", which had low sales due to poor promotion by her record label, Avex Trax. Despite competition from many other major new releases, this single continued its success. It sold double the amount of "Key of Heart / Dotch's" total sales, and outsold "Nanairo no Ashita: Brand New Beat / Your Color".

Oricon Sales Chart

Release	Chart	Peak position	Sales total
November 1, 2006	Oricon Daily Singles Chart	1	
November 1, 2006	Oricon Weekly Singles Chart	2	99,078
November 1, 2006	Oricon Monthly Singles Chart	7	
November 1, 2006	Oricon Yearly Singles Chart	98	
