= Manami Ōno =

Japanese singer and media personality (born 2007)

- 大野愛実
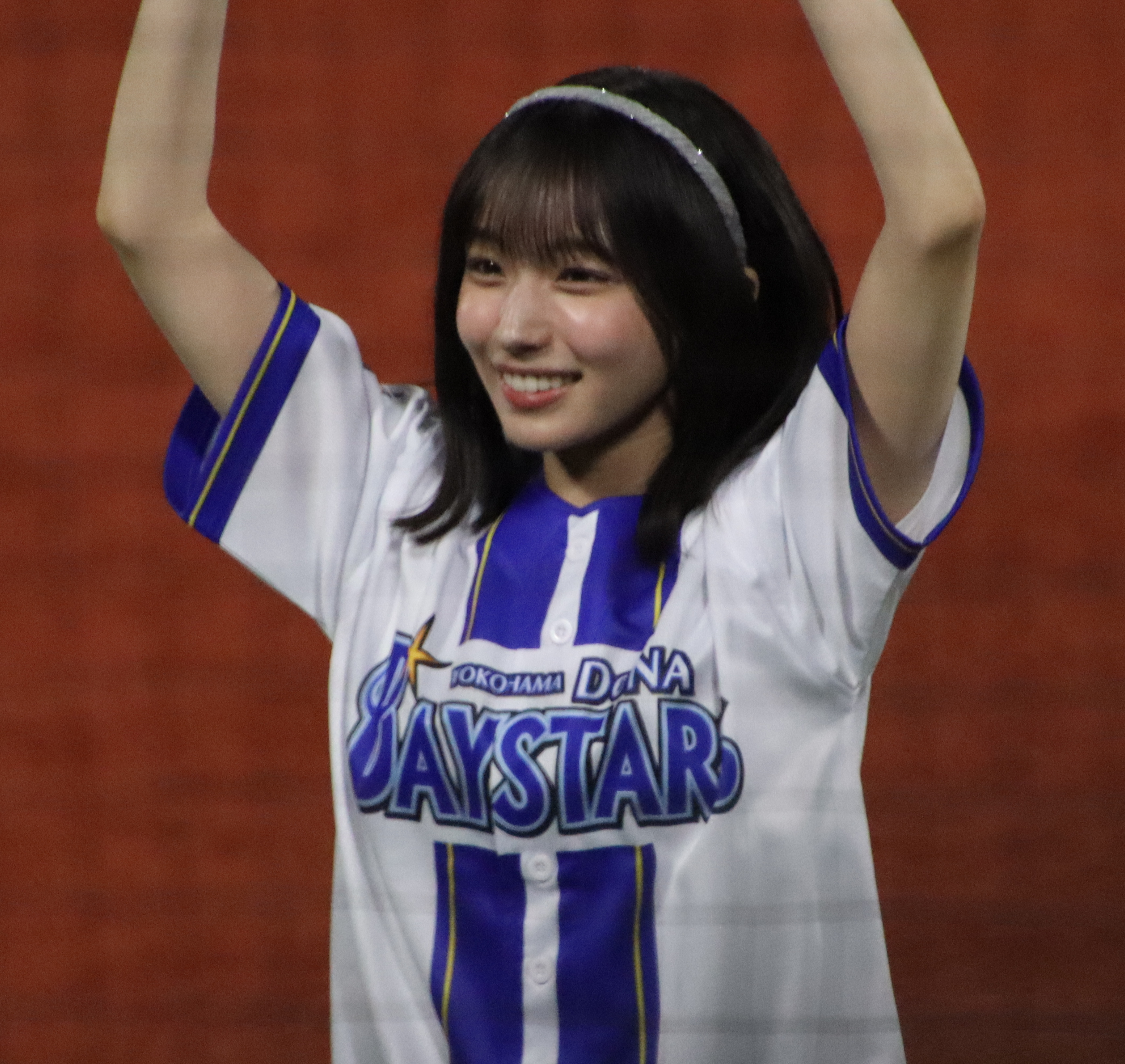
- Manami Ōno in 2026
- Born: May 5, 2007 (age 19); Tokyo, Japan
- Occupations: Singer; model; media personality
- Years active: 2025–present
- Height: 153 cm (5 ft 0 in)
- Musical career
- Genre: J-pop
- Label: Sony
- Member of: Hinatazaka46
- Website: Official website

Manami Ōno (Japanese: 大野愛実, Hepburn: Ōno Manami; born May 5, 2007) is a Japanese singer, model, and media personality. She is a member of the girl group Hinatazaka46 and exclusive model for the fashion magazine CanCam.

Ōno joined Hinatazaka46 in 2025 and has been the lead performer for the single "Cliffhanger" (2026). She made her acting debut in 2026 and has walked the runway at the GirlsAward fashion show.

== Early life ==
Manami Ōno was born and raised in Tokyo and has an older brother. She has 10 years of ballet experience. In middle school, she participated in a student exchange program to the United Kingdom. She had been a "hardcore" Hinatazaka46 fan before joining the group, with a particular fondness for fourth-generation member Kirari Takeuchi; Takeuchi would later reveal that her sister had once noticed Ōno at the merchandise booth of one of the group's concerts.

== Career ==
Ōno debuted in Hinatazaka46 as part of the fifth generation in March 2025. Her debut stage appearance was in the sixth Hinatansai anniversary concert at the Yokohama Stadium.

Ōno became the center (lead performer) for the fifth generation's debut song, "German Iris", released with the group's 14th single, "Love Yourself!" (2025). She then became the center for Hinatazaka46's 16th single, "Cliffhanger" (2026), making her the first title song center from the group's fifth generation; E-Talent Bank noted her "significant potential" and "expressive power".

The fashion website Modelpress named Ōno one of seven female artists predicted to make a breakthrough in 2026, describing her as "the strongest beautiful girl Sakamichi has ever discovered" and "a bright new talent shaping Hinatazaka's future" taking on her first single center role. She made her acting debut in the 2026 NHK drama Radio Star (ラジオスター) as a character with a similar name to her own, Mana Ono (小野まな, Ono Mana; with a short o). Real Sound noted her "expressiveness" in her debut role, while co-star Takako Tokiwa, who portrayed Mana's mother, praised her eagerness to learn and considered her an "exceptional talent"; meanwhile, chief director Masae Ichiki noted her energy and ability to fully immerse into her role.

In March 2026, Ōno became an exclusive model for the fashion magazine CanCam. The magazine's editorial team described Ōno as the group's "promising new ace" with an "expressiveness beyond that of a newcomer". The feature also highlighted the "unprecedented speed" of her career milestones within a year of her debut, as well as her "unique" diction and "ability to comment" in her television and radio appearances. She made her debut runway appearance at the GirlsAward Spring/Summer in April and graced the magazine's cover for the first time for its August 2026 issue, released in late June.

In August, Ōno became the first active Hinatazaka46 member to appear in a series of commercials for the fast food chain McDonald's. She appeared as the character Ms. Tokuninald, (Note: A wordplay on toku ni naru (得になる), transl. a good deal) the female counterpart to Mr. Tokuninald, who was portrayed by actor Masato Sakai in a previous series. She also performed an homage to the music video of the Vocaloid song "Dandan Hayaku naru" (だんだん早くなる; lit. 'Getting Faster and Faster') by 40mP alongside child actress Yuno Nagao.

== Personal life ==
Ōno owns a pet turtle named Midori. She also enjoys insect catching (虫取り, mushi-tori) and once bred around 30 rhinoceros beetles in a single cage as a child.

Ōno admires author Osamu Dazai for his "rock-and-roll" way of life, and hopes that she and Hinatazaka46 would be remembered through history like the Buddhist monk Kūkai.

== Discography ==
The following are Ōno's notable contributions to Hinatazaka46's discography.

- "German Iris" (2025, released with "Love Yourself!"), debut song and debut as center (lead performer)
- "Cliffhanger" (2026), title song center

== Filmography ==
=== Television series ===
Year	Title	Role	Notes	Ref(s)
2026	Radio Star	Mana Ono		

== Other appearances ==
=== Commercial ===
- "Ms. Tokuninald", McDonald's Japan (2026)

=== Radio ===
- Hinatazaka46 Manami Ōno's All Night Nippon 0 (Zero) (January 24, 2026, Nippon Broadcasting System), special host
