= AneCan =

Japanese fashion magazine

AneCan 姉キャン
- May 2007 AneCan cover featuring Moe Oshikiri
- Categories: Fashion
- Frequency: Monthly
- Circulation: 624,668 (2014)
- Publisher: Shogakukan
- First issue: 7 March 2007
- Final issue: December 2016
- Country: Japan
- Based in: Tokyo
- Language: Japanese
- Website: AneCan

AneCan (姉キャン, Anekyan) was a Japanese fashion magazine published by Shogakukan. The name derives from Ane (姉) meaning "older sister" and Can from its sister magazine CanCam. The magazine targeted women in their mid-late twenties, previous readers of CanCam.

== History and profile ==
AneCan was first launched in March 2007 as the magazine for women who have graduated from reading CanCam. "Ane" means "older sister" and "Can" comes from CanCam.

For the magazines launch the department store Isetan and several clothing companies collaborated with AneCan to create completely new brands. On 14 March 2007, Senken Shimbun reported that the "AneCan Style" brands sold 30,000,000 JPY (~US$250,000) in just four days.

On 10 August 2016, it was revealed that the magazine would be suspended after the December 2016 issue.

== Exclusive contract models ==
All of these models are under exclusive contract with AneCan, limiting their professional appearances to the magazine.

=== Current ===
- Erika Mori
- Midori Kuzuoka
- Moe Oshikiri
- Miki Arimura
- Shizuka Kondo
- Mew Azama
- Sayaka Isoyama
- Mitsuki Oishi
- Risako Ishikawa

=== Past ===
- alan
- Asami Usuda
- Eriko Kumazawa
- Keiko Mayama
- Maimi Okuwa
- Hitomi Sawano
- Raima Sharma
- Yoko Horiuchi
- Sachi Suzuki
- Reiko Takagaki
- Yuri Ebihara
- Sayaka Isoyama
