= Mai Demizu =

Japanese television announcer

- 出水 麻衣
- Born: February 11, 1984 (age 42); Tokyo, Japan
- Other names: Maimai; Demi-chan (デミちゃん)
- Education: Sophia University Faculty of Foreign Languages Department of English
- Occupation: Announcer
- Years active: 2006–
- Agent: Cent Force (during college)
- Style: Variety show; sports
- Height: 160 cm (5 ft 3 in)
- Website: TBS Television

Mai Demizu (出水 麻衣, Demizu Mai; born February 11, 1984, in Tokyo, Japan) is a female TBS announcer, television presenter, and newscaster. She is nicknamed as Demi-chan (デミちゃん) and Demicchan (でみっちゃん). Her hobbies are watching sports, gourmet tour, watching theater, playing golf, and running. She is ambassador of Aioi, Hyōgo Prefecture.

== Early life ==
Mai Demizu was born on February 11, 1984, in Tokyo, Japan. Her father was English interpreter. During her elementary school fourth grade, she moved with her family to Georgia, until she was second year high school. After returning to Japan, she entered International Christian University High School and graduates. She later entered Sophia University, on 2003 she won Miss Campus Navi Grand Prix. During her college days, she taking English language.

== Career ==
In April 2006, Mai Demizu joins TBS as announcer, synchronizing with Mayumi Mizuno and Ryusuke Ito. On September 30 on same year, she making debut as announcer at a quiz show All-Star Thanksgiving, which she served as a break time promoter for the program. On August 25 until September 2, 2007, she served as a reporter at 2007 World Championships in Athletics which held in Osaka, she supported and interviewed. After that, she often appeared as a reporter in sports broadcasting. In March 2009, she became assistant on Discovery of the World's Mysteries, replacing Maya Kobayashi whom she left as TBS announcer. On July 13, 2015, she became ambassador of Aioi, Hyogo Prefecture.

== Personal life ==
She is an only child.

She is fluent in English, and scored 980 points on the TOEIC.

As of autumn 2021, she was taking post-graduate college with the aim of obtaining a Master of Business Administration.

== Current appearances ==
=== Television ===
Year	Japanese title	Role	Network
2009–present	Discovery of the World's Mysteries	2nd MC assistant	TBS
2018–present	JNN News on Hiruobi	Mondays to Wednesdays anchor	TBS
2018–present	GO GO!Smile!	News Manager anchor from Mondays to Wednesdays	CBC
2018–present	News 1930	Tuesdays, Wednesdays, and Fridays co-anchor	BS-TBS
2023–present	N Suta	Sunday anchor	TBS

=== Radio ===
Year	Title	Role	Radio Network
2015–present	Junko Koshino MASACA	Assistant	TBS Radio
2015–present	Saturday Wide Radio Tokyo Chaki Chaki with Nights Large Broadcast	Assistant	TBS Radio

== Former appearances ==
=== Television (TBS) ===
==== Regular appearances ====
Year	Title	Role	Network
2006 - 2009	J-SPO	Assistant caster	TBS
2006 - 2008	Chikushi Tetsuya NEWS 23	Sports corner anchor	TBS
2008 - 2009	NEWS23	Sports corner anchor	TBS
2008 - 2009	Mega Digital	Host	TBS
2009 - 2010	Venus Search	Moderator	TBS
2010 - 2011	Dream Weavers ~NEXT DOOR~	3rd narrator	TBS
2009 - 2014	King's Brunch	Progress Announcer	TBS, BS-TBS
2010 - 2014	Tsubokko	Host	TBS, BS-TBS
2011 - 2013	Cat Chat KIDS!	Daisy	BS-TBS
2014 - 2015	JNN News Flash	Tuesday announcer	TBS
2015 - 2018	Jijihoudan	MC assistant	TBS, BS-TBS
2015 - 2018	Weekly News LIFE	Co-anchor	BS-TBS
2015 - 2018	Through Foreign Journalists' Eyes: Nippon in the World	Co-anchor	BS-TBS

==== Drama appearances ====
Year	Title	Role	Notes
2010	Ojiichan wa 25-sai	NEWS720 reporter	Episode 1

=== Television (Other than TBS) ===
Appeared on	Title	Network
July 2012	Morita Kazuyoshi Hour: Waratte Itomo!	Fuji TV
July 2012	Gyōretsuno Dekiru Hōritsusōdanjo	Nippon TV

== Films ==
Year	Title	Role	Notes
2010	My Darling Is a Foreigner	Reporter	Cameo

== Bibliography ==
=== Magazines ===
- CanCam
  - January 2009 issue
  - August 2010 issue
- Weekly Playboy (July 8, 2013 issue)
