= Eigo de Shabera Night =

- Starring: Moe Oshikiri; Patrick Harlan; Norito Yashima
- Country of origin: Japan
- Original languages: Japanese; English

Production
- Running time: 29 minutes

Original release
- Network: NHK
- Release: March 31, 2003 – March 16, 2009

Eigo de Shabera Night (英語でしゃべらナイト, Eigo de shabera naito) is a Japanese talk show by NHK. The show began in 2003 and ended in 2009, but is ongoing as a special program. Contrary to the title, Japanese is the main language used in the show, although the Japanese hosts use English when interviewing British, American or Irish celebrities, such as Noel Gallagher, Howard Stringer and Colin Farrell, or when the English language is discussed.

Pakkun Eiken (パックン英検) is a quiz where Patrick Harlan defines a certain word in English, after which contestants must produce the word in question. Other sections of the show include London Online and The Strongest English Project in History!? (史上最強!?の英語プロジェクト, Shijou Saikyou!? no Eigo Purojekuto).

At the end of its run in 2009, NHK announced that regular episodes of the show would be cancelled, but that "special editions of the program will be aired on an irregular basis".

== Cast ==
=== Current cast ===
- Moe Oshikiri (押切 もえ, Oshikiri Moe) - since April, 2007
- Patrick Harlan (パトリック・ハーラン, Patorikku Hāran)
- Norito Yashima (八嶋 智人, Yashima Norito) - since April, 2007
- Minoru Aoi (青井 実, Aoi Minoru) - since April, 2007

=== Past cast ===
- Yumiko Shaku (釈 由美子, Shaku Yumiko) - March 31, 2003—March, 2007
- Kazuya Matsumoto (松本 和也, Matsumoto Kazuya) - March 31, 2003—March, 2007

=== Narrators ===
- John Kabira (ジョン・カビラ, Jon Kabira) - narrator, March 31, 2003—September, 2006, since April 2008
- Chris Peppler (クリス・ペプラー, Kurisu Pepurā) - narrator, October, 2006—March 17, 2008, March 16, 2009

=== Other ===
- Rei Kikukawa (菊川 怜, Kikukawa Rei) - guest
- Chieko Kawabe (河辺 千恵子, Kawabe Chieko) - regular guest
- Yuzuki Muroi (室井 佑月, Muroi Yuzuki)

== Theme songs ==
- The opening song from March 31, 2003 until March, 2006: "Help!" performed by the Beatles
- The opening song from April, 2006 until March 23, 2007: "Help!" covered by Love Psychedelico
- The opening song from April, 2007 until March 2008: "Magical Mystery Tour" covered by Bonnie Pink
- The ending song: "A Hard Day's Night" performed by the Beatles.

== Broadcasting times ==
- March 31, 2003—March, 2006: 11:15 p.m.—11:45 p.m. on Mondays
- April, 2006—March, 2007: 11:00 p.m.—11:30 p.m. on Fridays
- April, 2007—March, 2009: 11:00 p.m.—11:30 p.m. on Mondays
  - Reruned at 2:10 a.m. on Saturdays
