= Key of Heart / Dotch =

"Key of Heart" / "Dotch"
- Japanese single cover

Single by BoA

from the album Made in Twenty (20)
- Released: August 9, 2006 (Japan); September 21, 2006 (South Korea)
- Genre: Pop
- Length: 8:19
- Label: Avex Trax; SM
- Lyricist: Gen Katō
- Producer: H-Wonder

BoA singles chronology
"Nanairo no Ashita: Brand New Beat / Your Color" (2006)	"Key of Heart" / "Dotch" (2006)	"Winter Love" (2006)

Alternative cover
- Korean single cover

Music video
- "Key of Heart" (Japanese ver.) on YouTube

"Key of Heart / Dotch" is a double A-side single by South Korean recording artist BoA for her fifth Japanese studio album Made in Twenty (20) (2007). It was released in Japan as a CD+DVD on August 9, 2006, and served as her 20th Japanese single under Avex Trax. In South Korea, "Key of Heart" was released by SM Entertainment as her first digital Korean single on September 21, 2006. Compared to previous singles, the sales for "Key of Heart" were low in Japan, but this was due to BoA being preoccupied with other projects and the lack of promotion from Avex Trax.

== Background and release ==
"Key of Heart" was released in Japan as a double A-side single with "Dotch" under Avex Trax on August 9, 2006, and was available solely in CD+DVD format in Japan with a "special summer low price" and first pressing to commemorate this for being her 20th single. The title of the song "Dotch" is not an English word, but an English transliteration of the Japanese word "どっち" (Dotchi; meaning "which one"). The Korean version of "Key of Heart" was released as BoA's first digital single in South Korea on September 21, 2006. A CD+DVD version of the single was later released in the country on October 25.

== Music video ==
=== Japanese version ===
The Japanese version of "Key of Heart" music video features BoA singing in a suburb land while driving a jeep. Then dancing on a mountain with 4 other dancers then she meets up with the dancers in a little town, they then dance on the streets. This music video also features BoA singing next to a river. Music video was shot in Lone Pine, California.

=== Korean version ===
The music video for the Korean version of "Key of Heart" features Donghae from Super Junior. It shows BoA in a relationship with Donghae who gives her a necklace with a heart pendant (a couple pendant). On her first performance, Donghae decides to give her flowers before she goes on stage and ends up in an accident due to which he dies. A scientist decides to make him a cyborg and succeeds in making a cyborg Donghae. Donghae notices that BoA is wearing the pendant he had given her before he died and realizes that she was the one he loved. He then appears in all of her performances/public appearances and takes photos of her.

During one of these outings he sees her current boyfriend and is heartbroken but continues taking photos of her. On another occasion, he goes to take photos of her during her rehearsal and a stage light nearly falls on her. He quickly leaps in and saves her. She picks up his camera and sees her photos on it. The video ends with them crossing paths and her noticing the heart pendant attached to his camera as a charm. She sees the photos of their past and starts crying as the security guards don't let her go to Donghae.

== Commercial endorsements ==
In South Korea, "Key of Heart" was used for a Olympus Korea camera CF. In Japan, it was used as the theme song for the Japanese version of the movie Over the Hedge and also served as a background song in the music.jp commercials. "Dotch" was used as the background song for the Kosé Fasio mascara commercials.

== Promotion and live performances ==
In Japan, BoA performed "Key of Heart" on the January 26, 2007 broadcast of Music Station. The song was included on the set lists of several of her concert tours in Japan, including BoA The Live 2006 and Made in Twenty (20) Arena Tour 2007.

== Track listing ==
Japanese CD single
No.	Title	Lyrics	Music	Length
1.	"Key of Heart"	Gen Katō	H-Wonder	4:59
2.	"Dotch"	Natsumi Watanabe	Kenzie	3:19
3.	"Key of Heart" (English version) (first press edition only)		H-Wonder	4:59
Total length:				13:17

Korean CD single – First press edition
No.	Title	Lyrics	Music	Length
1.	"Key of Heart"	Gen Katō	H-Wonder	4:59
2.	"Dotch"	Natsumi Watanabe	Kenzie	3:19
3.	"Key of Heart" (English version)		H-Wonder	4:59
4.	"Key of Heart" (Korean version)		H-Wonder	4:59
Total length:				18:16

DVD track listing
No.	Title	Length
1.	"Key of Heart" (video clip)
2.	"Key of Heart" (road movie) (first press edition only)

== Charts ==
=== Weekly charts ===
Chart (2006)	Peak position
Japan Singles (Oricon)	7

=== Monthly charts ===
Chart (2006)	Peak position
Japan Singles (Oricon)	20

== Sales and certifications ==
Region	Certification	Certified units/sales
Japan (RIAJ) Physical single	Gold	41,000

== Release history ==
Release history and formats
Region	Date	Format(s)	Label
Japan	August 9, 2006	CD+DVD	Avex Trax
South Korea	September 21, 2006	Digital download, streaming	SM Entertainment
South Korea	October 25, 2006	CD+DVD	SM Entertainment
