= Detective Conan: Dimensional Sniper =

- Theatrical release poster
- Kanji: 名探偵コナン 異次元の狙撃手(スナイパー)
- Revised Hepburn: Meitantei Konan: Ijigen no Sunaipā
- Directed by: Kobun Shizuno
- Written by: Kazunari Kochi
- Based on: Case Closed by Gosho Aoyama
- Produced by: Michihiko Suwa
- Starring: Minami Takayama; Kappei Yamaguchi; Rikiya Koyama; Wakana Yamazaki; Megumi Hayashibara; Shūichi Ikeda; Ryotaro Okiayu; Noriko Hidaka; Naoko Matsui; Yukiko Iwai; Ikue Ohtani; Wataru Takagi; Kazuhiko Inoue; Ikue Ohtani; Atsuko Yuya; Chafurin; Miyuki Ichijo; Kiyoyuki Yanada; Sota Fukushi; Patrick Harlan; Kazuya Nakai
- Cinematography: Ikuyo Fujita; Kazuki Kosuda
- Edited by: Terumitsu Okada
- Music by: Katsuo Ono; Aki Yokoyama; Masakazu Yokoyama; Hisako Ono; Takao Kondo
- Production company: TMS Entertainment
- Distributed by: Toho
- Release date: April 19, 2014
- Running time: 110 minutes
- Country: Japan
- Language: Japanese
- Box office: ¥4 billion

Detective Conan: Dimensional Sniper (名探偵コナン 異次元の狙撃手(スナイパー), Meitantei Konan: Ijigen no Sunaipā) is a 2014 Japanese anime film directed by Kobun Shizuno and part of the film series based on the Case Closed manga and anime series. A USA military's former sniper causes the FBI to become involved. The teaser trailer of this film was released on December 7, 2013.

== Plot ==
Sonoko invites Conan, Agasa, Ran, Kogoro and the Detective Boys to the pre-opening ceremony and the observation deck of Bell Tree Tower, built by the Suzuki Financial Group. While they are there, a sniper shoots at one of the guests, Hiroaki Fujinami, from a nearby building. Conan, having observed the possible suspect, pursues the suspect with Masumi Sera joining later. The suspect blows up police patrol cars during the escape and despite the FBI's attempt to follow the suspect, the suspect jumps away to the Tokyo Bay. Tokyo Metropolitan Police and FBI later concludes that Timothy Hunter, an ex-Navy SEALS and former recipient of Silver Star decoration is a possible suspect. The FBI believes Hunter also attempted to murder two former American military officers, Jack Waltz and Bill Murphy, and another Japanese civilian, Hitoshi Moriyama.

FBI investigation revealed that Hunter may have been supplied equipment from either Scott Grean, Kevin Yoshino or Mark Spencer, all of which are former United States Forces Japan officials. While the investigation is ongoing, Moriyama was sniped from great lengths, and Hunter was killed. Media speculation spread news that the recent sniping may be a random spree, creating public chaos. The same night, Murphy who was in Nikkō with Waltz was asked to come to Tokyo by letter apparently written by Mark Spencer. In an attempt to stop Murphy's assassination on the train, Conan attempted to block line of culprit's sight only to be in line of culprit itself. Sera injured herself while attempting to push Conan out of sight and was taken to a hospital while Murphy was eventually killed.

Fearing for his own safety and also being asked by the American military officials in Japan to end the case quietly, Jack Waltz attempted to murder the culprit in the entire case. Unbeknownst to Waltz, Waltz himself is the last target of the culprit, Kevin Yoshino. Yoshino is Hunter's student and the two help crafted the plan to revenge against Waltz and Murphy for attempting to assassinate Hunter during the Middle East operation to ensure that Hunter will not receive the Silver Star decorations. Hunter survived the attempted murder but is severely wounded and discharged from the Navy, only to face misfortune from Fujinami and Moriyama. Conan, who happened to realize that Waltz is about to be murdered, push Waltz away, causing Yoshino who is sniping from Bell Tree Tower to switch target. While under fire, a mysterious sniper Subaru Okiya shot Yoshino, shocking Yoshino as the range of fire greatly surpasses his or Hunter's ability. Yoshino take cover in the observation deck of Bell Tree Tower and took Ayumi hostage. While Yoshino is fighting with FBI, Okiya attempted to take down Yoshino from afar, but was blocked from clear line of sight and lack of lighting to guide the target. Conan, having realized Okiya's plan, kicked the ball from his position which exploded into fireworks, disabling the night vision goggles Yoshino is wearing. Okiya is able to shoot and disable Yoshino's weapon, making way for Ran and FBI to take him to custody. Okiya later answered a call by James Black, the chief of FBI in Japan, with Shuichi Akai's voice.

== Cast ==
- Minami Takayama as Conan Edogawa
- Wakana Yamazaki as Ran Mori
- Rikiya Koyama as Kogoro Mori
- Kappei Yamaguchi as Shinichi Kudo
- Megumi Hayashibara as Ai Haibara
- Naoko Matsui as Sonoko Suzuki
- Kazuhiko Inoue as Ninzaburo Shiratori
- Ikue Ohtani as Mitsuhiko Tsuburaya
- Wataru Takagi as Genta Kojima/Wataru Takagi
- Chafurin as Inspector Megure
- Atsuko Yuya as Officer Sato
- Miyuki Ichijo as Jodie Starling
- Shūichi Ikeda as Shuichi Akai
- Kiyoyuki Yanada as Andre Camel
- Noriko Hidaka as Masumi Sera
- Ryotaro Okiayu as Subaru Okiya
- Sota Fukushi as Kevin Yoshino
- Patrick Harlan as Jack Waltz
- Kazuya Nakai as Timothy Hunter

== Release ==
This film was released for free, available to view for one week, on TMS Entertainment's English YouTube channel as part of the "Detective Conan: Cinema Saturdays" promotion, on August 16, 2025, with English subtitles. It was the first time this film had ever been officially premiered in North America.

== Reception ==
The film has grossed ¥4 billion in Japan.
