= Nanairo no Ashita (Brand New Beat)/Your Color =

"Nanairo no Ashita: Brand New Beat / Your Color"

Single by BoA

from the album Made in Twenty (20)
- Released: April 5, 2006
- Recorded: 2006
- Genre: J-pop
- Label: Avex Trax
- Producer(s): Lee Soo Man

BoA singles chronology
| "Everlasting" (2005) | "Nanairo no Ashita: Brand New Beat / Your Color" (2006) | "Key of Heart / Dotch" (2006) |

Alternative Cover

"Nanairo no Ashita: Brand New Beat / Your Color" is BoA's nineteenth Japanese single and her fifth double A-side single. It is her first single to be released in both CD and in CD+DVD formats. The former is an upbeat pop song while the latter is a ballad, similar to her previous single, Everlasting. This is her first single released off of her fifth Japanese studio album, Made in Twenty (20).

== Overview ==
Although Nanairo no Ashita: Brand New Beat / Your Color didn't reach the top spot on the charts, its first week sales were the highest BoA had achieved since Do the Motion. Moreover, the long chart life which the single was able to achieve allowed it to become her 8th highest selling single to date. The single debuted at number one on its first day, however it wasn't able to secure the number one spot on the weekly charts. Instead, it debuted third on the chart. On iTunes however, the single reached the number one spot. Nanairo no Ashita reached to the number one spot on its own, while Your Color reached the number fourth spot.

== Music video ==
BoA's Brand New Beat music video featured many scenes where she and three other female dancers were dancing and playing games with the other four male dancers. Two music videos were filmed for Brand New Beat, one was the standard version and the other was the Dance version which is similar to the standard version but with more dance segments.

== Commercial endorsements ==
Nanairo no Ashita ~Brand New Beat~ was used as the theme song in a KOSE Fasio commercial. Your Color was used as the ending theme song for Xbox 360 game Ninety-Nine Nights. Nanairo no Ashita is also included in the special album Sweet Memories with Girls' Generation.

== Track listing ==
=== CD ===
1. Nanairo no Ashita: Brand New Beat
2. Your Color
3. Nanairo no Ashita: Brand New Beat (TV Mix)
4. Your Color (TV Mix)

=== DVD ===
1. Nanairo no Ashita: Brand New Beat (PV)
2. Nanairo no Ashita: Brand New Beat (Dance Version)

== TV performances ==
- March 31, 2006 — Music Station Spring Super Live - "Nanairo no Ashita ~Brand New Beat~"
- April 3, 2006 — Hey! Hey! Hey! 500th Episode Special Live - "Nanairo no Ashita ~Brand New Beat~"
- April 7, 2006 — Music Fighter - "Your Color"
- April 15, 2006 — CDTV - "Your Color"
- December 22, 2006 — Music Station Super Live 2006 - "Nanairo no Ashita ~Brand New Beat~"

== Charts ==
'Oricon Sales Chart

| Release | Chart | Peak position | Sales total |
|---|---|---|---|
| April 5, 2006 | Oricon Daily Singles Chart | 1 | |
| April 5, 2006 | Oricon Weekly Singles Chart | 3 | 90,936 copies |
| April 5, 2006 | Oricon Monthly Singles Chart | 7 | |
| April 5, 2006 | Oricon Yearly Singles Chart | 100 | |
