= Kiyoshi Hikawa =

Japanese singer

Kiyoshi Hikawa 氷川 きよし
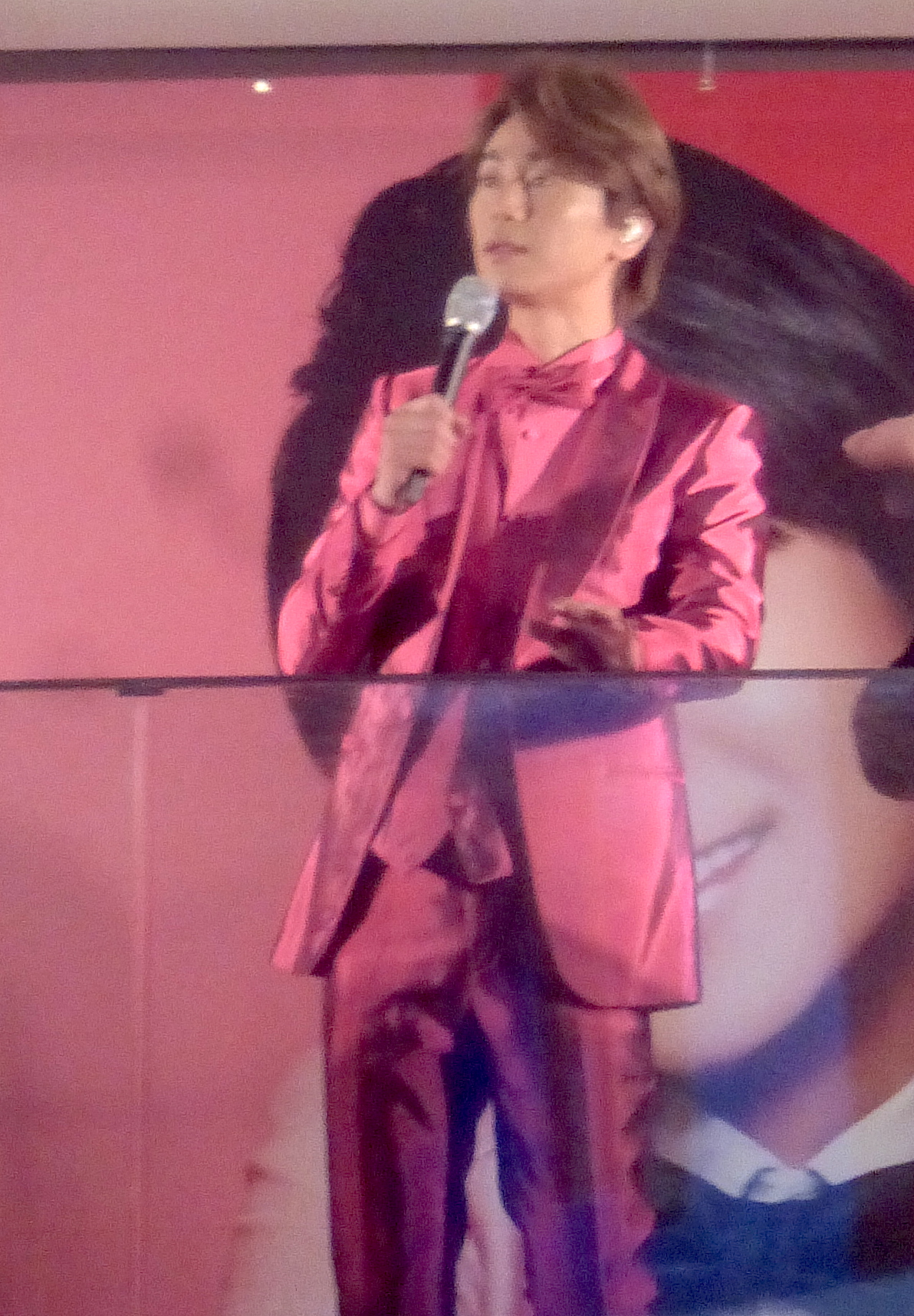
- Performing in Shimbashi, 2018

Background information
- Born: Kiyoshi Yamada (山田 清志); September 6, 1977 (age 49); Fukuoka, Japan
- Genres: Enka; Kayōkyoku; Pop
- Occupation: Singer
- Years active: 2000–present
- Labels: Columbia Music Entertainment (2000–present)
- Website: Official(in Japanese)

Kiyoshi Hikawa (氷川 きよし, Hikawa Kiyoshi) or Stage name Kiina is a Japanese enka singer who was born on September 6, 1977, in Minami-ku, Fukuoka, Japan. His real name is Kiyoshi Yamada (山田 清志, Yamada Kiyoshi) and he is known as "The Prince of Enka" (演歌界の貴公子, Enkakai no Kikōshi) due to his young age and popularity. When he is marketing non-enka music, he goes by the name KIYOSHI, using capitalized letters of the Roman alphabet, instead of kanji or hiragana.

His record company is Columbia Music Entertainment, and his agency is Nagara Productions. He was given his stage name by Takeshi Kitano, who initially supported his career. Today, Hikawa makes frequent appearances on NHK Kayō Concert (NHK歌謡コンサート), as well as NHK's annual Kōhaku Uta Gassen.

== History ==
Hikawa was born on September 6, 1977, in Minami-ku, Fukuoka, Japan. As a high school student, Hikawa was a member of the school's performing arts club (芸能部, geinō-bu) and trained to be a singer after graduation from high school in 1995, Hikawa travelled to Tokyo, where he became an apprentice under the supervision of Hideo Mizumori. He served under Mizumori for three years.

In 2000, Hikawa made his professional debut with his single "Hakone Hachiri no Hanjirō."

Hikawa released the single "Hatsukoi Ressha" on February 9, 2005. It became his first number-one single on the Japanese Oricon weekly single charts. In 2006, he won the Grand Prix award for his song "Ikken" at the 48th Japan Record Awards. On February 4, 2009, he released the single "Rōkyōku Ichidai", his second number-one single on the Oricon weekly charts. On May 20, 2009, he released the album Enka Meikyoku Collection 10: Rōkyōku Ichidai, which debuted at No. 2 on the Oricon weekly album charts only behind Eminem's album Relapse. He released his second single of the year, "Tokimeki no Rumba", on August 19, 2009. The single debuted at No. 1 on the Oricon Weekly charts with first-week sales of about 68,000 copies, making him the first solo Enka singer to make three number-one singles in Oricon history. He released album Enka Meikyoku Collection 11: Tokimeki no Rumba on November 11, 2009.

At Jump Festa 2017, it was announced that Hikawa would sing his first anime theme song, which was Dragon Ball Super's second opening theme, "Genkai Toppa x Survivor". It was composed by Takafumi Iwasaki and the lyrics were written by Yukinojo Mori.

On January 21, 2022, Hikawa announced through his firm's website that he would temporarily suspend his singer activities from December 31, 2022.

== Characteristics ==
Hikawa is popular with young and old people alike. Although Enka is in a downward trend in Japan, Hikawa is responsible for popularizing Enka amongst the 20s demographic, who traditionally do not listen to it. Hikawa usually dresses in trendy casual clothes, sometimes appearing in the more traditional kimono normally worn by Enka singers.

Since 2019, Hikawa has begun dressing in both masculine and feminine fashion on-stage and off, coming out as "genderless" in 2020. That same year, he made history by performing on Kōhaku without being assigned to either the Red (female) or White (male) team.

== World-wide exposure ==
Hikawa has traveled worldwide, including to the United States. In 2003, they were the guest of honor at Hawaii's week-long Aloha Festival, where they participated in a parade with various Japan-based hula halau, and ended the week with a concert.

== Discography ==
- Enka Meikyoku Collection Ōi Okkake Otojirō: Seishunhen (2001)
- Enka Meikyoku Collection 2: Kiyoshi no Zundoko Bushi (2002)
- Ginga: Hoshizora no Akiko (2002)
- Enka Meikyoku Collection 3: Hakkun no Shiro (2003)
- Otokogi (2003)
- Enka Meikyoku Collection 4 Banba no Chūtarō (2004)
- Enka Meikyoku Collection 5 Hatsukoi Ressha (2005)
- Enka Jūniban Shōbu!: Omokoge no Miyako (2005)
- Enka Meikyoku Collection 6: Ikken (2006)
- Enka Meikyoku Collection 7: Abayo, Kiyoshi no Sōran Bushi (2007)
- Enka Meikyoku Collection 8: Genkai Funauta (2008)
- Enka Meikyoku Collection 9: Aishū no Mizuumi (2008)
- Enka Meikyoku Collection 10: Rōkyōku Ichidai (2009)
- Enka Meikyoku Collection 11: Tokimeki no Rumba (2009)
- Enka Meikyoku Collection 12: Shamisen Tabigarasu (2010)
- Enka Meikyoku Collection 13: Niji-iro no Bayon (2010)
- Enka Meikyoku Collection 14: Ano ko to Nogiku to Watashi Bune (2011)
- Enka Meikyoku Collection 15: Jōnetsu no Mariachi (2011)
- Enka Meikyoku Collection 16: Sakura (2012)
- Enka Meikyoku Collection 17: Saigo to Kimeta Hito Dakara (2012)
- Enka Meikyoku Collection 18: Shigure no Minato (2013)
- Enka Meikyoku Collection 19: Manten no Hitomi (2013)
- Hikawa Kiyoshi Shōwa no Enka Meikyokushū (2014)
- Enka Meikyoku Collection 20: Choi to Kimagure Wataridori (2014)
- Shin Enka Meikyoku Collection: Sasurai Bojō (2015)
- Shin Enka Meikyoku Collection 2: Itoshi no Te Quiero/Otokobana (2015)
- Shin Enka Meikyoku Collection 3: Miren Gokoro (2016)
- Shin Enka Meikyoku Collection 4: Kiyoshi no Nippon Zenkoku Utano Wataridori (2016)
- Shin Enka Meikyoku Collection 5: Otoko no Zekka (2017)
- Shin Enka Meikyoku Collection 6: Aoshi (2017)
- Shin Enka Meikyoku Collection 7: Shōbu no Hanamichi (2018)
- Shin Enka Meikyoku Collection 8: Fuyu no Pegasus Shōbu no Hanamichi: Orchestra (2018)
- Shin Enka Meikyoku Collection 9: Daijōbu/Mogami no Sendō (2019)
- Shin Enka Meikyoku Collection 10: Ryūshō Hōbu (2019)
- Papillon -Bohemian Rhapsody- (2020)
- Seisei Ruten (2020)
- Minamikaze Fukeba (2021)
- You Are You (2021)

== Filmography ==
- Everyone's Best Kouhaku 100th Anniversary of Broadcasting Special (NHK, 2025) (cast)

Preceded by Amika Hattan	Japan Record Award for Best New Artist; 2000	Succeeded by W-inds
