= CanCam =

Japanese fashion magazine

CanCam キャンキャン
- CanCam 25th anniversary issue, January 2007
- Editor-in-chief: Maki Ikame
- Categories: Fashion
- Frequency: Monthly
- Circulation: 615,002 (2014)
- Publisher: Shogakukan
- First issue: 23 November 1981
- Country: Japan
- Based in: Tokyo
- Language: Japanese
- Website: cancam.jp

CanCam (Japanese: キャンキャン, Hepburn: Kyankyan) is a Japanese monthly fashion magazine published by Shogakukan. Its name supposedly derives from "I Can Campus", because girls who read it are expected to become "campus leaders". The magazine was created for fashion-conscious consumers, and offers information on fashion, makeup, bags, accessories, and related topics. The magazine is targeted as a mote-kei (モテ系) fashion resource to novice office ladies as well as university students. The magazine has its headquarters in Tokyo.

== History ==
CanCam was first published in November of 1981 and has since grown to a circulation of more than 700,000 making it one of the single most popular magazines amid all 20-30 year old women. The magazine is about 600 pages each month and focuses on various models showcasing hundreds of new designs and outfits. In 2005 the Chinese version of CanCam was started. In March 2007 Shogakukan launched the sister magazine, AneCan, which is targeted at women in their mid- to late twenties. Model Moe Oshikiri left CanCam to become a regular for the magazine. In August 2008, it was announced that another of the magazine's popular models, Yuri Ebihara, would be "graduating" from the magazine and moving on to AneCan. Ebihara's last appearance in CanCam was the December 2008 issue. Oshikiri and Ebihara were previously part of the well-known CanCam trio with Yu Yamada.

== Exclusive models ==
=== Current ===
As of 22 November 2026:

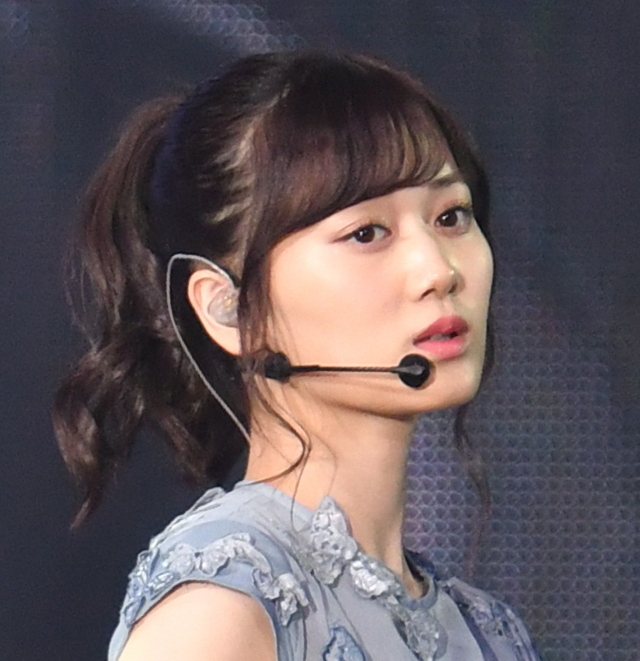
Mizuki Yamashita

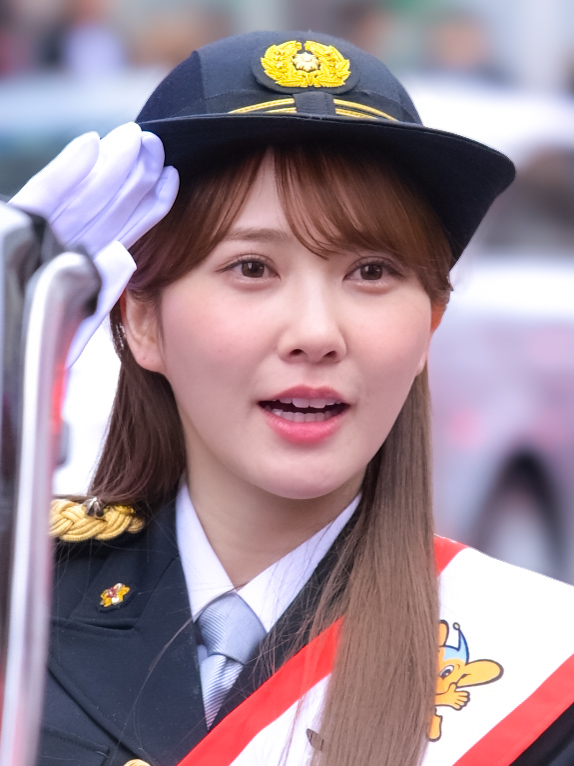
Shiho Katō

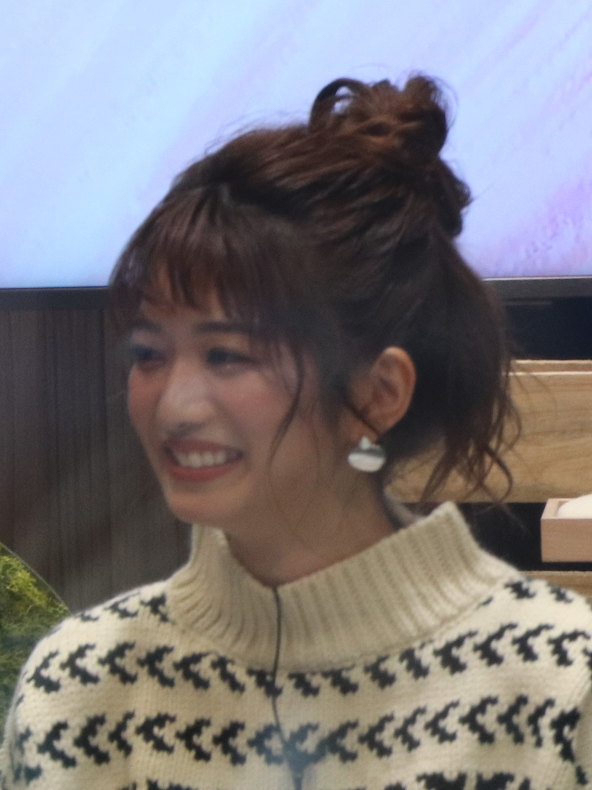
Ami Komuro

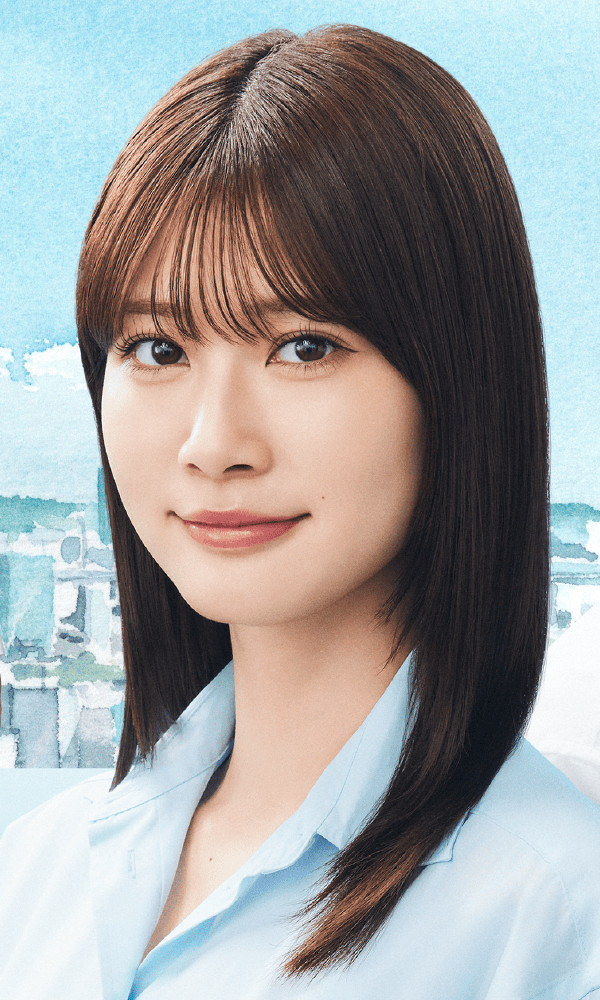
Meru Nukumi

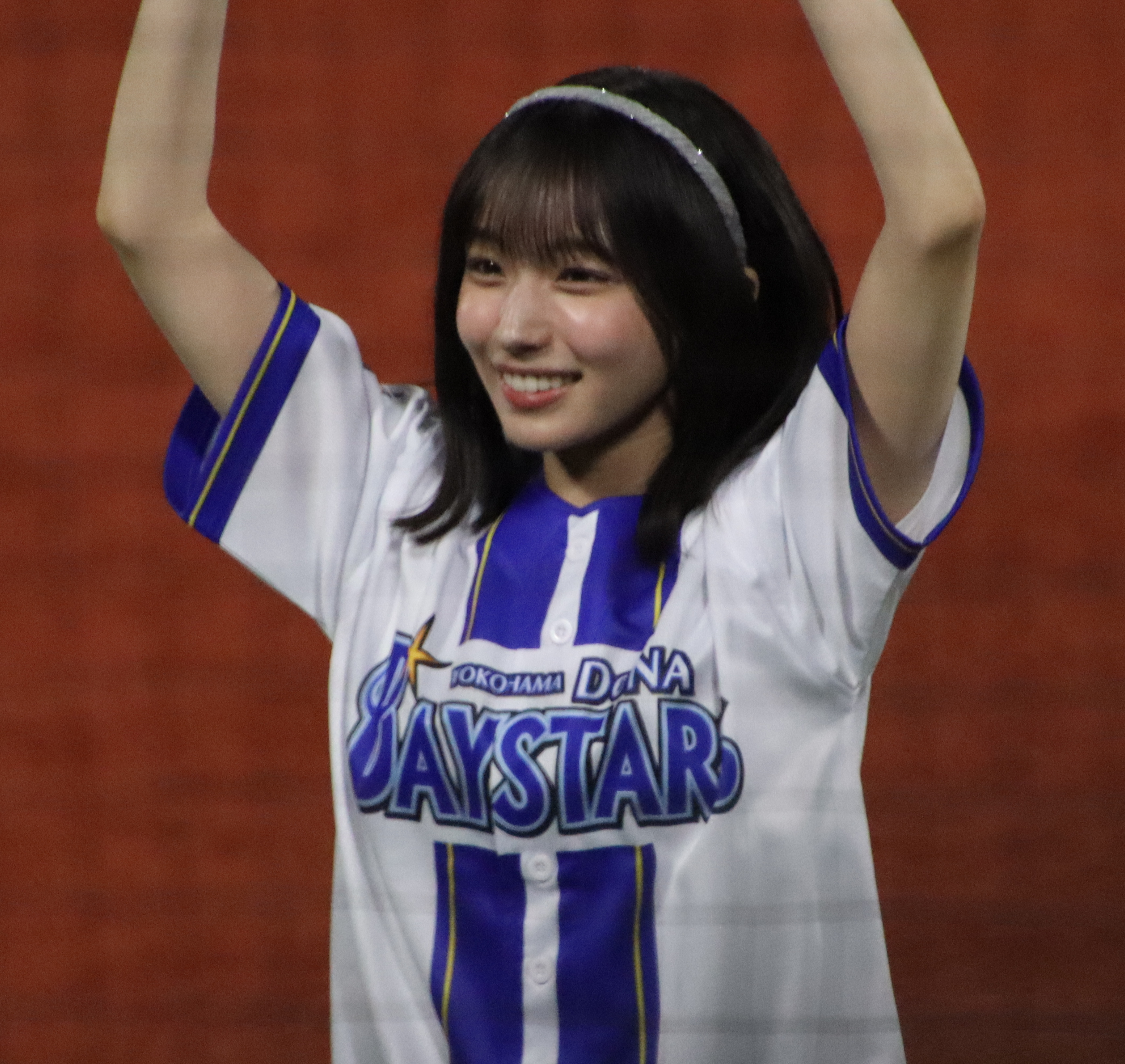
Manami Ōno

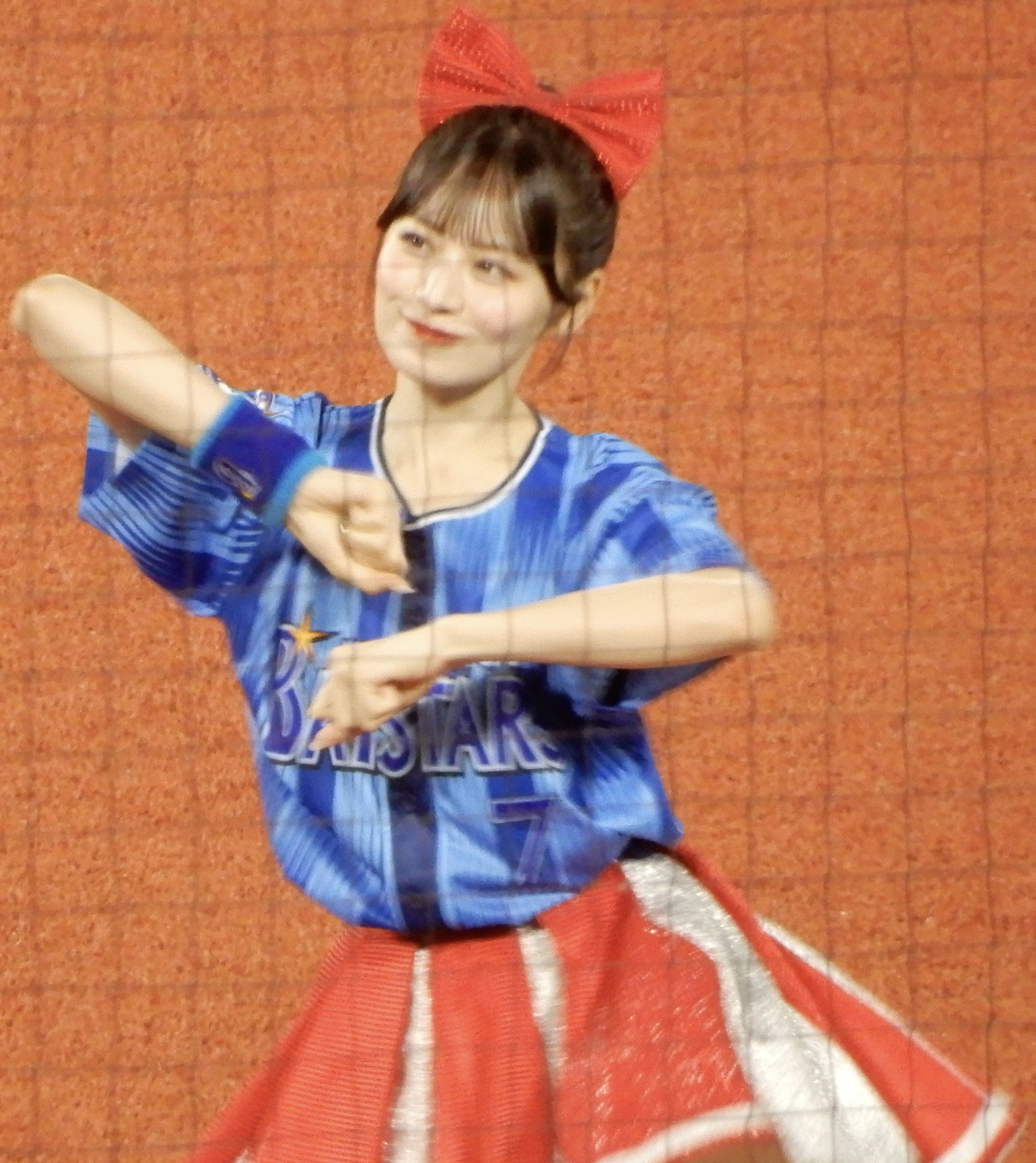
Kotomi Tachibana

Sakura Kawasaki

Several current CanCam exclusive models
- Mizuki Yamashita (former Nogizaka46)
- Shiho Katō (former Hinatazaka46)
- Ami Komuro
- Meru Nukumi
- Mizuho Shiromiya
- Ririka Tanabe
- Manami Ōno (Hinatazaka46)
- Kotomi Tachibana (Candy Tune)
- Sakura Kawasaki (Nogizaka46)

=== Past ===
- Elaiza Ikeda
- Aiku Maikawa
- Anna Kay
- Asami Ueda
- Atsuko Watanabe
- Ayumi Sakai
- Erika Mine
- Eriko Fujimoto
- Fumiyo Kashima
- Harumi Abe
- Hikari Mori
- Hiromi Kitagawa
- Hitomi Sawano
- Itsuko Onuki
- Junko Izumi
- Junko Miyashita
- Keiko Kon-no
- Kyōko Hasegawa
- Kyoko Kogiso
- Leena
- Maeko Yamagami
- Maimi Okuwa
- Maki Nishiyama
- Mari Inubushi
- Mariko Fujii
- Mariko Takada
- Maryjun Takahashi
- Mew Azama
- Miharu Hirayama
- Miki Akabane
- Misaki Ito
- Miwa Sakai
- Moe Oshikiri
- Naoko Tokuzawa
- Norika Fujiwara
- Noriko Sugawara
- Risa Tanaka
- Ryoko Yonekura
- Sachiko Kokubun
- Satoko Koizumi
- Shizuka Kondo
- Takako Maeda
- Toshie Kubo
- Yoko Horiuchi
- You Fujii
- Yu Yamada
- Yui Nakata
- Yuka Nanjo
- Yumiko Fujii
- Yumiko Watanabe
- Yuri Ebihara
- Yumi Higashino
- Koharu Kusumi
- Ayano Wakayama
- Hazuki Tsuchiya
- Nanami Hashimoto
- Ikumi Hisamatsu
- Mizuki Yamamoto
- Ayami Nakajo
- Rikako Sakata
- Naomi Trauden
- Yuki Sawa
- Akane Hotta
- Mai
- Sayuri Matsumura
- Ria Niinuma
- Rikako Sasaki (former Angerme)

== Gallery ==
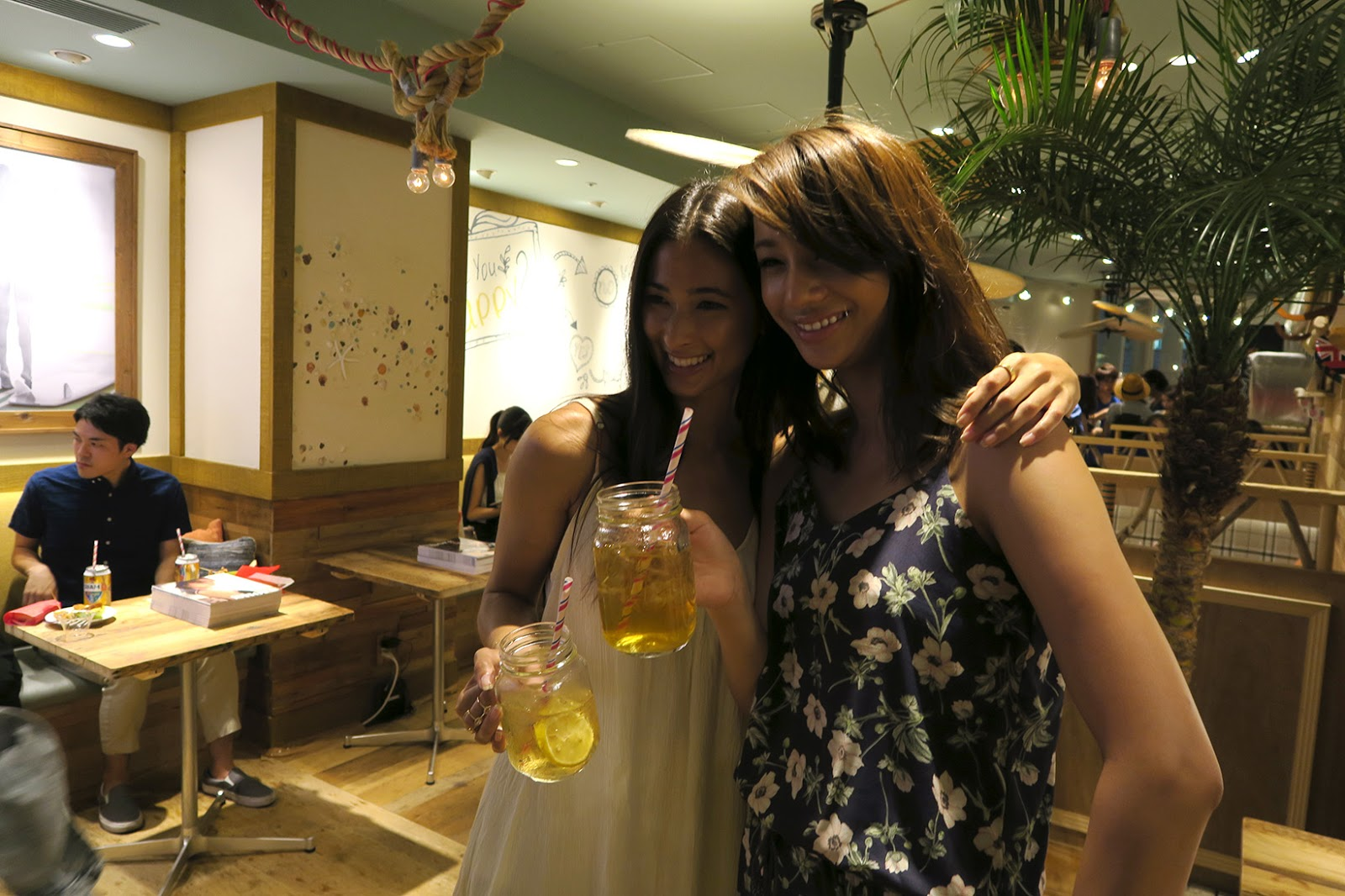
Maryjun Takahashi was one of its exclusive model from April 2004 to June 2012
