= Ikumi Hisamatsu =

Japanese fashion model and tarento

- 久松 郁実
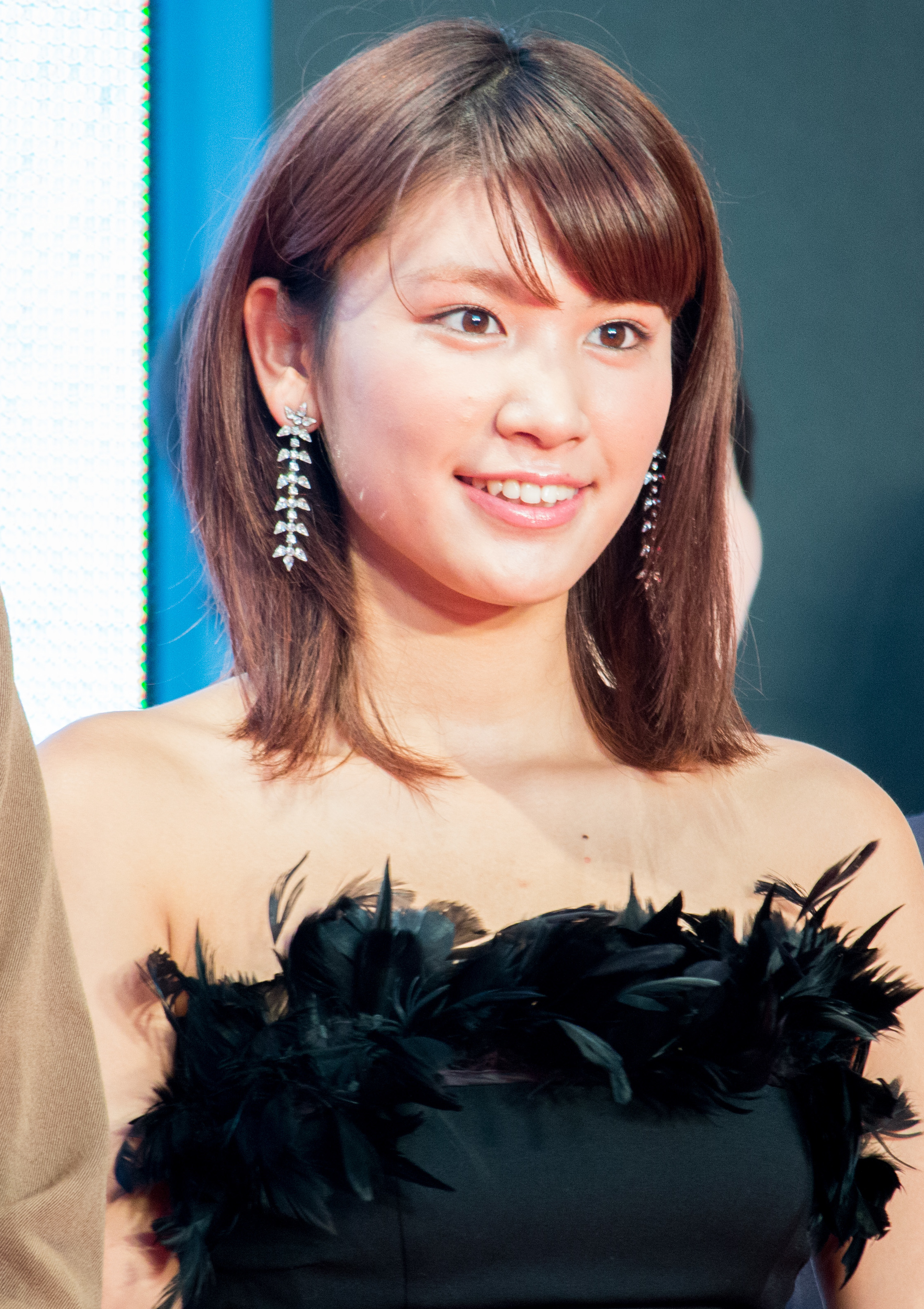
- Hisamatsu at the 28th Tokyo International Film Festival in 2015
- Born: 18 February 1996 (age 30); Tokyo, Japan
- Other names: Ikumin (いくみん)
- Occupations: Model; gravure idol; variety tarento; actress
- Years active: 2008–present
- Agent: Incent
- Height: 165 cm (5 ft 5 in)
- Spouse: Unknown (m. 2020)
- Children: 1

Ikumi Hisamatsu (久松 郁実, Hisamatsu Ikumi; born 18 February 1996) is a Japanese actress, fashion model, gravure idol, variety and tarento.

== Biography ==
Hisamatsu was born in Tokyo. After being scouted in Harajuku, she worked as an exclusive model for Hanachu in 2008.

Hisamatsu later became an exclusive model of CanCam starting with its October issue released in August 2012. In addition, she became member of Koi Miha that was formed in that issue.

In November 2013, Hisamatsu became the Sanai Swimsuit Image Girl of 2014.

She graduated from Nikaido High School from the Japan Women's College of Physical Education. In April 2014, Hisamatsu later entered Asia University School of Management.

In June 2021, Hisamatsu announced her marriage to an ordinary man in the fall of the previous year. On March 1, 2024, she gave birth to her first child, a baby girl.

== Filmography ==
=== Television ===
==== TV dramas ====
Year	Title	Role	Network	Ep.	Ref.
2012	13-Sai no Hello Work	Female high school student	TV Asahi	1	
2014	GTO	Yui Maeda	KTV		
2014	Saving My Stupid Youth	Rie Sakuma	TBS		
2016	Ushijima the Loan Shark Season 3	Erika	MBS		
2016	Love Love Alien	Chizuru Kasahara	Fuji TV		
2016	Cook Police Inspector's Dinner Party	Momo	TBS		
2017	Gaki☆Rock ~The Story of Kindness in Asakusa~	Kyoko	Amazon Prime		
2017	Detective Yugami	Kirara	Fuji TV	Episode 8	
2017	Love Love Alien 2	Chizu Kasahara	Fuji TV		
2017	Blazing Transfer Students	Swimsuit Model	Netflix	Episode 5	
2018	Kiss Shitai Matsuge	Yume Iiyama	dTV/FOD		
2018	Kareshi wo Ron de Kaimashita	Yume Iiyama	dTV/FOD		
2018	The Guide to Late Night Bad Love	Chiyo Fukuma	TV Asahi		

==== Variety ====
Year	Title	Network	Notes	Ref.
2009	Tokyo Kawaii TV	NHK-G		
2010	Kētai Gachi Chūgakusei no Honne o Kiite	NHK-E		
2011	N Com Magazine "Hamori-tai"	NHK-E	As Captain Hamori	
2012	Oto Ryūmon	NTV		
2013	Mezamashi TV	Fuji TV	"Imadoki", Imadoki Girl	
2014	Tsubokko	TBS		
2014	Down Town DX	YTV		
2014	Ponkotsu & Summers	TV Tokyo	Quasi-regular, Ponkotsu Girl	
2015	Sunday Japon	TBS		
2015	Emi Kamisama wa Totsuzen ni...	NTV		
2015	Nakai no Mado	NTV		
2015	Goddotan	TV Tokyo		
2015	Kon'no, Ima kara Odoru tte yo	TV Tokyo		
2015	Summer Girls in Nanana Beach	TV Tokyo	MC with Miwako Kakei and Monica Sahara	
2015	Suiyōbi no Downtown	TBS		
2015	Birdman Rally 2015	YTV		
2015	Pre-Batt!	MBS		
2015	IQ Venus: Tensai JK Nihon Ichi Kettei-sen	TV Tokyo		
2016	Ikumi Hisamatsu: Hatachi made ni Shitai koto	BS Fuji		
2016	Love Gol	Sun TV	Regular	
2016	Bi Muscle on the Beach -Ī Onna o tsukuru Natsu 2016-	TV Tokyo	MC with Keisuke Okada and Aya Asahina	
2016	Hashimoto × Hatori no Bangumi	TV Asahi	In the audience	
2017	Ikumi Hisamatsu: Tabi iku'! in New Caledonia	BS Fuji		
2017	Densha & Bus de Iku! Sōshun no Izuhantō sugo ro ku no Tabi	TV Tokyo		
2017	Odoru! Sanma Goden!!	NTV	(Note: She published a high school in the same programme.)	

=== Radio ===
Year	Title	Network	Notes
2016	Appare yatte māsu!	MBS Radio	Tuesday Regular

=== Advertisements ===
Year	Title	Brand	Co-star
2015	Mikkuchujūchu	Sangaria	Hidekazu Akai (inventor)

=== Films ===
Year	Title	Role	Ref.
2009	Keitai Kareshi	Kazue Minakuchi	
2015	Ao Oni ver. 2.0	Mika	
2015	Tokyo PR Woman	Saki Mitamura	
2016	Sakurano Ame	Ruhu Mizuki	
2016	Shiratori Reiko de Gozaimasu!	Rumi Masuda	
2016	Mogura no Uta	Chillin	

=== Internet programmes ===
Year	Title	Role
2010	NTT DoCoMo Keitai Drama "Ato Mōippo: Mugen Loop Jukensei"	Erika Kurosawa
2015	Meiji "Chichi Tanpakushitsu-kei Variety 'Iku Milpro TV'"	MC Ikumi

=== Catalogues ===
Year	Title	Publisher
2009	Petit Berry	Nissen
2010	Nakayoshi Kyōwakoku	Nissen

=== Others ===
Year	Title
2013	2014 Sanai Swimsuit Image Girl
2016	Tokyo Metropolitan Police Department Agency Association "The National Regional Safety Campaign in Heisei 28"

== Bibliography ==
=== Magazine serialisations ===
Year	Title	Publisher	Notes
2008	Hanachu	Shufu no Tomo	Exclusive model
2012	CanCam	Shogakukan	Exclusive model
