= Patrick Harlan =

American-Japanese television presenter

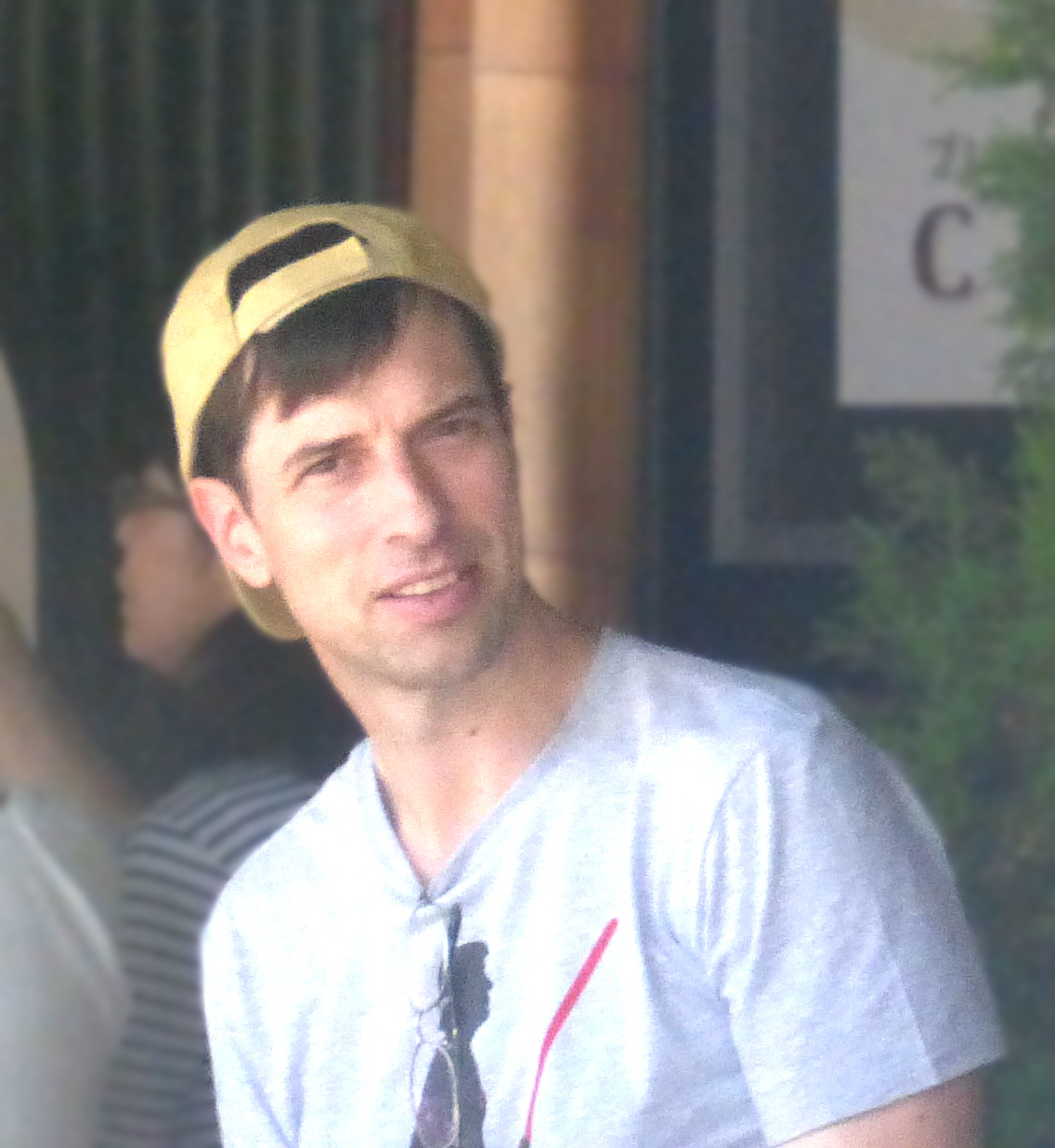
- in 2017
- Born: November 14, 1970 (age 55); Colorado, U.S.
- Occupations: Comedian; TV personality; voice actor
- Years active: 1996–present

Patrick Harlan (born November 14, 1970) is an American-born Japanese entertainer, comedian, and voice actor. He is known for being a member of the comedy duo Pack'n Mack'n (パックンマックン, Pakkun Makkun), and is also known by his stage name Pakkun (パックン).

== Life and career ==
Harlan was born in Colorado, and graduated from Harvard University with a degree in the Comparative Study of Religion. He first came to Japan on a tour with the Harvard Glee Club in 1993. He lived in Fukui and taught at an English conversation school. He studied Japanese on his own, and passed the highest level of the Japanese Language Proficiency Test after 2 years in the country. He moved to Tokyo in 1996 to pursue an acting career.

In 1997, Harlan and Makoto Yoshida formed the comic duo Pack'n Mack'n, with Harlan as the boke (funny guy) and Yoshida as the tsukkomi (straightman). They were the first international pair on the Japanese comedy scene in decades. They quickly made a name for themselves, winning the Tokyo FM King of Comedy Tournament and making it to the finals of NHK's Shinjin Engei Taisho both in 1999. They were also finalists on NHK's Bakusho Onair Battle in 2000. Pack'n Mack'n became a regular face on Japanese television, with a daily corner on the popular afternoon show Just on TBS for five and a half years. Pack'n Mack'n took their Manzai style to Las Vegas in 2004 and Los Angeles in 2007, performing both times in English with their straight man and funny guy roles reversed.

In addition to comedy, Harlan works as an actor, DJ, commentator, and TV show host. As a solo performer, Patrick became well known as the host of NHK's Eigo de Shabera Night, and later the secondary host or "Friday Partner" of Nihon Television's Omoikkiri Ii Terebi with Mino Monta. From 2010 to 2014, Harlan was the main MC of 7Sta Bratch and 7Sta Live on TV Tokyo. In the 2010s, Harlan began commenting on news and current events, and in 2015 became the moderator of "GAIKOKUJIN KISHAHA MITA (Through Foreign Journalists' Eyes)", a weekly current affairs discussion program on BS-TBS television. He was the anchor of Fuji Television's Hodo Prime Sunday in 2018, and the Wednesday night anchor for Abema Prime from 2015 to 2019. Since 2012, he has been an adjunct professor at Tokyo Institute of Technology teaching courses in Communication and Rhetoric and International Relations Theory.

Harlan was chosen as the most likeable commentator on TV in Japan in a 2017 online survey of 29,147 people, and the commentator with the "best personality" in a 2023 survey of 200 television directors and producers.

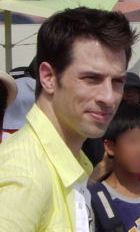
Patrick Harlan at Expo 2005

== Television ==
- Corner personality on "Just", TBS Television, 1999–2005
- Host of "Eigo de Shabera Night", NHK, 2003–2009
- Secondary host of "Omoikkiri ii!! Terebi", Nippon Television, 2007–2009
- Host of "7Sta Live" and 7Sta Bratch", TV Tokyo, 2010–2014
- Panelist on "Ima Sekai Wa", Nippon Television, 2012–
- Co-host of "Rika's Tokyo Cuisine" segment of "Dining with the Chef", NHK, 2013–
- Host of "Through Foreign Journalists' Eyes: Nippon in the World", BS-TBS, 2015–2018

== Voice work ==
- Jack Morton in Gamera 2000 (1997)
- Pirate in Doraemon: Nobita's Great Adventure in the South Seas (1998)
- Deep Freeze (1999)
- Robert Wells in Shenmue (2000)
- Ark Thompson in Resident Evil Survivor (2000)
- Silpheed: The Lost Planet (2000)
- Steel Battalion (2002)
- Hero in D.N.A.: Dark Native Apostle (2002)
- Monkey Voice in Super Monkey Ball 2 (2002) (Note: The game did not credit specific Monkey roles and Patrick confirmed he did not voice the narrator. The narrator was voiced by Brian Matt, another American voice actor in Japan.)
- Narrator in Little Charo: Tohoku-hen
- David Rice in Neuro: Supernatural Detective (ep. 14; 2008)
- Jack Waltz in Detective Conan: Dimensional Sniper (2014)

== Books ==
- 爆笑問題・パックンの英語原論 (Bakusho Mondai and Pack'n Tackle English (full edition)), Gentosha, 2001
- 爆笑問題・パックンのニュースで英語を学ぶ本 (Bakusho Mondai and Pakkun Learn English from the News), Gentosha, 2002
- パックンマックンの笑われる英語 笑わせる英語 (Pakkun Makkun's English to Get Laughed At, English to Get A Laugh), Seishun Shuppan, 2002
- 小卒レベルのおれがラスベガスで英語で漫才ができた理由 (How I, With Grade School Level English, Came to Perform MANZAI in English in Las Vegas), Gentosha, 2004
- Pakkun's English Dictionary, Gakushu Kenkyusha, 2004
- 爆笑問題・パックンの読むだけで英語がわかる本 (Bakusho Mondai and Pakkun Tackle English (revised)), Gentosha, 2005
- パックンマックンの「使いこなせ! カタカナ語」ビジネス編 仕事で役立つ頻出300語マスター (Pakkun Makkun's Useful Katakana English for Business), Shogakukan, 2006
- パックンの英語絵本「トゥースフェアリーの大冒険」 (The Tooth Fairy's Big Adventure (picture book. text and illustration by Patrick Harlan)), Shogakukan, 2006
- パックンの中吊り英作文 (Pakkun's Headline English), CNN Publishing, 2006
- 「何とぞよしなに」って、英語で言えますか (Let's Talk Business), NHK出版、2012
- Are you a 国際人 ("Are you an International Person"), Chuoseihan, 2013
- パックンマックン・海保知里の笑う英作文 (Pakkun Makkun and Chisato Kaiho's Laughable English Composition), Fusosha, 2013
- TSUKAMU ! WAJUTSU (Speak to Achieve) Kadokawa 21, 2014
- 大統領の演説 (The Presidents' Speech), Kadokawa, 2016
- 世界に通じる子を育てる (Raising Kids who Meet the World), Daiwa Shobo, 2017
- 世界に渡り合う外交術 (Diplomacy to Cross the World), Mainichi Shinbun Publishing, 2017
- 日本のバイアスを外せ (Removing the Japan Bias), Shogakukan, 2018
- 逆境力 (The Power of Adversity), SB Shinsho, 2021
- パックン式お金の育て方 (Growing Your Money Pakkun-style), 2022
