= Yuri Ebihara =

Japanese model and actress

- 蛯原 友里
- Born: 3 October 1979 (age 47); Miyazaki Prefecture, Japan
- Education: Kyushu Sangyo University (B.F.A)
- Occupations: Model; actress
- Years active: 2002–present
- Spouse: Keisuke Ogihara (m. 2010)
- Children: 2
- Modeling information
- Height: 1.68 m (5 ft 6 in)
- Hair color: Black
- Eye color: Brown
- Agency: Kirahat
- Website: yuriebihara.com

Yuri Ebihara (蛯原 友里, Ebihara Yuri) (born 3 October 1979) is a Japanese model and actress. She is a graduate of Kyushu Sangyo University, where she studied fine arts.

== History ==
Her first big break came as a model for CanCam, with whom she had an exclusive contract. She has since appeared in several TV dramas, including Tokumei Kakarichō Tadano Hitoshi (TV Asahi, 2007).

Widely known by her nickname "Ebi-chan", she is especially popular with young men and women. She has been quoted as saying, "If someone doesn't find me cute, I want to know why, because then I'll work on it to get better at being cute".

Since 2009, she has been an exclusive model for twenties female fashion magazine AneCan. She also appeared on the fashion magazine Domani targeted thirties as an exclusive model starting with the July 2015 issue.

== Personal life ==
Ebihara has a younger twin sister, Eri (ja), as well as a younger brother. In May 2010, Ebihara announced that she had married Ilmari from the music group Rip Slyme. Their son was born in 2015, and daughter in 2021.

== Appearances ==
=== Films ===
- Tokumei Kachō Tadano Hitoshi Saigo no Gekijōban (2008)

=== TV dramas ===
- Tokumei Kakarichō Tadano Hitoshi (TV Asahi, 2003), Kazue Yamabuki
- Salary Man Kintarō 4 (TBS, 2004), Masami Aikawa
- Slow Dance (Fuji TV, 2005), Yukie Sonoda
- Woman's Island: Kanojotachi no Sentaku (NTV, 2006)
- Busu no Hitomi ni Koishiteru (Fuji TV, 2006), Yumi Ebihara
- Oniyome Nikki Īyu Dana (Fuji TV, 2007)
- Doukyūsei: Hito wa, Sando, Koi o Suru (TBS, 2014), herself

== Bibliography ==
=== Magazines ===
- CanCam, Shogakukan 1982-, as an exclusive model from 2003 to 2008
- AneCan, Shogakukan 2007-, as an exclusive model from 2009 to 2016
- Domani, Shogakukan 1997-, as an exclusive model since 2015

=== Photobooks ===
- EBI01 (Shogakukan, 1 October 2011) ISBN 9784091036254
