= Kigurumi (band) =

Japanese pop group

- Origin: Japan
- Genres: J-pop
- Years active: 2006–present
- Label: Victor Entertainment
- Members: Miki; Kei
- Past members: Rena; Haruka
- Website: http://www.kigurumi777.com/

Kigurumi (キグルミ) is a Japanese music group that debuted in 2006 under Victor Entertainment. The group was founded by Rena Shimura and Haruka, and two new members, Miki and Kei, joined the band in 2007. Rena and Haruka later left the group to become actresses.

== History ==
In June 2006, Kewpie was looking for a duet of two girls to perform the song "Tarako Tarako Tarako" for its Tarako Pasta Sauce commercial. Auditions were held, and the parts were given to Rena Shimura and Haruka. The band was named after the Japanese art of cosplay, and was named with the theory that the costumes could easily change with the concept of the song.

The band's first single, "Tarako Tarako Tarako", reached #2 on the Oricon singles list and spent 26 weeks on the list overall. At the age of 10 1/2 years, Haruka was the youngest person in history to reach that high on the charts. Later that year a special version of the song, "Tarako Tarako Tarako Christmas", was released on DVD.

After the release of the song "Kurutto Mawatte Ikkaiten/Danshingu Shisutā" in 2007, Haruka left the band. Rena remained in the band, but on July 13, 2007, a temporary band consisting of Rena and Michiko Shimizu, Kigurumichiko, formed to perform the song "Hottottotto na Mainichi", which was used as the 5th anniversary ending for the show "Atashin'chi".

On September 7, 2007, Kigurumi was asked to perform the song "Tamagotchi" for the upcoming movie "Tamagotchi: The Movie", but the song required a trio. Auditions were held, and on November 7, 2007, two new members, Miki and Kei, joined the band. Together, they released the album "Tamagotchi". The band also sang the end song for the film, "Chiisana Hoshi No Youni".

On April 25, 2008, Rena left the band.

== Discography ==
=== Albums ===
- Kigurumi (キグルミ) (2007)
- Kigurumi no Kodomo no Uta (キグルミのこどものうた) (2008)
- Kigurumi tamagotchi

=== Download ===
- Minna de! Sansū 99-tai (みんなで！ さんすう 99隊) (2007)
- Tamagotchi (Rena Version) 1-ban (たまごっち（レナヴァージョン）1番) (2007)
- Winter Wonderland (2008)

=== DVD ===
- Tarako Tarako Tarako Tappuri Christmas Box (たらこ・たらこ・たらこ たっぷりクリスマスBOX) (2006)

=== Singles ===
- Tarako Tarako Tarako (たらこ・たらこ・たらこ) (2006)
- Kurutto Mawatte Ikkaiten/Dancing Sister (くるっと・まわって・いっかいてん/ダンシング・シスター) (2007)
- Hottottotto na Mainichi (ほっとっとっとな まいにち) (2007)
- Tamagotchi (たまごっち) (2007)
- Tamagotchi Happy Version (たまごっち ハッピーヴァージョン) (2008)

== TV appearances ==
- 愛のエプロン (Ai no EPURON; Love's Apron) March 7, 2007
- うたばん (Utaban; Popular Songs) June 14, 2007
- 踊る踊る!さんま御殿お笑い怪獣大行進SP(Odoru Odoru! Sanma Goten Owarai Kaijū Daikōshin SP; Dance Dance! Palace of Big Funny Monster Parades SP) November 28, 2006
- 行列のできる法律相談所 (Gyōretsu no Dekiru Hōritsusōdantokoro; Line to the Law Center) December 10, 2006
- くりぃむしちゅーのたりらリでイキます!! ('Kurī Mushichū no Tarirari de IKImasu!!') January 25, 2007
- 第35回記念FNS歌謡祭2006 (Dai 35-kai Kinen FNS Kayōsai; FNS 35th Anniversary Song Festival 2006) December 6, 2006
- 第48回日本レコード大賞 (Dai 48-kai NihonREKŌDOtaishō; 48th Annual Japan Record Awards) December 30, 2006
- みんなで!さんすう99隊 (Minna de! Sansū 99:-dai; Together! Arithmic Squadron 99) January 22, 2007 (As singers)
  - Song download was only available on the website "DOGATCH" from 1/29/2007-3/31/2007
- めざましどようび (Mezamashi Doyōbi; Saturday Alarm Clock)
  - September 10, 2006 ("OH!WAKU 50"コーナー (OH! WAKU 50 corner)
  - April 7, 2007 (ダンシング・シスター [Dancing Sister] *voices in a song*. Sponsored by the Nickelodeon Kid's Choice Awards; The duo was unable to appear at the KCA, due to Haruka's passport expiring.)
  - June 2, 2007 (エンタのタマテ箱 (ENTA no TAMATE Hako; The Enterprises' Tamate Case) and エンタ ガラ×2 ポン！(ENTA GARAx2 PON; Gala Enterprise x2 Bong) corners
  - June 30, 2007 (Last appearance of Haruka in Kigurumi)
- 森田一義アワー 笑っていいとも! (Morita Kazuyoshi AWĀ Waratte Ītomo!; The Kazuyoshi Morita Hour with a Good Laugh!) September 18, 2006 (チビッコ一芸広場 [CHIBIKKŌ Gē Hirobi; Young Child Art Plaza] Corner)
- ケロロ軍曹 (KERORO Gunsō; Sergeant Keroro) 4/7/2007-7/7/2007 (Ending Song)
- ズームイン!!SUPER ズームSUPERステージ (ZŪMUIN!! SUPER ZŪMU SUPER SUTĒJI; Zoom In! Super Zoom Super Stage!) October 8, 2006
- ポンキッキ (PONKIKKI) As singers for the song "Kyō wa MedeTAI (Today is a Happy Day)" from January 2007-March 30, 2007
- ミュージックステーション (MYŪJIKKU SUTĒSHON; Music Station) September 8, 2006; October 20, 2006; December 22, 2006; January 12, 2007
  - December 22, 2006 - Became the youngest performers on "Super Music Station Live"
  - On New Year's Eve 2006, this show broadcast a 2-hour long broadcast of Kigurumi live.
- HEY! HEY! HEY! MUSIC CHAMP- November 7, 2006
