= Risa Watanabe =

Japanese former singer and model (born 1998)

- 渡邉 理佐
- Born: 27 July 1998 (age 28); Ibaraki Prefecture, Japan
- Other names: Berisa, Ricchan, Risa
- Occupation: Fashion model
- Years active: 2015–2025
- Agent: Seed & Flower
- Modeling information
- Height: 167 cm (5 ft 6 in)
- Hair color: brown
- Eye color: black
- Musical career
- Genre: J-pop
- Years active: 2015–2022
- Formerly of: Sakurazaka46
- Website: Official website

Risa Watanabe (渡邉 理佐, Watanabe Risa; born 27 July 1998) is a former Japanese fashion model and former idol. She was an exclusive model for the women's magazine non-no and a former member of the female Japanese idol group Sakurazaka46.

== Biography ==
On August 21, 2015, Watanabe passed the audition for Keyakizaka46 (now Sakurazaka46) and entered the entertainment industry. She was part of the subgroup Aozora to Marry (青空とMARRY) along with Rika Watanabe, Akane Moriya, Yūka Sugai and Manaka Shida. As part of the subunit, Watanabe made appearances in three songs: "Aozora ga Chigau" from Sekai ni wa Ai Shika Nai, "Wareta Sumaho" from Fukyōwaon, and "Namiuchigiwa o Hashiranai ka?" from Kaze ni Fukarete mo.

On October 8, 2016, she made her runway debut at the fashion and music event Girls Award 2016 Autumn/Winter, held at the Yoyogi National Gymnasium.

On March 21, 2017, Watanabe attended the founding 45th anniversary event of the female fashion magazine Non-no, it was announced that she will be the magazine's exclusive model along with Nanaka Matsukawa and Aina Yamada. Watanabe became the first to serve as a magazine exclusive model from Keyakizaka46.

On January 24, 2022, she announced that she will graduate from Sakurazaka46 following the end of promotional activities for the group's 4th single.

Watanabe continued to be managed by Seed & Flower, Keyakizaka46's management company, as a solo talent. She left the agency in February 2025.

== Personal life ==
She is nicknamed Berisa (ベリサ), Risa (りさ), Ricchan (りっちゃん), and Risa-sama (理佐様).

Risa revealed that one of her friends told her about Toriizaka46 audition so she went with the flow simply because she could and did it with half-hearted feelings at first, not really expecting to pass the first phase of the audition. She had long hair upon joining Keyakizaka46, but before making her debut, her hair was cut by 10 cm or more to make it shorter.

As a child, she has a boyish haircut and she also claimed to only imitate what her older brother does.

She also revealed that she was able to obediently attend her Shichi-Go-San when she was 3 years old however, she refused to go due to her dislike of wearing kimono and being photographed when she was 7 years old. During her junior high school years she joined the volleyball club. Once in high school, she had said to have started dieting by eating bean sprouts she brings to school as substitute for school lunch.

Risa is close with the Japanese actress-model, Yuko Araki.

Among the members, she is close with the Rika Watanabe who comes from the same prefecture and is called W-Watanabe or BeriBeri (べりべり) by their fans. It is also notable that she is the closest with the now former member, Manaka Shida, as all other members including Keyakitte, Kakenai? MC, Teruyuki Tsuchida, have mentioned that the two are always together. They were known as one of the famous pairs in the group, dubbed as Za Kuuru or The COOL (ザ・クール), ShidaRisa (志田理佐), and MonaRisa (モナリサ).

=== Hobbies ===
Watanabe's hobby is shopping. She mentioned her love for looking at transit maps of Japan.

=== Skills ===
Her special skills are playing rock–paper–scissors using both hands with the right hand always beating the left hand, riding the unicycle, and using a hula hoop.

It is notable that Risa's athletic skills are among the top of their group. Her 115 cm high jump was recorded as the best during the athletic ability test, her 26m softball putting was just second to Shida Manaka who had 30.5m record, and her 50-meter running record being 7.91 seconds during Kanji's sports battle against Hiragana.

Watanabe is also confident of her culinary skills. She likes cooking omurice and knows how to make sweets.

== Discography ==
=== Singles ===
Keyakizaka46

Year	Title	EAN
2016	Silent Majority	EAN 4988009125930
2016	Te o Tsunaide Kaerou ka	EAN 4988009125930
2016	Kimigainai	EAN 4988009125954
2016	Sekai ni wa Ai Shika Nai	EAN 4988009130804
2016	Kataru nara Mirai wo...	EAN 4988009130804
2016	Aozora ga Chigau	EAN 4988009130835
2016	Futari Saison	EAN 4547366279399
2016	Otona wa Shinjite Kurenai	EAN 4547366279399
2016	Seifuku to Taiyou	EAN 4547366279375
2016	Bokutachi no Sensou	EAN 4547366279399
2017	Fukyōwaon	EAN 4547366301274
2017	W-Keyakizaka no Uta	EAN 4547366301274
2017	Wareta Smartphone	EAN 4547366301274
2017	Eccentric	EAN 4547366301298
2017	Kaze ni Fukarete mo	
2017	Hiraishin	
2017	Namiuchigiwa o Hashiranai ka	
2018	Garasu wo Ware	
2018	Mou Mori e Kaerou ka	
2018	Ambivalent	
2018	Student Dance	
2018	I'm Out	
2019	Kuroi Hitsuji	
2019	Nobody	
2020	Dare ga Sono Kane o Narasu no ka?	

==== Sakurazaka46 ====
Year	Title	EAN
2020	Nobody's Fault	
2020	Naze Koi o Shite Konakattan darō?	
2020	Hanshinhangi	
2020	Plastic Regret	
2020	Buddies	
2020	Blue Moon Kiss	
2021	Ban	
2021	Guuzen no Kotae	
2021	Sore ga Ai Nano ne	
2021	Kimi to Boku to Sentakumono	
2021	Microscope	
2021	Omotta Yori Mo Sabishikunai	
2021	Sakurazaka no Uta	
2021	Nagaredama	
2021	Dead End	
2021	Mugon no Uchū	
2021	Utsukushiki Nervous	

Sakamichi AKB

Year	Title	EAN	Ref.
2017	Dare no Koto wo Ichiban Aishiteru?	EAN 4988003500702	
2018	Kokkyo no Nai Jidai		

=== Videos ===
Year	Title	EAN
2016	Risa Watanabe	EAN 4988009125930
2016	Risa Watanabe	EAN 4988009130804
2016	Risa Watanabe	EAN 4547366279399
2017	KeyaBingo!	EAN 4988021715010
2017	Tokuyama Daigorō o Dare ga Koroshita ka?	EAN 4517331036388
2017	Risa Watanabe	EAN 4547366301274

== Filmography ==
=== Events ===
Year	Title	Ref.
2016	Girls Award 2016 Autumn/Winter	
2017	Tokyo Girls Collection 2017 Spring/Summer	
2017	Girls Award 2017 Autumn/Winter	
2017	Tokyo Girls Collection 2017 Autumn/Winter	
2017	Tokyo Girls Collection Hiroshima 2017	
2018	Tokyo Girls Collection 2018 Spring/Summer	
2018	Girls Award 2018 Spring/Summer	
2018	Girls Award 2018 Autumn/Winter	
2019	Tokyo Girls Collection Shizuoka 2019	
2019	Tokyo Girls Collection 2019 Spring/Summer	
2019	Tokyo Girls Collection Kumamoto 2019	

=== Stage ===
Year	Title	Role	Ref.
2025	The Quintessential Quintuplets	Miku Nakano	

== Bibliography ==
=== Magazine Serializations ===
Title	Ref.
non-no	

=== Photobook Release ===
On February 4, 2019, it was announced that Risa Watanabe will release her first photo collection. She became the sixth member in Keyakizaka46 to have a photobook, behind Rika Watanabe, Neru Nagahama, Yūka Sugai, Yui Imaizumi, and Yui Kobayashi.

Title	First week sales	Reference
無口 (Taciturn)	73,388	
