= Yūka Sugai =

Japanese television personality, actress, and radio personality (born 1995)

- 菅井 友香
- Born: November 29, 1995 (age 30); Tokyo, Japan
- Occupations: Television personality; actress; radio personality
- Years active: 2015–present
- Agent: Top Coat
- Title: Special Ambassador, Japan Equestrian Federation (2017–2021)
- Awards: 2nd place, 28th Japan Junior Dressage Equestrian Tournament
- Musical career
- Genres: J-pop
- Years active: 2015–2022
- Label: Sony Music Entertainment Japan
- Formerly of: Sakurazaka46

Yūka Sugai (Japanese: 菅井 友香) is a Japanese television personality, actress, and radio personality. She is a former member and captain of girl group Sakurazaka46 (formerly Keyakizaka46). Her background in competitive equestrianism forms a major part of her public persona.

== Early life ==
Sugai was born on November 29, 1995, in Tokyo, Japan. As a child, she had 11 years of ballet experience. She started horseback riding in 5th grade and won numerous awards in various junior national competitions, particularly in dressage.

=== Awards ===
The table below lists Sugai's top three finishes in equestrian competitions recognized by the Japan Equestrian Federation.

Year	Event	Competition	Place	Horse name
2011	28th Tokyo Horse Show	Children rider	1st	Wolphram
2011	28th Japan Junior Dressage Equestrian Tournament	Children rider	2nd	Wolphram
2013	40th Tokyo Metropolitan Equestrian Competition	M1 Section	1st	Wolphram

== Career ==
=== 2015–2022: Sakurazaka46 ===
On August 21, 2015, Sugai along with 22 other members were introduced as members of a new girl group under Sony Music Entertainment Japan named Toriizaka46, renamed shortly after into Keyakizaka46 and again into Sakurazaka46 in 2020. Her nicknames include Yukka (ゆっかー) and Sugai-sama (菅井様), the latter referring to her "wealthy young lady" (お嬢様, ojō-sama) persona, which was heavily influenced by her horseback riding experience.

Sugai made her musical debut with Keyakizaka46's first single, Silent Majority. As of February 2019, she has participated in all eight of Keyakizaka46's singles. She is also part of the subgroup Aozora to Marry (青空とMARRY) along with Risa Watanabe, Akane Moriya, Manaka Shida, and Rika Watanabe. As part of the subunit, Sugai made center appearances in three songs: "Aozora Chigau" in "Sekai ni wa Ai Shika Nai", "Wareta Sumaho" in "Fukyōwaon, and "Namiuchigiwa o Hashiranai ka?" in "Kaze ni Fukarete mo". Additionally, Sugai made two song appearances as part of Sakamichi AKB (坂道AKB), a group made of various AKB48 and Sakamichi members. She will also be included in Sakamichi AKB's next song.

Sugai was named the captain of Keyakizaka46 on January 21, 2017, with Akane Moriya as vice captain. She also became the Special Ambassador for the Japan Equestrian Federation the same year in order to broaden the appeal of the sport, and held the position until the end of 2021.

On April 11, 2018, Kodansha announced that they will be publishing a photo-book featuring Sugai that was photographed in Paris. She became the fourth member in Keyakizaka46 to have a photobook, after Neru Nagahama, Yui Imaizumi, and Rika Watanabe. The photo-book, titled Fiancé (フィアンセ), was the bestselling photo-book in Japan for three weeks in a row.

On August 22, 2022, Sugai announced that she would be leaving Sakurazaka46 after the Tokyo Dome performances on November 8 and 9, the final leg of the national tour that would begin in September that year. Second generation member Rina Matsuda succeeded her as captain.

=== 2022–present: Solo career ===
Sugai's first post-Sakurazaka46 activity was an acting role in the stage play Neo Bakumatsu Junjoden, which ran from January 28 to February 19, 2023.

On February 12, 2023, Sugai both launched her official website and was announced as a host for the horseback racing program Keiba Beat. Her first self-titled radio program, Yūka Sugai's #KyouMoOshiToGanbariki (菅井友香の#今日も推しとがんばりき; transl. Today, I'll Also Do My Best with My Favorite), started airing on March 30.

On November 15, 2023, it was announced that Sugai would play the lead role of Itsuki Harumoto in the upcoming drama Chaser Game W Pawahara Jōshi wa Watashi no Moto-Kano (Chaser Game W: My Evil Boss is My Ex-Girlfriend).

On November 29, 2023, her 28th birthday, Sugai announced via Instagram her transfer to the talent agency Top Coat.

== Personal life ==
Sugai announced in March 2018 that she had graduated from university. She was a member and then manager of the equestrian club.

== Discography ==
=== Keyakizaka46 ===
Year	Single	Song	Notes
2016	"Silent Majority"	"Silent Majority" (サイレントマジョリティー)	
2016	"Silent Majority"	"Te o Tsunaide Kaerōka" (手を繋いで帰ろうか)	
2016	"Silent Majority"	"Kimi ga Inai" (キミガイナイ)	
2016	"Sekai ni wa Ai Shika Nai"	"Sekai ni wa Ai Shika Nai" (世界には愛しかない)	
2016	"Sekai ni wa Ai Shika Nai"	"Kataru Nara Mirai o..." (語るなら未来を...)	
2016	"Sekai ni wa Ai Shika Nai"	"Aozora ga Chigau" (青空が違う)	As part of Aozora to Marry
2016	"Futari Saison"	"Futari Saison" (二人セゾン)	
2016	"Futari Saison"	"Otona wa Shinjite Kurenai" (大人は信じてくれない)	
2016	"Futari Saison"	"Seifuku to Taiyō" (制服と太陽)	
2017	"Fukyōwaon"	"Fukyōwaon" (不協和音)	
2017	"Fukyōwaon"	"W-KEYAKIZAKA no Uta" (W-KEYAKIZAKAの詩)	
2017	"Fukyōwaon"	"Wareta Sumaho" (割れたスマホ)	As part of Aozora to Marry
2017	"Fukyōwaon"	"Eccentric" (エキセントリック)	
2017	"Kaze ni Fukarete mo"	"Kaze ni Fukarete mo" (風に吹かれても)	
2017	"Kaze ni Fukarete mo"	"Hiraishin" (避雷針)	
2017	"Kaze ni Fukarete mo"	"Namiuchigiwa o Hashiranai ka?" (波打ち際を走らないか?)	As part of Aozora to Marry
2018	"Glass wo Ware!"	"Glass wo Ware!" (ガラスを割れ!)	
2018	"Glass wo Ware!"	"Mou Mori e Kaerou ka?" (もう森へ帰ろうか?)	
2018	"Ambivalent"	"Ambivalent" (アンビバレント)	
2018	"Ambivalent"	"Student Dance"	
2018	"Ambivalent"	"I'm out"	
2019	"Kuroi Hitsuji"	"Kuroi Hitsuji" (黒い羊)	
2019	"Kuroi Hitsuji"	"Nobody"	
2019	"Kuroi Hitsuji"	"Heel no Taka-sa" (ヒールの高さ)	With Akane Moriya

=== Sakamichi AKB ===
Year	Single	Song
2017	"Shoot Sign"	"Dare no Koto wo Ichiban Aishiteru?" (誰のことを一番愛してる?)
2018	"Jabaja"	"Kokkyo no Nai Jidai" (国境のない時代)

== Filmography ==
=== Film ===
- Kaiju Guy! (2025), Mai Yoshida
- True Beauty: Before (2025), Aimi Kawashima
- True Beauty: After (2025), Aimi Kawashima
- Chaser Game W: A Match Made in Heaven (2026), Itsuki Harumoto

=== Television ===
- Chaser Game W (2024), Itsuki Harumoto
- Happy Kanako's Killer Life (2025), Kiyomi Yoshioka
- Brothers in Arms (2026), Maeda Matsu
