= Akane Moriya =

Japanese singer and model (born 1997)

- 守屋 茜
- Born: 12 November 1997 (age 29); Miyagi Prefecture, Japan
- Other names: Sergeant; Akanen
- Occupations: Singer; model
- Years active: 2015–present
- Modeling information
- Height: 164 cm (5 ft 5 in)
- Hair color: brown
- Eye color: black
- Agency: Sony Music Labels
- Website: website

Akane Moriya (守屋 茜, Moriya Akane; born 12 November 1997) is a Japanese singer and model. She is a former member and vice captain of the idol girl group Sakurazaka46. Like other members, Moriya is represented by Sony Music Labels.

== Biography ==
Born in Miyagi Prefecture, Moriya passed her first-year member audition of Keyakizaka46 on 21 August 2015 and started her activities. Her nicknames include Akanen (あかねん) and Sergeant (軍曹, Gunsō), the latter due to her athleticness and competitive nature.

During a handshake event on 21 January 2017, Moriya was named the vice captain of Keyakizaka46. On September 16, 2017, she made her runway debut at the fashion and music event GirlsAward 2017 AUTUMN／WINTER, held at the Makuhari Messe. She is also part of the subgroup Aozora to Marry (青空とMARRY) along with Rika Watanabe, Risa Watanabe, Yūka Sugai and Manaka Shida. As part of the subunit, Moriya made appearances in three songs: "Aozora Chigau" in "Sekai ni wa Ai Shika Nai", "Wareta Sumaho" in "Fukyōwaon, and "Namiuchigiwa o Hashiranai ka?" in "Kaze ni Fukarete mo".

On 8 May 2019, Shogakukan announced that they will be publishing a photo-book featuring Moriya that was photographed in Monaco. She became the seventh member in Keyakizaka46 to have a photobook, behind Rika Watanabe, Neru Nagahama, Yūka Sugai, Yui Imaizumi, Yui Kobayashi, and Risa Watanabe.

In January 2021, following Keyakizaka46's rebranding into Sakurazaka46 in October 2020, it was announced that Moriya would step down as vice captain. She was succeeded by second generation member Rina Matsuda.

== Discography ==
=== Singles ===
Year	Single	EAN
2016	Silent Majority	EAN 4988009125930
2016	Te o Tsunaide Kaerou ka	EAN 4988009125930
2016	Kimigainai	EAN 4988009125954
2016	Sekai ni wa Ai Shika Nai	EAN 4988009130804
2016	Katarunara Mirai o...	EAN 4988009130804
2016	Aozora ga Chigau	EAN 4988009130835
2016	Futari Saison	EAN 4547366279399
2016	Otona wa Shinjite Kurenai	EAN 4547366279399
2016	Seifuku to Taiyou	EAN 4547366279375
2017	Fukyōwaon	EAN 4547366301274
2017	W-Keyakizaka no Uta	EAN 4547366301274
2017	Wareta Smartphone	EAN 4547366301274
2017	Eccentric	EAN 4547366301298
2017	Kaze ni Fukarete mo	
2017	Hiraishin	
2017	Namiuchigiwa o Hashiranai ka	
2018	Garasu wo Ware	
2018	Mou Mori e Kaerou ka	
2018	Ambivalent	
2018	Student Dance	
2018	I'm Out	
2019	Kuroi Hitsuji	
2019	Nobody	
2019	Heel no Taka-sa	

=== Videos ===
Year	Title	EAN
2016	Akane Moriya	JAN 4988009125923
2016	Akane Moriya	JAN 4988009130835
2016	Akane Moriya	JAN 4547366279375
2017	KeyaBingo!	EAN 4988021715010
2017	Tokuyama Daigorō o Dare ga Koroshita ka?	EAN 4517331036388
2017	"Rika Watanabe"	JAN 4547366301267
2017	"グループ発展祈願の旅 〜栃木編〜"	JAN 4547366331639
2017	"残酷な観客達"	JAN 4988021715553
2018	"グループ発展祈願の旅 〜栃木編〜"	JAN 4547366331639

== Filmography ==
=== Film ===
Year	Title	Role	Notes	Ref(s)
2024	Sin and Evil	Kiyomi		

=== Events ===
Year	Title	Ref(s)
2017	Girls Award 2017 Autumn/Winter	
2018	Tokyo Girls Collection 2018 Spring/Summer	

== Bibliography ==
=== Photobook Release ===
On May 8, 2019, it was announced that Akane Moriya will release her first photo collection.

Title	First week sales	Ref(s)
潜在意識 (Subconscious)		
