= Glass wo Ware! =

- Regular edition cover. Each version A, B, C, and D has separate cover artwork.

Single by Keyakizaka46

from the album Eien Yori Nagai Isshun: Ano Koro, Tashika ni Sonzaishita Watashitachi
- Released: March 7, 2018
- Genre: J-pop
- Label: Sony Music Entertainment Japan
- Composers: Maesako Junya, Yasutaka:Ishio
- Lyricist: Yasushi Akimoto

Keyakizaka46 singles chronology
"Kaze ni Fukarete mo" (2017)	"Glass wo Ware!" (2018)	"Ambivalent" (2018)

Music video
- "Garasu wo Ware!" (Keyakizaka46 official ch.) "Glass wo Ware!" (Sony Music Taiwan) "Glass wo Ware!" (Keyakizaka46 Vevo) on YouTube

"Glass wo Ware!" (Japanese: ガラスを割れ!, Hepburn: Garasu o Ware!; literally "break the glass!") is the 6th single from Japanese idol group Keyakizaka46. It was released on March 7, 2018 under Sony Music Records. The music video for the title track is filmed in Suwa, Nagano and features Yurina Hirate as center.

== Track listing ==
=== Type A ===
All lyrics are written by Yasushi Akimoto.

CD
No.	Title	Music	Length
1.	"Glass wo Ware!" (ガラスを割れ!)	Maesako Junya, Yasutaka:Ishio	3:43
2.	"Mou Mori e Kaerou ka?" (もう森へ帰ろうか？)	Kawahara Kensuke	4:21
3.	"Yoake no Kodoku" (夜明けの孤独)	Kawaura Masahiro	4:50
4.	"Glass wo Ware!" (off-vocal)	Maesako Junya, Yasutaka:Ishio	3:43
5.	"Mou Mori e Kaerou ka?" (off-vocal)	Kawahara Kensuke	4:21
6.	"Yoake no Kodoku" (off-vocal)	Kawaura Masahiro	4:48

DVD
No.	Title	Length
1.	"Glass wo Ware! music video"	4:00
2.	"Mou Mori e Kaerou ka? music video"	4:21
3.	"Selfie TV by Nijika Ishimori, Rina Uemura, Fuyuka Saito, Manaka Shida, Mizuho Habu, and Aoi Harada"

=== Type B ===
All lyrics are written by Yasushi Akimoto.

CD
No.	Title	Music	Length
1.	"Glass wo Ware!" (ガラスを割れ!)	Maesako Junya, Yasutaka:Ishio	3:43
2.	"Mou Mori e Kaerou ka?" (もう森へ帰ろうか？)	Kawahara Kensuke	4:21
3.	"Ima ni Mite iro" (イマニミテイロ)	Maesako Junya, Yasutaka:Ishio	4:37
4.	"Glass wo Ware!" (off-vocal)	Maesako Junya, Yasutaka:Ishio	3:43
5.	"Mou Mori e Kaerou ka?" (off-vocal)	Kawahara Kensuke	4:21
6.	"Ima ni Mite iro" (off-vocal)	Maesako Junya, Yasutaka:Ishio	4:35

DVD
No.	Title	Length
1.	"Glass wo Ware! music video"	4:00
2.	"Mou Mori e Kaerou ka? music video"	4:21
3.	"Selfie TV by Rika Ozeki, Nana Oda, Shiori Sato, Nanako Nagasawa, Akane Moriya, Nanami Yonetani, and Rika Watanabe"

=== Type C ===
All lyrics are written by Yasushi Akimoto.

CD
No.	Title	Music	Length
1.	"Glass wo Ware!" (ガラスを割れ!)	Maesako Junya, Yasutaka:Ishio	3:43
2.	"Mou Mori e Kaerou ka?" (もう森へ帰ろうか？)	Kawahara Kensuke	4:21
3.	"Zenmai Shikake no Yume" (ゼンマイ仕掛けの夢)	Yamamoto Katsuhiko	3:59
4.	"Glass wo Ware!" (off-vocal)	Maesako Junya, Yasutaka:Ishio	3:43
5.	"Mou Mori e Kaerou ka?" (off-vocal)	Kawahara Kensuke	4:21
6.	"Zenmai Shikake no Yume" (off-vocal)	Yamamoto Katsuhiko	3:58

DVD
No.	Title	Length
1.	"Glass wo Ware! music video"	4:00
2.	"Mou Mori e Kaerou ka? music video"	4:21
3.	"Selfie TV by Minami Koike, Yui Kobayashi, Yūka Sugai, and Yurina Hirate"

=== Type D ===
All lyrics are written by Yasushi Akimoto.

CD
No.	Title	Music	Length
1.	"Glass wo Ware!" (ガラスを割れ!)	Maesako Junya, Yasutaka:Ishio	3:43
2.	"Mou Mori e Kaerou ka?" (もう森へ帰ろうか？)	Kawahara Kensuke	4:21
3.	"Bathroom Travel" (バスルームトラベル)	Furuppe	3:53
4.	"Glass wo Ware!" (off-vocal)	Maesako Junya, Yasutaka:Ishio	3:43
5.	"Mou Mori e Kaerou ka?" (off-vocal)	Kawahara Kensuke	4:21
6.	"Bathroom Travel" (off-vocal)	Furuppe	3:51

DVD
No.	Title	Length
1.	"Glass wo Ware! music video"	4:00
2.	"Mou Mori e Kaerou ka? music video"	4:21
3.	"Selfie TV by Miyu Suzumoto, Neru Nagahama, and Risa Watanabe"
4.	"Hiragana Keyakizaka46 2nd Generation Bonus Footage"

=== Regular edition ===
All lyrics are written by Yasushi Akimoto.

CD
No.	Title	Music	Length
1.	"Glass wo Ware!" (ガラスを割れ!)	Maesako Junya, Yasutaka:Ishio	3:43
2.	"Mou Mori e Kaerou ka?" (もう森へ帰ろうか？)	Kawahara Kensuke	4:21
3.	"Hanbun no Kioku" (半分の記憶)	Yoshida Tsukasa, Murayama SHIBERIUSU Tatsuhiko	3:53
4.	"Glass wo Ware!" (off-vocal)	Maesako Junya, Yasutaka:Ishio	3:43
5.	"Mou Mori e Kaerou ka?" (off-vocal)	Kawahara Kensuke	4:21
6.	"Hanbun no Kioku" (off-vocal)	Yoshida Tsukasa, Murayama SHIBERIUSU Tatsuhiko	3:51

== Participating members ==
=== "Glass wo Ware!" ===
Center: Yurina Hirate

- 1st row: Mizuho Habu, Miyu Suzumoto, Yui Kobayashi, Yurina Hirate, Yui Imaizumi, Minami Koike, Risa Watanabe
- 2nd row: Manaka Shida, Rina Uemura, Yūka Sugai, Neru Nagahama, Akane Moriya, Rika Ozeka, Rika Watanabe
- 3rd row: Fuyuka Saitō, Nanako Nagasawa, Aoi Harada, Nana Oda, Nanami Yonetani, Shiori Satō, Nijika Ishimori

=== "Mou Mori e Kaerou ka?" ===
- Nijika Ishimori, Yui Imaizumi, Rina Uemura, Rika Ozeka, Nana Oda, Minami Koike, Yui Kobayashi, Fuyuka Saitō, Shiori Satō, Manaka Shida, Yūka Sugai, Miyu Suzumoto, Nanako Nagasawa, Neru Nagahama, Mizuho Habu, Aoi Harada, Yurina Hirate, Akane Moriya, Nanami Yonetani, Rika Watanabe, Risa Watanabe

=== "Yoake no Kodoku" ===
- Yurina Hirate

=== "Ima ni Mite iro" ===
Center: Mirei Sasaki

- Mao Iguchi, Sarina Ushio, Memi Kakizaki, Yūka Kameyama, Shiho Katō, Kyōko Saitō, Kumi Sasaki, Mirei Sasaki, Mana Takase, Ayaka Takamoto, Mei Higashimura

=== "Zenmai Shikake no Yume" ===
- Yui Imaizumi, Yui Kobayashi

=== "Bathroom Travel" ===
- Rika Ozeki, Minami Koike, Neru Nagahama

=== "Hanbun no Kioku" ===
Center: Nao Kosaka

- Miku Kanemura, Hina Kawata, Nao Kosaka, Suzuka Tomita, Akari Nibu, Hiyori Hamagishi, Konoka Matsuda, Manamo Miyata, Miho Watanabe

== Charts ==
=== Weekly charts ===
Chart (2018)	Peak position
Billboard Japan Hot 100	1
Japan (Oricon)	1

=== Year-end charts ===
Chart (2018)	Position
Billboard Japan Hot 100	3
Japan (Oricon)	8

== Certifications ==
Region	Certification	Certified units/sales
Japan (RIAJ) physical sales	Million	1,021,450
Japan (RIAJ) digital sales	Gold	100,000^{*}
^{*} Sales figures based on certification alone.
