= List of Oricon number-one singles of 2016 =

The following is a list of Oricon number-one singles of 2016.

== Chart history ==
Issue date	Song	Artist(s)	Ref.
January 4	"Kuchibiru ni Be My Baby"	AKB48	
January 11	"Tsumetai Kaze to Kataomoi / Endless Sky / One and Only"	Morning Musume '15	
January 18	"Boymen Ninja"	Boys and Men	
January 25	"Hane"	Koshi Inaba	
February 1	"Hikari no Shizuku / Touch"	NEWS	
February 8	"G4・IV"	Glay	
February 15	"Wanna be!"	Boys and Men	
February 22	"Tragedy"	KAT-TUN	
February 29	"Sakura Night Fever / Chotto Guchoku ni! Chototsu Moushin / Osu! Kobushi Tamashii"	Magnolia Factory	
March 7	"Fukkatsu Love"	Arashi	
March 14	"Unlock"	KAT-TUN	
March 21	"Kimi wa Melody"	AKB48	
March 28	"Gravity"	Kis-My-Ft2	
April 4	"Harujion ga Sakukoro"	Nogizaka46	
April 11	"Chicken Line"	SKE48	
April 18	"Silent Majority"	Keyakizaka46	
April 25	"74 Okubun no 1 no Kimi e"	HKT48	
May 2	"Gyakuten Winner"	Johnny's West	
May 9	"Amagami Hime"	NMB48	
May 16	"Shouri no Hi made"	Sexy Zone	
May 23	"Maji SUNSHINE"	Hey! Say! JUMP	
May 30	"I Seek/Daylight"	Arashi	
June 6	"I Seek/Daylight"	Arashi	
June 13	"Tsubasa wa Iranai"	AKB48	
June 20	"Beautiful World"	V6	
June 27	"L.U.V"	BTOB	
July 4	"Hi-Fi☆Days"	The Cinderella Project	
July 11	"Namida"	Generations from Exile Tribe	
July 18	"Tsumi to Natsu"	Kanjani Eight	
July 25	"Koi wo Shiranai Kimi e"	NEWS	
August 1	"Bara to Taiyo"	KinKi Kids	
August 8	"Hadashi de Summer"	Nogizaka46	
August 15	"Boku wa Inai"	NMB48	
August 22	"Sekai ni wa Ai Shika Nai"	Keyakizaka46	
August 29	"Kin no Ai, Gin no Ai"	SKE48	
September 5	"Sha la la☆Summer Time"	Kis-My-Ft2	
September 12	"Love Trip / Shiawase wo Wakenasai"	AKB48	
September 19	"Saikō Kayo"	HKT48	
September 26	"Power of the Paradise"	Arashi	
October 3	"WILD WILD WILD"	Exile The Second	
October 10	"Dumb & Dumber"	iKon	
October 17	"Another Starting Line"	Hi-Standard	
October 24	"Panorama"	Kanjani Eight	
October 31	"Yobisute"	Sexy Zone	
November 7	"Fantastic Time"	Hey! Say! JUMP	
November 14	"Michi wa Tezukara Yume no Hana"	KinKi Kids	
November 21	"Sayonara no Imi"	Nogizaka46	
November 28	"High Tension"	AKB48	
December 5	"Sexy Cat no Enzetsu / Mukidashi de Mukiatte / Sō ja Nai"	Morning Musume '16	
December 12	"Futari Saison"	Keyakizaka46	
December 19	"NOROSHI"	Kanjani Eight	
December 26	"Give Me Love"	Hey! Say! JUMP	

== See also ==
- List of Oricon number-one albums of 2016
