= Ambivalent =

Ambivalent may refer to:

- Ambivalence, a state of conflicting beliefs or feelings
- "Ambivalent" (song), a 2018 song by Keyakizaka46
- Ambivalent, a 2007 album by Tomoyasu Hotei
