= Yui Kobayashi =

Japanese model and member of Keyakizaka46

Yui Kobayashi 小林 由依
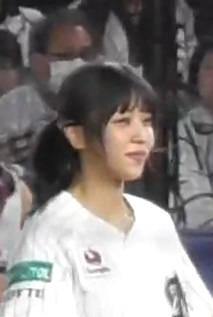

Background information
- Also known as: Yousti
- Born: October 23, 1999 (age 26); Gunma Prefecture, Japan
- Origin: Saitama Prefecture, Japan
- Genres: J-pop
- Occupations: Singer; model
- Years active: 2015–present
- Label: Sony Music Records
- Formerly of: Sakurazaka46
- Website: Official website

Yui Kobayashi (Japanese: 小林 由依, Hepburn: Kobayashi Yui; born 23 October 1999), also known as Yousti (stylized in all lowercase), is a Japanese singer and model. She is a former member of the idol group Sakurazaka46 (formerly Keyakizaka46). She is represented by Sony Music Records and is an exclusive model with a fashion magazine with.

== Career ==
=== 2015–2024: Sakurazaka46 ===
On August 21, 2015, Kobayashi along with 22 other members was announced for the newly created idol group Toriizaka46, later renamed to Keyakizaka46 and currently known as Sakurazaka46. Kobayashi made her musical debut with Keyakizaka46's first single, Silent Majority. In October of the same year, Kobayashi made her runway debut at the GirlsAward 2016 Autumn/Winter fashion show.

As of 2019, Kobayashi has made an appearance in all Keyakizaka46 singles. She formed a duo named "Yui-chans" (ゆいちゃんず, Yuichanzu) with Yui Imaizumi, first appearing in Silent Majority with the song "Shibugakawa". With Imaizumi's graduation in 2018, Kobayashi and Mizuho Habu formed another duo named "Senko Shimai" (線香姉妹), appearing in Ambivalent with "302-Goshitsu". She held performance center roles typically held by Yurina Hirate when Hirate was unavailable, including the 60th Japan Record Awards and the 69th NHK Kōhaku Uta Gassen.

Kobayashi became an exclusive model for fashion magazine with on July 27, 2018. On March 13, 2019, she released a photo-book titled Kanjō no Kōzu (感情の構図), published by Kadokawa.

Kobayashi's first independent acting role was in the 2020 live-action adaptation of Wasteful Days of High School Girls by TV Asahi. She played the role of Lily Someya, a multiracial transfer student; Kobayashi dyed her hair blonde for the role. She will appear in Sakura, an upcoming movie to be released on 13 November 2020.

On November 29, 2023, Kobayashi announced that she would be leaving Sakurazaka46 after her graduation concert on January 31–February 1, 2024 at the Yoyogi National Stadium.

=== 2025–present: Solo career as Yousti ===
In May 2025, Kobayashi announced her upcoming debut as a solo singer under the name Yousti. The stage name is a combination of her name and "ostrich", as she wished that her music could be a temporary "escape from reality" for those facing hardships (based on the common misconception that ostriches bury their heads in sand to avoid danger). Her official fandom name is "Aisti", a combination of "love" (愛, ai), the English superlative degree suffix "st", and the English "I". Her first self-titled EP was released on August 27.

== Discography ==
Year	Single	Song	Notes
2016	"Silent Majority"	"Silent Majority" (サイレントマジョリティー)	
2016	"Silent Majority"	"Te o Tsunaide Kaerōka" (手を繋いで帰ろうか)	
2016	"Silent Majority"	"Shibuyagawa" (渋谷川)	As "Yuichanzu" with Yui Imaizumi
2016	"Silent Majority"	"Noriokureta Bus" (乗り遅れたバス)	With Yui Imaizumi, Yurina Hirate, Miyu Suzumoto, and Rika Watanabe
2016	"Silent Majority"	"Kimi ga Inai" (キミガイナイ)	
2016	"Sekai ni wa Ai Shika Nai"	"Sekai ni wa Ai Shika Nai" (世界には愛しかない)	
2016	"Sekai ni wa Ai Shika Nai"	"Kataru Nara Mirai o..." (語るなら未来を…)	
2016	"Sekai ni wa Ai Shika Nai"	"Bob Dylan wa Kaesanai" (ボブディランは返さない)	As "Yuichanzu" with Yui Imaizumi
2016	"Futari Saison"	"Futari Saison" (二人セゾン)	
2016	"Futari Saison"	"Otona wa Shinjite Kurenai" (大人は信じてくれない)	
2016	"Futari Saison"	"Seifuku to Taiyō" (制服と太陽)	
2016	"Futari Saison"	"Yuuhi 1/3" (夕陽1/3)	With Yui Imaizumi, Yurina Hirate, and Neru Nagahama
2017	"Fukyōwaon"	"Fukyōwaon" (不協和音)	
2017	"Fukyōwaon"	"W-KEYAKIZAKA no Uta" (W-KEYAKIZAKAの詩)	
2017	"Fukyōwaon"	"Tuning"	As "Yuichanzu" with Yui Imaizumi
2017	"Fukyōwaon"	"Eccentric" (エキセントリック)	
2017	"Kaze ni Fukarete mo"	"Kaze ni Fukarete mo" (風に吹かれても)	
2017	"Kaze ni Fukarete mo"	"Hiraishin" (避雷針)	
2018	"Glass wo Ware!"	"Glass wo Ware!" (ガラスを割れ!)	
2018	"Glass wo Ware!"	"Mou Mori e Kaerou ka?" (もう森へ帰ろうか?)	
2018	"Glass wo Ware!"	"Zenmai Shikake no Yume" (ゼンマイ仕掛けの夢)	As "Yuichanzu" with Yui Imaizumi
2018	"Ambivalent"	"Ambivalent" (アンビバレント)	
2018	"Ambivalent"	"Student Dance"	
2018	"Ambivalent"	"I'm out"	
2018	"Ambivalent"	"302-Goshitsu" (302号室)	As "Senko Shimai" with Mizuho Habu
2019	"Kuroi Hitsuji"	"Kuroi Hitsuji" (黒い羊)	
2019	"Kuroi Hitsuji"	"Nobody"	

== Filmography ==
=== Film ===
Year	Title	Role	Notes	Ref.
2020	Sakura	Kaoru		

=== TV series ===
Year	Title	Role	Notes	Ref.
2020	Wasteful Days of High School Girls	Lily Someya		
2021	Borderless	Kotone Ichihara		
2023	Actress	Kotone Nakajima		
