= Ambivalent (song) =

2018 single by Keyakizaka46

- Regular edition cover. Each version A, B, C, and D has separate cover artwork.

Single by Keyakizaka46

from the album Eien Yori Nagai Isshun: Ano Koro, Tashika ni Sonzaishita Watashitachi
- Released: August 15, 2018
- Genre: J-pop
- Length: 4:34
- Label: Sony Music Entertainment Japan
- Composers: Kenta Urashima, Tetta
- Lyricist: Yasushi Akimoto

Keyakizaka46 singles chronology
"Glass wo Ware!" (2018)	"Ambivalent" (2018)	"Kuroi Hitsuji" (2019)

Music video
- "Ambivalent" (Keyakizaka46 official ch.) "Ambivalent" (Sony Music Taiwan) "Ambivalent" (Vevo) on YouTube

"Ambivalent" (Japanese: アンビバレント, Hepburn: Anbibarento) is the 7th single from Japanese idol group Keyakizaka46. It was released on August 15, 2018 under Sony Music Records. The title track features Yurina Hirate as center.

Manaka Shida, Aoi Harada, and Yūka Kageyama were on hiatus during production. Yui Imaizumi announced graduation shortly before and did not participate, but sang a solo song, "Hi ga Noburu Made", which was included on the regular edition.

== Track listing ==
=== Type A ===
All lyrics are written by Yasushi Akimoto.

CD
No.	Title	Music	Length
1.	"Ambivalent" (アンビバレント)	Kenta Urashima, TETTA	4:34
2.	"Student Dance"	SaSA	4:25
3.	"I'm out"	minato	3:54
4.	"Ambivalent" (off-vocal)	Kenta Urashima, TETTA	4:34
5.	"Student Dance" (off-vocal)	SaSA	4:25
6.	"I'm out" (off-vocal)	minato	3:54

DVD
No.	Title	Length
1.	"Ambivalent music video"	5:07
2.	"Student Dance music video"	4:38
3.	"Selfie TV by Nijika Ishimori X Konoka Matsuda"	11:16
4.	"Selfie TV by Yui Imaizumi X Kyoko Saito"	10:44
5.	"Selfie TV by Rika Ozeki X Akari Nibu"	11:01
6.	"Selfie TV by Nanako Nagasawa X Suzuka Tomita"	10:52
7.	"Selfie TV by Rika Watanabe X Mao Iguchi"	11:04

=== Type B ===
All lyrics are written by Yasushi Akimoto.

CD
No.	Title	Music	Length
1.	"Ambivalent" (アンビバレント)	Kenta Urashima, TETTA	4:34
2.	"Student Dance"	SaSA	4:25
3.	"Happy Aura" (ハッピーオーラ)	Satoshi Ikezawa	4:03
4.	"Ambivalent" (off-vocal)	Kenta Urashima, TETTA	4:34
5.	"Student Dance" (off-vocal)	SaSA	4:25
6.	"Happy Aura" (off-vocal)	Satoshi Ikezawa	4:03

DVD
No.	Title	Length
1.	"Ambivalent music video"	5:07
2.	"Happy Aura music video"	4:52
3.	"Selfie TV by Rina Uemura X Sarina Ushio"	10:46
4.	"Selfie TV by Yui Kobayashi X Hiyori Hamagishi"	10:59
5.	"Selfie TV by Neru Nagahama X Nao Kosaka"	10:15
6.	"Selfie TV by Akane Moriya X Manamo Miyata"	10:24
7.	"Selfie TV by Nanami Yonetani X Mirei Sasaki"	9:52

=== Type C ===
All lyrics are written by Yasushi Akimoto.

CD
No.	Title	Music	Length
1.	"Ambivalent" (アンビバレント)	Kenta Urashima, TETTA	4:34
2.	"Student Dance"	SaSA	4:25
3.	"302-Goshitsu" (302号室)	Giridai Oda	4:12
4.	"Ambivalent" (off-vocal)	Kenta Urashima, TETTA	4:34
5.	"Student Dance" (off-vocal)	SaSA	4:25
6.	"302-Goshitsu" (off-vocal)	Giridai Oda	4:12

DVD
No.	Title	Length
1.	"Ambivalent music video"	5:07
2.	"302-Goshitsu music video"	5:05
3.	"Selfie TV by Minami Koike X Mana Takase"	10:43
4.	"Selfie TV by Fuyuka Saito X Mei Higashimura"	11:09
5.	"Selfie TV by Shiori Sato X Miku Kanemura"	10:52
6.	"Selfie TV by Yūka Sugai X Kumi Sasaki"	11:19
7.	"Selfie TV by Risa Watanabe X Miho Watanabe"	11:05

=== Type D ===
All lyrics are written by Yasushi Akimoto.

CD
No.	Title	Music	Length
1.	"Ambivalent" (アンビバレント)	Kenta Urashima, TETTA	4:34
2.	"Student Dance"	SaSA	4:25
3.	"Ongaku Shitsu ni Kataomoi" (音楽室に片想い)	Yuichi Ichikawa	4:09
4.	"Ambivalent" (off-vocal)	Kenta Urashima, TETTA	4:34
5.	"Student Dance" (off-vocal)	SaSA	4:25
6.	"Ongaku Shitsu ni Kataomoi" (off-vocal)	Yuichi Ichikawa	4:09

DVD
No.	Title	Length
1.	"Ambivalent music video"	5:07
2.	"Ongaku Shitsu ni Kataomoi music video"	4:20
3.	"Selfie TV by Nana Oda X Hina Kawata"	10:53
4.	"Selfie TV by Miyu Suzumoto X Ayaka Takamoto"	11:25
5.	"Selfie TV by Mizuho Habu X Shiho Kato"	11:16
6.	"Selfie TV by Yurina Hirate X Memi Kakizaki"	11:56

=== Regular edition ===
All lyrics are written by Yasushi Akimoto.

CD
No.	Title	Music	Length
1.	"Ambivalent" (アンビバレント)	Kenta Urashima, TETTA	4:34
2.	"Student Dance"	SaSA	4:25
3.	"Hi ga Noboru Made" (日が昇るまで)	Tomomi Narimoto	4:53
4.	"Ambivalent" (off-vocal)	Kenta Urashima, TETTA	4:34
5.	"Student Dance" (off-vocal)	SaSA	4:25
6.	"Hi ga Noboru Made" (off-vocal)	Tomomi Narimoto	4:53

== Participating members ==
=== "Ambivalent" ===
Center: Yurina Hirate

- 1st row: Mizuho Habu, Miyu Suzumoto, Yurina Hirate, Risa Watanabe, Yui Kobayashi
- 2nd row: Rina Uemura, Yūka Sugai, Neru Nagahama, Minami Koike, Nanako Nagasawa
- 3rd row: Nana Oda, Fuyuka Saitō, Akane Moriya, Rika Watanabe, Rika Ozeki, Nanami Yonetani, Nijika Ishimori, Shiori Sato

=== "Student Dance" ===
- Nijika Ishimori, Rina Uemura, Rika Ozeki, Nana Oda, Minami Koike, Yui Kobayashi, Fuyuka Saitō, Shiori Sato, Yūka Sugai, Miyu Suzumoto, Nanako Nagasawa, Neru Nagahama, Mizuho Habu, Yurina Hirate, Akane Moriya, Nanami Yonetani, Rika Watanabe, Risa Watanabe

=== "I'm out" ===
- Nijika Ishimori, Rina Uemura, Rika Ozeki, Nana Oda, Minami Koike, Yui Kobayashi, Fuyuka Saitō, Shiori Sato, Yūka Sugai, Miyu Suzumoto, Nanako Nagasawa, Neru Nagahama, Mizuho Habu, Yurina Hirate, Akane Moriya, Nanami Yonetani, Rika Watanabe, Risa Watanabe

=== "Happy Aura" ===
Center: Shiho Katō

- Hiragana Keyakizaka46 1st Generation: Mao Iguchi, Sarina Ushio, Memi Kakizaki, Shiho Katō, Kyōko Saitō, Kumi Sasaki, Mirei Sasaki, Mana Takase, Ayaka Takamoto, Mei Higashimura
- Hiragana Keyakizaka46 2nd Generation: Miku Kanemura, Hina Kawata, Nao Kosaka, Suzuka Tomita, Akari Nibu, Hiyori Hamagishi, Konoka Matsuda, Manamo Miyata, Miho Watanabe

=== "302-Goshitsu" ===
- Yui Kobayashi, Mizuho Habu

=== "Ongaku Shitsu ni Kataomoi" ===
- Rika Ozeki, Minami Koike, Neru Nagahama

=== "Hi ga Noburu Made" ===
- Yui Imaizumi

== Charts ==
=== Weekly charts ===
Chart (2018)	Peak position
Billboard Japan Hot 100	1
Oricon	1

=== Year-end charts ===
Chart (2018)	Peak position
Billboard Japan Hot 100	11
Oricon	9
