= Mizuho Habu =

Japanese singer and model

Mizuho Habu 土生 瑞穂
- Also known as: Habu-chan
- Born: July 7, 1997 (age 28); Tokyo, Japan
- Genres: J-pop
- Occupations: Japanese idol model
- Years active: 2015–present
- Label: Sony Music Records

Mizuho Habu (Japanese: 土生 瑞穂, Hepburn: Habu Mizuho) is a Japanese model. She is a former member of Japanese idol group Sakurazaka46 & was formerly represented by Sony Music Records.

== Career ==
On August 21, 2015, Habu along with 21 other members were announced for the newly created idol group, Toriizaka46 (now Sakurazaka46). Habu made her musical debut with Keyakizaka46's first single, Silent Majority. As of February 2019, she has participated in all eight of Keyakizaka46's singles. Habu is also part of the subunits "FIVE CARDS" and "Goninbayashi" (五人囃子).

Habu's modeling career started when she was featured on GirlsAward 2016 Spring/Summer, becoming the first Keyakizaka46 member to get on a runway show. In April 2018, she became an exclusive model for fashion magazine JJ along with Nogizaka46 member Hina Higuchi. The two were featured on the July edition cover the same year.

On August 22, 2023, Habu announced her intention to leave Sakurazaka46 on November 25, 2023, with the group's 3rd Year Anniversary Live concert.

== Discography ==
Year	Single	Song	Notes
2016	"Silent Majority"	"Silent Majority" (サイレントマジョリティー)	
2016	"Silent Majority"	"Te o Tsunaide Kaerōka" (手を繋いで帰ろうか)	
2016	"Silent Majority"	"Kimi ga Inai" (キミガイナイ)	
2016	"Sekai ni wa Ai Shika Nai"	"Sekai ni wa Ai Shika Nai" (世界には愛しかない)	
2016	"Sekai ni wa Ai Shika Nai"	"Kataru Nara Mirai o..." (語るなら未来を…)	
2016	"Futari Saison"	"Futari Saison" (二人セゾン)	
2016	"Futari Saison"	"Otona wa Shinjite Kurenai" (大人は信じてくれない)	
2016	"Futari Saison"	"Seifuku to Taiyō" (制服と太陽)	
2016	"Futari Saison"	"Bokutachi no Sensou" (僕たちの戦争)	As part of FIVE CARDS
2017	"Fukyōwaon"	"Fukyōwaon" (不協和音)	
2017	"Fukyōwaon"	"W-KEYAKIZAKA no Uta" (W-KEYAKIZAKAの詩)	
2017	"Fukyōwaon"	"Eccentric" (エキセントリック)	
2017	"Kaze ni Fukarete mo"	"Kaze ni Fukarete mo" (風に吹かれても)	
2017	"Kaze ni Fukarete mo"	"Kekkyoku, Jaa ne Shika Ienai" (結局、じゃあねしか言えない)	As part of Goninbayashi
2017	"Kaze ni Fukarete mo"	"Hiraishin" (避雷針)	
2018	"Glass wo Ware!"	"Glass wo Ware!" (ガラスを割れ!)	
2018	"Glass wo Ware!"	"Mou Mori e Kaerou ka?" (もう森へ帰ろうか?)	
2018	"Ambivalent"	"Ambivalent" (アンビバレント)	
2018	"Ambivalent"	"Student Dance"	
2018	"Ambivalent"	"I'm out"	
2018	"Ambivalent"	"302-Goshitsu" (302号室)	With Yui Kobayashi
2019	"Kuroi Hitsuji"	"Kuroi Hitsuji" (黒い羊)	
2019	"Kuroi Hitsuji"	"Nobody"	
