= Wasteful Days of High School Girls =

Japanese manga series

- Cover of Wasteful Days of High School Girls volume 1 by Kadokawa Shoten

女子高生の無駄づかい (Joshi Kōsei no Mudazukai)
- Genre: Comedy
- Manga
- Written by: Bino
- Published by: Kadokawa Shoten
- Imprint: Kadokawa Comics Ace
- Magazine: Niconico Seiga; Comic Newtype; pixiv Comic
- Original run: 2014 – present
- Volumes: 16
- Anime television series
- Directed by: Takeo Takahashi (Chief); Hijiri Sanpei
- Written by: Masahiro Yokotani
- Music by: Tomoki Kikuya
- Studio: Passione
- Licensed by: NA: Sentai Filmworks; SA/SEA: Muse Communication
- Original network: AT-X; Tokyo MX; TVA; KBS; SUN; BS11
- Original run: July 5, 2019 – September 20, 2019
- Episodes: 12
- Television drama
- Directed by: Daisuke Yamamoto; Ken Higurashi; Ryō Nakajima; Kōji Hora
- Written by: Shigenori Tanabe; Kōichi Yajima; Takashi Tsunoda; Yuri Yamada; Kei Andō; Shin'ya Tamada
- Music by: Natsumi Tabuchi; Hanae Nakamura
- Original network: TV Asahi
- Original run: January 24, 2020 – March 6, 2020
- Episodes: 7

Wasteful Days of High School Girls (女子高生の無駄づかい, Joshi Kōsei no Mudazukai) is a Japanese manga series by Bino, serialized online via Niconico Seiga, Comic Newtype, and pixiv Comic websites since 2014. It has been collected in sixteen tankōbon volumes by Kadokawa Shoten as of June 2026. An anime television series adaptation by Passione aired from July to September 2019. A live-action series aired on TV Asahi from January to March 2020.

On June 9, 2021, it was announced the manga would go on a hiatus after the author Bino gave birth to her first child. The manga resumed the same year on December 24.

== Plot ==
Nozomu "Baka" Tanaka, Akane "Wota" Kikuchi, and Shiori "Robo" Saginomiya are three childhood friends studying at the same high school. Nozomu, feeling bored and never being good at academics, decides to give nicknames to all their classmates, including Akane and Shiori, basing them on their respective personalities. The three and the others live out their high school lives, befriending their classmates and getting to know about their traits, interests, and quirks, seeing that there is more to school than just studying.

== Characters ==
The names and nicknames of all the characters are puns and allusions to the central "quirk" of their personality. For example, the name Lily is a hint of a lilies, whose Japanese title "yuri" is also used to refer to lesbian love in Japanese pop culture.

Nozomu "Baka" Tanaka (田中 望, Tanaka Nozomu)
Voiced by: Chinatsu Akasaki (Japanese); Elissa Cuellar (English)
Portrayed by: Yui Okada (2020 drama)
Nozomu is the series' protagonist possessing a stupid and annoying behavior that her close friends call her "Baka", meaning "idiot" in Japanese.
Akane "Wota" Kikuchi (菊池 茜, Kikuchi Akane)
Voiced by: Haruka Tomatsu (Japanese); Luci Christian (English)
Portrayed by: Yuri Tsunematsu (2020 drama)
Wota is an aspiring manga artist and a fan of yaoi media. She develops feelings for her teacher Waseda, but denies it. Wota also listens to the music of the Vocaloid producer Teishotoku-P, unaware that he is actually Waseda.
Shiori "Robo" Saginomiya (鷺宮 しおり, Saginomiya Shiori)
Voiced by: Aki Toyosaki (Japanese); Genevieve Simmons (English)
Portrayed by: Yurika Nakamura (2020 drama)
Robo is an emotionless smart girl who aspires to be a microbiologist. She is childhood friends with Baka and Wota, whom she met while in elementary school. Robo went to the same middle school as Majime.
Saku "Loli" Momoi (百井 咲久, Momoi Saku)
Voiced by: Maria Naganawa (Japanese); Hilary Haag (English)
Portrayed by: Mei Hata (2020 drama)
Loli is a short girl with the height of a primary school student. Her appearance is ironically combined with childhood innocence, which is why she is constantly becoming a victim of "adult" misunderstandings. Loli lives with her grandmother as her parents are working overseas in Germany.
Minami "Yamai" Yamamoto (山本 美波, Yamamoto Minami)
Voiced by: Miyu Tomita (Japanese); Maggie Flecknoe (English)
Portrayed by: Momoko Fukuchi (2020 drama)
Yamai is a girl with a chunibyo personality who dyed her hair blonde. She often talks to Waseda regarding her thoughts and plans.
Kanade "Majime" Ninomae (一 奏, Ninomae Kanade)
Voiced by: Rie Takahashi (Japanese); Kira Vincent-Davis (English)
Portrayed by: Nana Asakawa (2020 drama)
Majime is a tomboyish yet shy girl who is incredibly popular with others due to her masculine appearance, but does not notice it herself because of her social clumsiness. Thanks to her outstanding, logical thinking, she is incredibly talented in mathematics, but completely ignorant in ordinary human relationships at the same time. As a result, Majime admires Robo very much, who she also considers smart and sociable.
Hisui "Majo" Kujyō (久条 翡翠, Kujō Hisui)
Voiced by: Mao Ichimichi (Japanese); Christina Kelly (English)
Portrayed by: Ayaka Imoto (2020 drama)
Majo is a student who rarely comes to school and who has an interest in the occult. She has a twin sister named Kohaku.
Lily Someya (染谷 リリィ, Someya Rirī)
Voiced by: Satomi Satō (Japanese); Skyler Sinclair (English)
Portrayed by: Yui Kobayashi (2020 drama)
Lily is a half-Austrian transfer student. Her role in the plot is a parody of lesbian characters, which is unclear how much this is connected with her real sexuality or just phobia for men. Deep down, she becomes one of the most popular girls of their school, but her life is often complicated due to the quirks of other characters. She sometimes develops the hives when she comes close to Baka.
Masataka "Waseda" Sawatari (佐渡 正敬, Sawatari Masataka)
Voiced by: Kazuyuki Okitsu (Japanese); Scott Gibbs (English)
Portrayed by: Keita Machida (2020 drama)
Waseda is the class' homeroom teacher. He is only attracted to female university students. He also regularly has consultations with Yamai. A running gag involves his glasses breaking when Yamai mentions something regarding her chunibyo behavior. Outside school, Waseda is secretly a Vocaloid producer who goes by the name Teishotoku-P (低所得P).
Rie "USB" Mikami (三上 理恵, Mikami Rie)
Voiced by: Sayaka Senbongi (Japanese); Avery Smithhart (English)
Portrayed by: Nazuna Iseri (2020 drama)
Kohaku Kujyo (久条 琥珀, Kujō Kohaku)
Voiced by: Reina Ueda (Japanese); Chaney Moore (English)
Portrayed by: Noa Kita (2020 drama)
Kohaku is Majo's twin sister who is completely the opposite of her.
Airi "Nora" Nobara (野原 愛莉, Nobara Airi)
Nora is a high school girl with poor social skills. She lives alone due to a desire to own cats, which could not be done in her parents' residence. Nora also works part-time as a convenience store clerk.
Utako "Hime" Nakamura (中村 詩子, Nakamura Utako)
Hime is high schoolgirl whose family runs a ramen shop. She is known at school for keeping a cute personality and often posts videos about fashion online. When Hime was in middle school, she was frequently bullied for having an unattractive appearance. Hime met Baka, who gave her the nickname "Hime" and helped inspire her father to improve their restaurant business, which was failing at the time.
Shiikyon (シーキョン)
Voiced by: Kaori Nazuka (Japanese); Olivia Swaysey (English)
Portrayed by: Risa Naito (2020 drama)
Shiikyon is the school's nurse on duty and fellow chunibyo of Yamai.
Peanut-P (ぴーなっつP, Pīnattsu-P)
Voiced by: Fukushi Ochiai (Japanese); Andrew Love (English)
Portrayed by: Hikomaro (2020 drama)
Masayoshi Suzuki (鈴木 正義, Suzuki Masayoshi)
Voiced by: Junichi Yanagita (Japanese); Blake Weir (English)
Portrayed by: Ryo Yokoyama (2020 drama)

== Media ==
=== Manga ===
The manga series began serialization on the Comic Newtype website in 2014. It has been collected into 16 tankōbon volumes as of June 10, 2026.

No.	Release date	ISBN
1	April 9, 2016	978-4-04-104171-0
2	November 10, 2016	978-4-04-105027-9
3	May 10, 2017	978-4-04-105634-9
4	November 10, 2018	978-4-04-107275-2
5	July 4, 2019	978-4-04-108217-1
6	July 4, 2019	978-4-04-108218-8
7	January 10, 2020	978-4-04-108925-5
8	September 10, 2020	978-4-04-109726-7
9	June 10, 2021	978-4-04-111183-3
10	December 9, 2022	978-4-04-113150-3
11	October 10, 2023	978-4-04-114211-0
12	March 8, 2024	978-4-04-114756-6
13	November 9, 2024	978-4-04-115720-6
14	July 10, 2025	978-4-04-116365-8
15	January 8, 2026	978-4-04-117118-9
16	June 10, 2026	978-4-04-117546-0

=== Anime ===
An anime television series adaptation was announced on November 1, 2018. The series was animated by Passione and directed by Hijiri Sanpei, with Takeo Takahashi as chief director, Masahiro Yokotani handling series composition, and Sachiko Yasuda designing the characters. Tomoki Kikuya composed the music. The series aired from July 5 to September 20, 2019, on AT-X, Tokyo MX, TVA, KBS, SUN, and BS11. Chinatsu Akasaki, Haruka Tomatsu, and Aki Toyosaki performed the series' opening theme song "Wa! Moon! Dass! Cry!" (輪! Moon! dass! cry!) as well as the series' ending theme song "Seishun no Reverb" (青春のリバーブ, Seishun no Ribābu; lit. 'Youth Reverb').

No.	Title	Original release date
1	"Amazing"; Transliteration: "Sugoi" (Japanese: すごい)	July 5, 2019
2	"Manga" (Japanese: まんが)	July 12, 2019
3	"Forgotten Item"; Transliteration: "Wasuremono" (Japanese: わすれもの)	July 19, 2019
4	"Majime" (Japanese: まじめ)	July 26, 2019
5	"Lily"; Transliteration: "Rirī" (Japanese: りりぃ)	August 2, 2019
6	"Majo" (Japanese: まじょ)	August 9, 2019
7	"Yamai" (Japanese: やまい)	August 16, 2019
8	"Buying Swimwear"; Transliteration: "Mizugikai" (Japanese: みずぎかい)	August 23, 2019
9	"Fashion"; Transliteration: "Oshare" (Japanese: おしゃれ)	August 30, 2019
10	"Robo" (Japanese: ろぼ)	September 6, 2019
11	"Dream"; Transliteration: "Yume" (Japanese: ゆめ)	September 13, 2019
12	"Friends"; Transliteration: "Nakama" (Japanese: なかま)	September 20, 2019

=== Drama ===
A live-action drama series premiered on TV Asahi on January 24, 2020. The series' theme song is "Starting Over" by Little Glee Monster.

No.	Title	Original air date
1	"Bend Your Knees! Hijiki!"; Transliteration: "Magare Hiza! Hijiki!" (Japanese: 曲がれヒザ! ヒジキ!)	January 24, 2020
2	"I Love Getting Wet While Fully-Dressed!"; Transliteration: "Chakui no Mama Nureru no ga Suki Nan desu!" (Japanese: 着衣のまま濡れるのが好きなんです!)	January 31, 2020
3	"The Value of Fresh-Removed Pants"; Transliteration: "Nugitate no Pantsu no Kachi" (Japanese: 脱ぎたてのパンツの価値)	February 7, 2020
4	"Love, Sesame Oil, and Exorcist"; Transliteration: "Koi to Gomaabura to Ekusoshisuto" (Japanese: 恋とごま油とエクソシスト)	February 14, 2020
5	"Consider the Feelings of the Unwanted Hair Too"; Transliteration: "Mudage no Kimochi mo Kangaero" (Japanese: ムダ毛の気持ちも考えろ)	February 21, 2020
6	"Sex Education of B (Buzz) L (Love)"; Transliteration: "Seikyōiku wa B (Bōzu) L (Rabu) de" (Japanese: 性教育はB（坊主）L（ラブ）で)	February 28, 2020
7	"The Idiot is Repeating a year: The Final Battle of JK High Schoolgirl"; Transliteration: "Baka, Ryūnen Surutteyo: Hanakuso JK Saigo no Tatakai" (Japanese: バカ、留年するってよハナクソJK最後の戦い)	March 6, 2020

== Reception ==
Gadget Tsūshin listed both "interesting woman", a phrase from the first episode, and Yamai in their 2019 anime buzzwords list.
