= Futari Saison =

- Regular edition cover. Each version A, B, C, and D has separate cover artwork.

Single by Keyakizaka46

from the album Masshiro na Mono wa Yogoshitaku naru
- A-side: "Futari Saison"
- B-side: "Otona wa Shinjite Kurenai" (Type-A, B, C); "Seifuku to Taiyō" (Type-A); "Dare Yori mo Takaku Tobe!" (Type-B); "Bokutachi no Sensou" (Type-C); "Yūhi 1/3" (Regular)
- Released: November 30, 2016 (Japan)
- Genre: J-pop
- Length: 4:48
- Label: Sony Records
- Songwriters: Yasushi Akimoto (lyrics); Kawata Soichiro, Sasaki Nozomu (music)
- Producer: Yasushi Akimoto

Keyakizaka46 singles chronology
"Sekai ni wa Ai Shika Nai" (2016)	"Futari Saison" (2016)	"Fukyōwaon" (2017)

Music video
- "Futari Saison" (Keyakizaka46 official ch.) "Futari Saison" (Sony Music Taiwan) "Futari Saison" (Keyakizaka46 Vevo) on YouTube

"Futari Saison" (二人セゾン, Futari Sezon; My Seasons Are Us) is the third single by the Japanese girl idol group Keyakizaka46. It was released in Japan on 30 November 2016 on the label Sony Records.

The center position in the choreography for the title song is held by Yurina Hirate.

The single was number-one on the Oricon Weekly Singles Chart, with 442,000 copies sold in the first week. As a female group debuted within a year, they broke over 400,000 sales record for the first time in 20 years and became the second group in the history following Puffy. It was also number-one on the Billboard Japan Hot 100.

== Release ==
It was released in 4 editions, Type-A, Type-B, Type-C and a regular edition. All editions, except the regular edition, include a DVD with music videos.

== Music video ==
The choreography for the title song was instructed by Takahiro Ueno. The music video was directed by Ryōhei Shingū. It was taken in a suburb of Tokyo for two days.

== Track listings ==
All lyrics written by Yasushi Akimoto.

=== Type-A ===
CD
No.	Title	Length
1.	"Futari Saison" (二人セゾン)	4:48
2.	"Otona wa Shinjite Kurenai" (大人は信じてくれない)	3:31
3.	"Seifuku to Taiyō" (制服と太陽)	4:10
4.	"Futari Saison (off vocal ver.)"	4:47
5.	"Otona wa Shinjite Kurenai (off vocal ver.)"	3:31
6.	"Seifuku to Taiyō (off vocal ver.)"	4:08

DVD
No.	Title	Length
1.	"Futari Saison Music Video"	5:15
2.	"Otona wa Shinjite Kurenai Music Video"	3:36
3.	"Nana Oda"	7:56
4.	"Minami Koike"	8:08
5.	"Fuyuka Saitō"	7:11
6.	"Mizuho Habu"	6:57
7.	"Yurina Hirate"	5:05
8.	"Akane Moriya"	3:14
9.	"Nanami Yonetani"	7:11
10.	"Rika Watanabe"	6:53

=== Type-B ===
CD
No.	Title	Length
1.	"Futari Saison" (二人セゾン)	4:48
2.	"Otona wa Shinjite Kurenai" (大人は信じてくれない)	3:31
3.	"Dare Yori mo Takaku Tobe!" (誰よりも高く跳べ!)	4:43
4.	"Futari Saison (off vocal ver.)"	4:47
5.	"Otona wa Shinjite Kurenai (off vocal ver.)"	3:31
6.	"Dare Yori mo Takaku Tobe (off vocal ver.)"	4:42

DVD
No.	Title	Length
1.	"Futari Saison Music Video"	5:15
2.	"Dare Yori mo Takaku Tobe! Music Video"	4:48
3.	"Nijika Ishimori"	5:06
4.	"Yui Imaizumi"	8:01
5.	"Rika Ozeki"	7:43
6.	"Yui Kobayashi"	6:55
7.	"Shiori Satō"	4:01
8.	"Yūka Sugai"	5:38
9.	"Miyu Suzumoto"	7:11
10.	"Aoi Harada"	4:33

=== Type-C ===
CD
No.	Title	Length
1.	"Futari Saison" (二人セゾン)	4:48
2.	"Otona wa Shinjite Kurenai" (大人は信じてくれない)	3:31
3.	"Bokutachi no Sensou" (僕たちの戦争)	4:15
4.	"Futari Saison (off vocal ver.)"	4:47
5.	"Otona wa Shinjite Kurenai (off vocal ver.)"	3:31
6.	"Bokutachi no Sensou (off vocal ver.)"	4:14

DVD
No.	Title	Length
1.	"Futari Saison Music Video"	5:15
2.	"Bokutachi no Sensou Music Video"	4:14
3.	"Rina Uemura"	7:58
4.	"Manaka Shida"	5:20
5.	"Nanako Nagasawa"	3:23
6.	"Risa Watanabe"	4:40
7.	"Neru Nagahama"	7:16
8.	"Hiragana Keyakizaka46"	20:32

=== Regular Edition ===
CD
No.	Title	Length
1.	"Futari Saison" (二人セゾン)	4:48
2.	"Otona wa Shinjite Kurenai" (大人は信じてくれない)	3:31
3.	"Yūhi 1/3" (夕陽1/3)	4:49
4.	"Futari Saison (off vocal ver.)"	4:47
5.	"Otona wa Shinjite Kurenai (off vocal ver.)"	3:31
6.	"Yūhi 1/3 (off vocal ver.)"	4:47

== Members ==
=== "Futari Saison" ===
Center: Yurina Hirate

- 1st row: Fuyuka Saitō, Shiori Satō, Minami Koike, Yurina Hirate, Aoi Harada, Miyu Suzumoto, Akane Moriya
- 2nd row: Yui Imaizumi, Yūka Sugai, Rika Watanabe, Neru Nagahama, Risa Watanabe, Manaka Shida, Yui Kobayashi
- 3rd row: Nana Oda, Rika Ozeki, Nanako Nagasawa, Rina Uemura, Nanami Yonetani, Nijika Ishimori, Mizuho Habu

=== "Otona wa Shinjite Kurenai" ===
- Nijika Ishimori, Yui Imaizumi, Rina Uemura, Rika Ozeki, Nana Oda, Minami Koike, Yui Kobayashi, Fuyuka Saitō, Shiori Satō, Manaka Shida, Yūka Sugai, Miyu Suzumoto, Nanako Nagasawa, Neru Nagahama, Mizuho Habu, Aoi Harada, Yurina Hirate, Akane Moriya, Nanami Yonetani, Rika Watanabe, Risa Watanabe

=== "Seifuku to Taiyō" ===
- Nijika Ishimori, Yui Imaizumi, Rina Uemura, Rika Ozeki, Nana Oda, Minami Koike, Yui Kobayashi, Fuyuka Saitō, Shiori Satō, Manaka Shida, Yūka Sugai, Miyu Suzumoto, Nanako Nagasawa, Neru Nagahama, Mizuho Habu, Aoi Harada, Yurina Hirate, Akane Moriya, Nanami Yonetani, Rika Watanabe, Risa Watanabe

=== "Dare Yori mo Takaku Tobe!" ===
Sung by Hiragana Keyakizaka46(Undergroup) members.

- Mao Iguchi, Sarina Ushio, Memi Kakizaki, Yūka Kageyama, Shiho Katō, Kyōko Saitō, Kumi Sasaki, Mirei Sasaki, Mana Takase, Ayaka Takamoto, Neru Nagahama, Mei Higashimura

=== "Bokutachi no Sensou" ===
Sung by the unit Five Cards consists of the following members.

- Rina Uemura, Nanako Nagasawa, Mizuho Habu, Rika Watanabe, Risa Watanabe

=== "Yūhi 1/3" ===
Sung by the unit Techi Neru Yui-chanzu consists of the following members.

- Yui Imaizumi, Yui Kobayashi, Neru Nagahama, Yurina Hirate

== Chart and certifications ==
=== Weekly charts ===
Chart (2016)	Peak position
Japan (Oricon Weekly Singles Chart)	1
Japan (Billboard Japan Hot 100)	1

=== Year-end charts ===
Chart (2016)	Peak position
Japan (Oricon Yearly Singles Chart)	11

=== Certifications ===
Region	Certification	Certified units/sales
Japan (RIAJ)	2× Platinum	500,000^{^}
^{^} Shipments figures based on certification alone.
