= Masshiro na Mono wa Yogoshitaku naru =

Studio album by Keyakizaka46
- Released: July 19, 2017
- Recorded: 2016–2017
- Genre: J-pop
- Label: Sony Records
- Producer: Yasushi Akimoto

Keyakizaka46 chronology
| Masshiro na Mono wa Yogoshitaku naru (2017) | Eien Yori Nagai Isshun: Ano Koro, Tashika ni Sonzaishita Watashitachi (2020) |

Singles from Masshiro na Mono wa Yogoshitaku naru
- 1. "Silent Majority" Released: April 6, 2016; 2. "Sekai ni wa Ai Shika Nai" Released: August 10, 2016; 3. "Futari Saison" Released: November 30, 2016; 4. "Fukyōwaon" Released: April 5, 2017

Masshiro na Mono wa Yogoshitaku naru (真っ白なものは汚したくなる, "Pure white things make you want to get dirty") is the first album by Keyakizaka46. It was released on July 19, 2017.

== Track listing ==
=== Disc 1 (Type-A・Type-B) ===
All lyrics are written by Yasushi Akimoto, Yurina Hirate.

CD
| No. | Title | Length |
|---|---|---|
| 1. | Untitled | 1:35 |
| 2. | "Silent Majority" (サイレントマジョリティー) | 4:25 |
| 3. | "Te wo Tsunaide Kaerouka" (手を繋いで帰ろうか; Let's go home holding hands) | 5:16 |
| 4. | "Kimi ga Inai" (キミガイナイ; You're not here) | 4:43 |
| 5. | "Sekai ni wa Ai Shika Nai" (世界には愛しかない; There is only love in the world) | 4:56 |
| 6. | "Kataru Nara Mirai wo…" (語るなら未来を…; If you talk about the future) | 3:52 |
| 7. | "Hiragana Keyaki" (ひらがなけやき) | 3:43 |
| 8. | "Futari Saison" (二人セゾン; Two person's season) | 4:48 |
| 9. | "Seifuku to Taiyō" (制服と太陽; Uniform and the Sun) | 4:10 |
| 10. | "Dare Yori mo Takaku Tobe!" (誰よりも高く跳べ!; Jump higher than anyone!) | 4:43 |
| 11. | "Otona wa Shinjitekurenai" (大人は信じてくれない; Adults won't believe) | 3:31 |
| 12. | "Fukyōwaon" (不協和音; Discord) | 4:09 |
| 13. | "Bokutachi wa Tsukiatteiru" (僕たちは付き合っている; We are dating) | 4:38 |
| 14. | "Eccentric" (エキセントリック) | 4:33 |
| 15. | "W-KEYAKIZAKA no Uta" (W-KEYAKIZAKAの詩; the song of the two Keyakizakas) | 5:08 |

=== Disc 2 (Type-A) ===
CD
| No. | Title | Length |
|---|---|---|
| 1. | "Getsuyoubi no Asa, Skirt wo Kirareta" (月曜日の朝、スカートを切られた; I cut my skirt on Monday morning) | 3:38 |
| 2. | "Shibuya Kara PARCO ga Kieta Hi" (渋谷からPARCOが消えた日; The day when PARCO disappeared from Shibuya) | 4:55 |
| 3. | "Shōjo ni wa Modorenai" (少女には戻れない; Cannot return to the girl) | 3:29 |
| 4. | "Noriokureta Bus" (乗り遅れたバス; Lost Bus) | 4:29 |
| 5. | "Tōkyō Tower wa Doko Kara Mieru?" (東京タワーはどこから見える?; Where can I see Tokyo Tower?) | 4:17 |
| 6. | "100nen Matteba" (100年待てば; If I wait 100 years) | 4:22 |
| 7. | "Chinmoku Shita Koibito yo" (沈黙した恋人よ; Silent lover) | 4:39 |
| 8. | "Tuning" (チューニング) | 4:48 |
| 9. | "Aozora ga Chigau" (青空が違う; The blue sky is wrong) | 4:51 |
| 10. | "Yūhi 1/3" (夕陽1/3; Sunset 1/3) | 4:49 |
| 11. | "Neko no Namae" (猫の名前; Cat's name) | 4:57 |
| 12. | "Taiyō wa Miageru Hito wo Erabanai" (太陽は見上げる人を選ばない; The sun doesn't choose anyone to look up) | 4:43 |
| 13. | "Abunakkashii Keikaku" (危なっかしい計画; Dangerous plan) | 4:10 |
| 14. | "Jibun no Kitsugi" (自分の棺; My coffin) | 4:26 |

=== Disc 2 (Type-B) ===
CD
| No. | Title | Length |
|---|---|---|
| 1. | "Getsuyoubi no Asa, Skirt wo Kirareta" | 3:38 |
| 2. | "Kimi wo Mō Sagasanai" (君をもう探さない; I won't look for you anymore) | 4:55 |
| 3. | "Shibuyagawa" (渋谷川; Shibuya River) | 4:52 |
| 4. | "Natsu no Hana wa Himawari Dake Ja Nai" (夏の花は向日葵だけじゃない; Summer flowers are not just sunflowers) | 4:23 |
| 5. | "1gyō Dake no Air Mail" (1行だけのエアメール; Single line airmail) | 3:38 |
| 6. | "AM1:27" | 4:06 |
| 7. | "Koko ni Nai Ashiato" (ここにない足跡; Footprints that are not here) | 4:10 |
| 8. | "Eien no Hakusen" (永遠の白線; Eternal white line) | 4:20 |
| 9. | "Ballet to Shōnen" (バレエと少年; Ballet and boy) | 3:41 |
| 10. | "Bokutachi no Sensō" (僕たちの戦争; Our war) | 4:15 |
| 11. | "Hohoemi ga Kanashii" (微笑みが悲しい; Smile is sad) | 4:55 |
| 12. | "Wareta Smartphone" (割れたスマホ; Broken smartphone) | 4:06 |
| 13. | "Abunakkashii Keikaku" | 4:08 |

=== Disc 3 (Type-A) ===
DVD
| No. | Title | Length |
|---|---|---|
| 1. | "Silent Majority Music Video" | 4:26 |
| 2. | "Sekai ni wa Ai Shika Nai Music Video" | 4:56 |
| 3. | "Futari Saison Music Video" | 5:15 |
| 4. | "Fukyōwaon Music Video" | 4:22 |
| 5. | "The Documentary of Ariake Coliseum" |

=== Disc 3 (Type-B) ===
DVD
| No. | Title | Length |
|---|---|---|
| 1. | "Eccentric Music Video" | 4:40 |
| 2. | "W-KEYAKIZAKA no Uta 32-people ver. Music Video" |
| 3. | "The Making of Silent Majority Music Video by Ikeda Kazuma" |
| 4. | "The Making of Sekai ni wa Ai Shika Nai Music Video by Ikeda Kazuma" |
| 5. | "The Making of Futari Saison Music Video by Shinguu Ryohei" |
| 6. | "The Making of Fukyōwaon Music Video by Shinguu Ryohei" |

=== Regular edition ===
CD
| No. | Title | Length |
|---|---|---|
| 1. | "Overture" | 1:35 |
| 2. | "Silent Majority" | 4:25 |
| 3. | "Te wo Tsunaide Kaerouka" | 5:16 |
| 4. | "Kimi ga Inai" | 4:43 |
| 5. | "Sekai ni wa Ai Shika Nai" | 4:56 |
| 6. | "Kataru Nara Mirai wo…" | 3:52 |
| 7. | "Hiragana Keyaki" | 3:43 |
| 8. | "Futari Saison" | 4:48 |
| 9. | "Seifuku to Taiyō" | 4:10 |
| 10. | "Dare Yori no Takaku Tobe!" | 4:43 |
| 11. | "Otona wa Shinjitekurenai" | 3:31 |
| 12. | "Fukyōwaon" | 4:09 |
| 13. | "Bokutachi wa Tsukiatteiru" | 4:38 |
| 14. | "Eccentric" | 4:33 |
| 15. | "W-KEYAKIZAKA no Uta" | 5:08 |
| 16. | "Getsuyoubi no Asa, Skirt wo Kirareta" | 3:38 |

== Chart ==
| Chart (2017) | Peak position |
|---|---|
| Japanese Albums (Oricon) | 1 |

== Accolade ==
| Year | Ceremony | Award | Result |
|---|---|---|---|
| 2018 | CD Shop Awards | Finalist Award | Won |
