= Rika Watanabe =

Japanese former singer and model

- 渡辺 梨加
- Born: 16 May 1995 (age 31); Ibaraki Prefecture, Japan
- Occupations: Former idol and model
- Years active: 2015–2022
- Modeling information
- Height: 166 cm (5 ft 5 in)
- Hair color: black
- Eye color: black
- Musical career
- Years active: 2015–2022
- Formerly of: Sakurazaka46

Rika Watanabe (渡辺 梨加, Watanabe Rika; born 16 May 1995) is a former member of the Japanese girl group Sakurazaka46. She also served as a regular model for the fashion magazine LARME and an exclusive model for the fashion magazine Ray.

== Biography ==
Born on 16 May 1995 in Ibaraki Prefecture, Watanabe passed first generation member audition of Keyakizaka46 on August 21, 2015, and started her activities.

On 6 May 2017, she made her runway debut at the fashion and music event GirlsAward 2017 SPRING ／ SUMMER, held at the Yoyogi National Gymnasium. She is also part of the subgroup Aozora to Marry (青空とMARRY) along with Risa Watanabe, Akane Moriya, Yūka Sugai and Manaka Shida. As part of the subunit, Watanabe made appearances in three songs: "Aozora Chigau" in "Sekai ni wa Ai Shika Nai", "Wareta Sumaho" in "Fukyōwaon, and "Namiuchigiwa o Hashiranai ka?" in "Kaze ni Fukarete mo".

On 10 July 2017, LARME announced that she will be one of the magazine's regular model.

On 16 November 2017, Ray announced that she will be one of the magazine's exclusive model.

== Personal life ==
She is nicknamed Berika (ベリカ), Rika (りか), and Pe-chan (ペーちゃん).

She is close with Risa Watanabe, who from also from Ibaraki and shares the same family name. Fans call them collectively as "W Watanabe" or "Beri Beri". and is also close with Nagasawa Nanako and Neru Nagahama, and are well known among fans as Hotoke-zu.

She has a distinctive disposition, and her whale shark plush "AOKO" from the Okinawa Churaumi Aquarium has become popular among fans.

=== Skills ===
Her special skills are playing the piano and Japanese calligraphy (shodō).

=== Hobbies ===
Her hobbies are visiting neko cafes, shopping, sleeping, and looking up a place with good food and eating there. She has decided to eat curry on Thursdays.

=== Marriage ===
Watanabe announced her marriage in March 2026 and her first pregnancy in September that year.

== Discography ==
=== Singles ===
Keyakizaka46

Year	Title
2016	Silent Majority
2016	Te o Tsunaide Kaerou ka
2016	Kimigainai
2016	Sekai ni wa Ai Shika Nai
2016	Katarunara Mirai o...
2016	Aozora ga Chigau
2016	Futari Saison
2016	Otona wa Shinjite Kurenai
2016	Seifuku to Taiyou
2016	Bokutachi no Sensou
2017	Fukyōwaon
2017	W-Keyakizaka no Uta
2017	Wareta Smartphone
2017	Eccentric
2017	Kaze ni Fukarete mo
2017	Hiraishin
2017	Namiuchigiwa o Hashiranai ka
2018	Garasu wo Ware
2018	Mou Mori e Kaerou ka
2018	Ambivalent
2018	Student Dance
2018	I'm Out
2019	Kuroi Hitsuji
2019	Nobody

Sakamichi AKB

Year	Title	Ref.
2017	Dare no Koto wo Ichiban Aishiteru?	

== Filmography ==
=== Television series ===
Year	Title
2017	KeyaBingo!
2017	Tokuyama Daigorō o Dare ga Koroshita ka?

=== Events ===
Year	Title	Ref.
2017	GirlsAward 2017 Spring / Summer	
2017	Girls Award 2017 Autumn/Winter	
2017	Tokyo Girls Collection 2017 Autumn/Winter	
2017	Tokyo Girls Collection Hiroshima 2017	
2018	Tokyo Girls Collection 2018 Spring/Summer	
2018	Girls Award 2018 Spring/Summer	
2018	Girls Award 2018 Autumn/Winter	
2019	Tokyo Girls Collection Shizuoka 2019	
2019	Tokyo Girls Collection 2019 Spring/Summer	
2019	Tokyo Girls Collection Kumamoto 2019	

== Bibliography ==
=== Magazine Serializations ===
Title	Ref.
Ray	

=== Photobook Release ===
On October 11, 2017, it was announced that Rika Watanabe will release her first photo collection. She became the first member in Keyakizaka46 to have a photobook.

Title	First week sales	Reference
饒舌な眼差し (Talkative look)		
