= Sekai ni wa Ai Shika Nai =

- Regular edition cover. Each version A, B, C, and D has separate cover artwork.

Single by Keyakizaka46

from the album Masshiro na Mono wa Yogoshitaku naru
- A-side: "Sekai ni wa Ai Shika Nai"
- B-side: "Kataru Nara Mirai o..." (Type-A,B,C); "Shibuya Kara Parco ga Kieta Hi" (Type-A); "Mata Atte Kudasai" (Type-B); "Aozora ga Chigau" (Type-C); "Bob Dylan wa Kaesanai" (Regular); "Hiragana Keyaki" (Regular)
- Released: August 10, 2016 (Japan)
- Genre: J-pop
- Length: 4:56
- Label: Sony Records
- Songwriters: Yasushi Akimoto (lyrics); Yūsuke Shirato (music)
- Producer: Yasushi Akimoto

Keyakizaka46 singles chronology
| "Silent Majority" (2016) | "Sekai ni wa Ai Shika Nai" (2016) | "Futari Saison" (2016) |

Music video
- "Sekai ni wa Ai Shika Nai" (Keyakizaka46 official ch.) "Sekai ni wa Ai Shika Nai" (Sony Music Taiwan) "Sekai ni wa Ai Shika Nai" (Keyakizaka46 Vevo) on YouTube

"Sekai ni wa Ai Shika Nai" (世界には愛しかない; There is only love in the world) is the second single by the Japanese girl idol group Keyakizaka46. It was released in Japan on 10 August 2016 on the label Sony Records. The song was used as the theme song of their mystery and comedy drama Tokuyama Daigorō o Dare ga Koroshita ka? (徳山大五郎を誰が殺したか?; Who did kill Daigorō Tokuyama?) that premiered on TV Tokyo on 16 July 2016.

The center position in the choreography for the title song is held by Yurina Hirate.

The single was number-one on the Oricon Weekly Singles Chart, with 323,066 copies sold. It was also number-one on the Billboard Japan Hot 100.

== Release ==
It was released in 4 editions, Type-A, Type-B, Type-C and a regular edition. All editions, except the regular edition, include a DVD with music videos. Type-A includes Yurina Hirate's solo song Shibuya Kara Parco ga Kieta Hi.

== Music video ==
The choreography for the title track was created by Takahiro Ueno. The music video for it was directed by Kazuma Ikeda and shot in Hokkaidō.

== Track listings ==
All lyrics written by Yasushi Akimoto.

=== Type-A ===
CD
| No. | Title | Length |
|---|---|---|
| 1. | "Sekai ni wa Ai Shika Nai" (世界には愛しかない) | 4:56 |
| 2. | "Kataru Nara Mirai o..." (語るなら未来を…) | 3:52 |
| 3. | "Shibuya Kara Parco ga Kieta Hi" (渋谷からPARCOが消えた日) | 4:55 |
| 4. | "Sekai ni wa Ai Shika Nai (off vocal ver.)" | 4:56 |
| 5. | "Kataru Nara Mirai o... (off vocal ver.)" | 3:52 |
| 6. | "Shibuya Kara Parco ga Kieta Hi (off vocal ver.)" | 4:54 |

DVD
| No. | Title | Length |
|---|---|---|
| 1. | "Sekai ni wa Ai Shika Nai Music Video" | 5:06 |
| 2. | "Shibuya Kara Parco ga Kieta Hi Music Video" | 5:18 |
| 3. | "Nijika Ishimori" | 4:12 |
| 4. | "Rika Ozeki" | 5:38 |
| 5. | "Manaka Shida" | 3:48 |
| 6. | "Mizuho Habu" | 3:23 |
| 7. | "Akane Moriya" | 6:10 |
| 8. | "Rika Watanabe" | 4:57 |
| 9. | "Risa Watanabe" | 3:26 |

=== Type-B ===
CD
| No. | Title | Length |
|---|---|---|
| 1. | "Sekai ni wa Ai Shika Nai" (世界には愛しかない) | 4:56 |
| 2. | "Kataru Nara Mirai o..." (語るなら未来を…) | 3:52 |
| 3. | "Mata Atte Kudasai" (また会ってください) | 4:33 |
| 4. | "Sekai ni wa Ai Shika Nai (off vocal ver.)" | 4:56 |
| 5. | "Kataru Nara Mirai o... (off vocal ver.)" | 3:52 |
| 6. | "Mata Atte Kudasai (off vocal ver.)" | 4:31 |

DVD
| No. | Title | Length |
|---|---|---|
| 1. | "Sekai ni wa Ai Shika Nai Music Video" | 5:06 |
| 2. | "Mata Atte Kudasai Music Video" | 6:55 |
| 3. | "Yui Imaizumi" | 4:10 |
| 4. | "Minami Koike" | 5:03 |
| 5. | "Yui Kobayashi" | 4:08 |
| 6. | "Shiori Satō" | 7:11 |
| 7. | "Yūka Sugai" | 3:20 |
| 8. | "Aoi Harada" | 3:41 |
| 9. | "Nanami Yonetani" | 5:50 |

=== Type-C ===
CD
| No. | Title | Length |
|---|---|---|
| 1. | "Sekai ni wa Ai Shika Nai" (世界には愛しかない) | 4:56 |
| 2. | "Kataru Nara Mirai o..." (語るなら未来を…) | 3:52 |
| 3. | "Aozora ga Chigau" (青空が違う) | 4:51 |
| 4. | "Sekai ni wa Ai Shika Nai (off vocal ver.)" | 4:56 |
| 5. | "Kataru Nara Mirai o... (off vocal ver.)" | 3:52 |
| 6. | "Aozora ga Chigau (off vocal ver.)" | 4:50 |

DVD
| No. | Title | Length |
|---|---|---|
| 1. | "Sekai ni wa Ai Shika Nai Music Video" | 5:06 |
| 2. | "Kataru Nara Mirai o... Music Video" | 4:06 |
| 3. | "Rina Uemura" | 6:16 |
| 4. | "Nana Oda" | 6:28 |
| 5. | "Fuyuka Saitō" | 7:16 |
| 6. | "Miyu Suzumoto" | 4:37 |
| 7. | "Nanako Nagasawa" | 7:06 |
| 8. | "Yurina Hirate" | 7:23 |
| 9. | "Neru Nagahama" | 3:22 |

=== Regular Edition ===
CD
| No. | Title | Length |
|---|---|---|
| 1. | "Sekai ni wa Ai Shika Nai" (世界には愛しかない) | 4:56 |
| 2. | "Bob Dylan wa Kaesanai" (ボブディランは返さない) | 4:53 |
| 3. | "Hiragana Keyaki" (ひらがなけやき) | 3:43 |
| 4. | "Sekai ni wa Ai Shika Nai (off vocal ver.)" | 4:56 |
| 5. | "Bob Dylan wa Kaesanai (off vocal ver.)" | 4:53 |
| 6. | "Hiragana Keyaki (off vocal ver.)" | 3:41 |

== Members ==
=== "Sekai ni wa Ai Shika Nai" ===
Center: Yurina Hirate

- 1st row: Manaka Shida, Rika Watanabe, Yurina Hirate, Risa Watanabe, Yui Imaizumi
- 2nd row: Mizuho Habu, Neru Nagahama, Yūka Sugai, Akane Moriya, Miyu Suzumoto, Yui Kobayashi
- 3rd row: Nana Oda, Fuyuka Saitō, Aoi Harada, Rina Uemura, Nanako Nagasawa, Minami Koike, Rika Ozeki, Nanami Yonetani, Shiori Satō, Nijika Ishimori

=== "Kataru Nara Mirai o..." ===
- Nijika Ishimori, Yui Imaizumi, Rina Uemura, Rika Ozeki, Nana Oda, Minami Koike, Yui Kobayashi, Fuyuka Saitō, Shiori Satō, Manaka Shida, Yūka Sugai, Miyu Suzumoto, Nanako Nagasawa, Mizuho Habu, Aoi Harada, Yurina Hirate, Akane Moriya, Nanami Yonetani, Rika Watanabe, Risa Watanabe, Neru Nagahama

=== "Shibuya Kara Parco ga Kieta Hi" ===
- Yurina Hirate

=== "Mata Atte Kudasai" ===
- Neru Nagahama

=== "Aozora ga Chigau" ===
- Manaka Shida, Yūka Sugai, Akane Moriya, Rika Watanabe, Risa Watanabe

=== "Bob Dylan wa Kaesanai" ===
- Yui Imaizumi, Yui Kobayashi

=== "Hiragana Keyaki" ===
- Mao Iguchi, Sarina Ushio, Memi Kakizaki, Yūka Kageyama, Shiho Katō, Kyōko Saitō, Kumi Sasaki, Mirei Sasaki, Mana Takase, Ayaka Takamoto, Neru Nagahama, Mei Higashimura

== Chart and certifications ==
=== Weekly charts ===
| Chart (2016) | Peak position |
|---|---|
| Japan (Oricon Weekly Singles Chart) | 1 |
| Japan (Billboard Japan Hot 100) | 1 |

=== Year-end charts ===
| Chart (2016) | Peak position |
|---|---|
| Japan (Oricon Yearly Singles Chart) | 13 |
| Billboard Japan Hot100 | 32 |

=== Certifications ===
| Region | Certification | Certified units/sales |
|---|---|---|
| Japan (RIAJ) Physical single | Platinum | 250,000^{^} |
| Japan (RIAJ) Digital single | Gold | 100,000^{*} |
^{*} Sales figures based on certification alone.^{^} Shipments figures based on certification alone.
