= Manamo Miyata =

Japanese author and media personality

- 宮田 愛萌
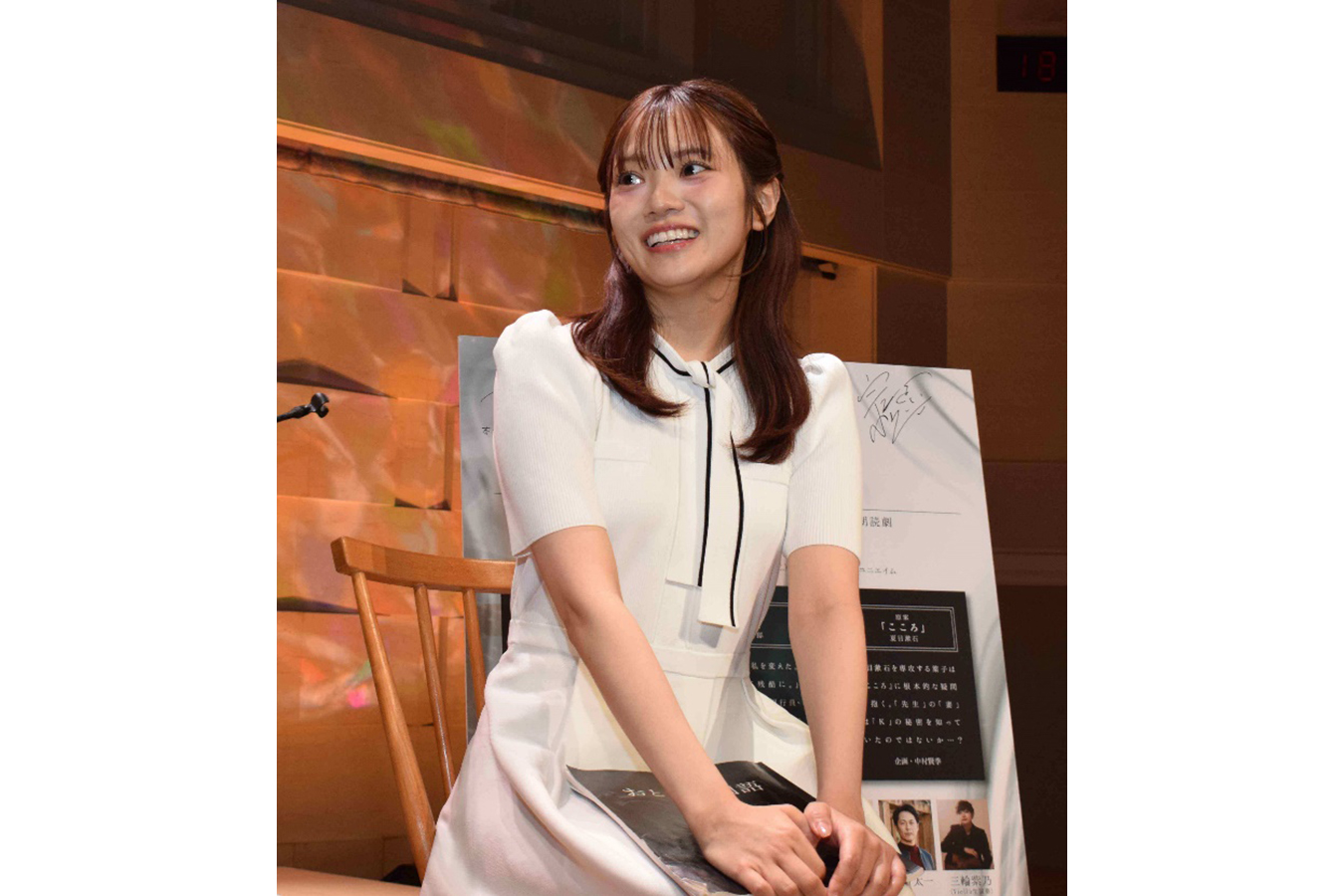
- Miyata in 2025
- Born: April 28, 1998 (age 28); Komae, Tokyo, Japan
- Education: Faculty of Letters, Kokugakuin University
- Occupations: Author; media personality
- Height: 159 cm (5 ft 3 in)
- Musical career
- Years active: 2017–2022
- Label: Sony Music
- Formerly of: Hinatazaka46

YouTube information
- Channel: Easy Going
- Years active: 2024–present
- Genres: Literature; travel
- Subscribers: 22,800
- Views: 276,908
- Last updated: 13 September 2025
- Website: Official website

Manamo Miyata (Japanese: 宮田 愛萌, Hepburn: Miyata Manamo; born April 28, 1998) is a Japanese author and media personality. She is a former second generation member of the idol group Hinatazaka46.

== Career ==
=== 2017–2022: Early career with Hinatazaka46 ===
On August 13, 2017, Miyata passed the auditions for new members of Keyakizaka46's subgroup Hiragana Keyakizaka46, now Hinatazaka46. In the group, she was known for her cutesy persona, known in Japan as burikko, which she often displayed in the group's television shows. Her fandom name is "Team Hemoglobin" (チームヘモグロビン; "Team Hb" for short).

Miyata enjoys reading and frequently recommends books to other Hinatazaka46 members. She extensively studied the classic poem collection Man'yōshū in university and excelled in the literary segments of the group's television shows, such as writing short stories and comparing the members to characters in The Tale of Genji. These appearances led to her first published literary work, the short story "Senbō" (羨望; lit. 'Envy'), which is part of the collection Saiteina Deai, Saikō no Koi (最低な出会い、最高の恋; lit. 'The Worst Encounter, The Best Love') along with stories by voice actress Shiina Natsukawa and comedian Matsumoto Club, compiled by the literature social networking service Monogatary.com and published digitally in December 2018.

Miyata went on hiatus in November 2020 due to health reasons and returned for Hinatazaka46's second anniversary concert in March 2021. During her hiatus, she graduated from the Faculty of Letters, Kokugakuin University, and also obtained her librarian certification.

Miyata was one of 15 entertainment figures who offered book recommendations as part of the 15th anniversary celebration of Kobunsha Classics New Translation Collection in November 2021, in which she endorsed the twelfth century short story The Lady who Loved Insects. She expanded to tanka poetry by participating in the fourth "Idol Tanka Party" (アイドル歌会, Idol Utakai), organized by specialty publisher Tanka Kenkyū-sha (短歌研究社; lit. 'Tanka Study Society'). An admirer of voice actress and singer Kaori Ishihara, she was featured in the dialogue and photo sections of Ishihara's photobook, titled Terminal and released in March 2022.

On September 7, 2022, Miyata announced that she would leave Hinatazaka46 due to health concerns and would be absent from the concert tour "Happy Smile Tour 2022". She did not participate in the music recording for the single "Tsuki to Hoshi ga Odoru Midnight", but appeared in the bonus content videos. On December 18, she appeared during the encore of the Hinakuri (Hinatazaka Christmas) 2022 concert to make her farewell speech and perform "Joyful Love" for the last time with the group.

=== 2023–present: Solo career ===
Miyata's photo and story collection book, titled Kirakirashi (きらきらし; lit. 'Glittering'), was published by Shinchosha on February 28, 2023. It consists of five stories inspired by the Man'yōshū and photos taken in Nara Prefecture, the "capital" of Man'yōshū. The book was reprinted three days after its release. In an interview with author Akane Chihaya, Miyata revealed that the book was written in only three months and that the second story, Beniume-iro, had to be shortened to around 40 percent of its original length to meet the publisher's requirements.

From late 2023 to August 2026, Miyata served as brand ambassador for the Butter Queen (バターの女王, Batā no Jo-ō) cookie brand. She was succeeded by fellow former Hinatazaka46 member Mirei Sasaki.

On April 28, 2025, her 27th birthday, Miyata launched a subscription-based photobook project, titled #6E0304 after the Web color code for a shade of blood red, where subscribers would receive photobooks of different themes every month for a year. Several photo exhibitions based on the project have been held. Her fourth fiction book, titled Oishii wa Yasashii (おいしいはやさしい; lit. 'Delicious is Kind'), was published by PHP Institute the same year. It depicts the relationship of four women with food and was inspired by her own experiences with dieting.

Miyata released another photobook in 2026, titled Lilas and published by Gentosha on January 28. It was photographed in Cebu, Philippines, where Miyata had taken part in a short overseas study program as a high school student, and was meant to capture the "beauty" of her physique before she turned 30. It placed third on the Oricon Weekly Photobook charts with around 3600 copies sold.

Miyata participated in several promotional events for Toyama Prefecture, especially the city of Takaoka, which is historically tied to Ōtomo no Yakamochi, the compiler of the Man'yōshū. She starred in the Toyama Television special program Reiwa's Yakamochi in May, in which she visits the city's historical sites and provides modern translations of the ancient poems, and delivered the opening recitation in the Takaoka Manyo Festival, an event celebrating the Man'yōshū, at the Takaoka Old Castle Park in October 2026. She also starred in an October campaign promoting the prefecture's public transportation.

== Reception ==
In a 2022 interview, author Akane Chihaya praised Miyata's writing in Kirakirashi as beautiful, with a "sense of transparency" and "vivid" sensory descriptions of the atmosphere, the season, and physical touch.

Gentosha editor Misato Kurokawa named Miyata as the author to watch in 2025.

Excerpts from Haru, Deai were included in the 2025 Japanese language entrance examinations for Tsukuba University High School and Rikkyo Niiza Junior High School.

== Personal life ==
Miyata hails from Komae, Tokyo, and is an only child. Her interests include reading classical literature and collecting Japanese temple and shrine stamps (御朱印, goshuin). She respects Akane Moriya, a former member of Sakurazaka46.

== Bibliography ==
| Title | Release date | Publisher | Identifier | Remark |
|---|---|---|---|---|
| Saiteina Deai, Saikō no Koi (最低な出会い、最高の恋; lit. 'The Worst Encounter, The Best Love') | 2018 | Sony Music Entertainment Japan | ASIN B0847M3439 | Short story collection; contributed the story "Senbō" (羨望; lit. 'Envy') |
| Kirakirashi (きらきらし; lit. 'Sparkling') | February 28, 2023 | Shinchosha | ISBN 978-4103549413 | Short story collection |
| Blanc/Noir | April 12, 2024 | Self-published | | Photobook; released with two titles but same content |
| Ayafuya de, Futashi kana (あやふやで、不確かな; lit. 'Vague and Uncertain, Maybe') | April 17, 2024 | Gentosha | ISBN 978-4344042599 | Novel |
| Haru, Deai (春、出逢い; lit. 'Spring, Encounter') | August 2024 | Kodansha | ISBN 978-4065363003 | Novel |
| Watashi no Otome (わたしのをとめ; lit. 'My Maiden') | April 21, 2025 | Tanka Kenkyū-sha | ISBN 978-4862728012 | Tanka poetry and photo collection |
| #6E0304 | 2025 | para,inc/FARM inc | | Photobook series, subscription-based |
| Oishii wa Yasashii (おいしいはやさしい; lit. 'Delicious is Kind') | 2025 | PHP Institute | ISBN 978-4569859842 | Novel |
| Lilas | January 28, 2026 | Gentosha | ISBN 978-4344045477 | Photobook |
| Natsu Made ni (夏までに; lit. 'Until Summer') | August 2026 | Kodansha | ISBN 9784065443026 | |

== Filmography ==
External videos
- Reiwa’s Yakamochi: Manamo Miyata’s Super-Translation of the Man’yōshū on YouTube
- Culture Club Correspondent, Manamo Miyata playlist on YouTube

=== Television ===
- Reiwa's Yakamochi, television special, May 9, 2026

=== Web series ===
- Culture Club Correspondent, Manamo Miyata (文化部特派員「宮田愛萌」), 2024–present

== Radio ==
- Hon no Kimochi (ほんのキモチ; lit. 'Real Feelings' or 'The Feelings of Books'), Japan FM Network, 2026–present

== Theater ==
| Year | Title | Role(s) | Venue(s) | Ref(s) |
|---|---|---|---|---|
| 2018 | Ayumi | Multiple | AiiA 2.5 Theater Tokyo | |

== Discography ==
Miyata's notable contributions to Hiragana Keyakizaka46 and Hinatazaka46's discography include:

- "Warenai Shabondama" (割れないシャボン玉; lit. 'Unbreakable Soap Bubbles') (2018, released on Hashiridasu Shunkan), unit (subgroup) song
