= Yui Imaizumi =

Japanese actress, singer, model, and television personality

- 今泉 佑唯
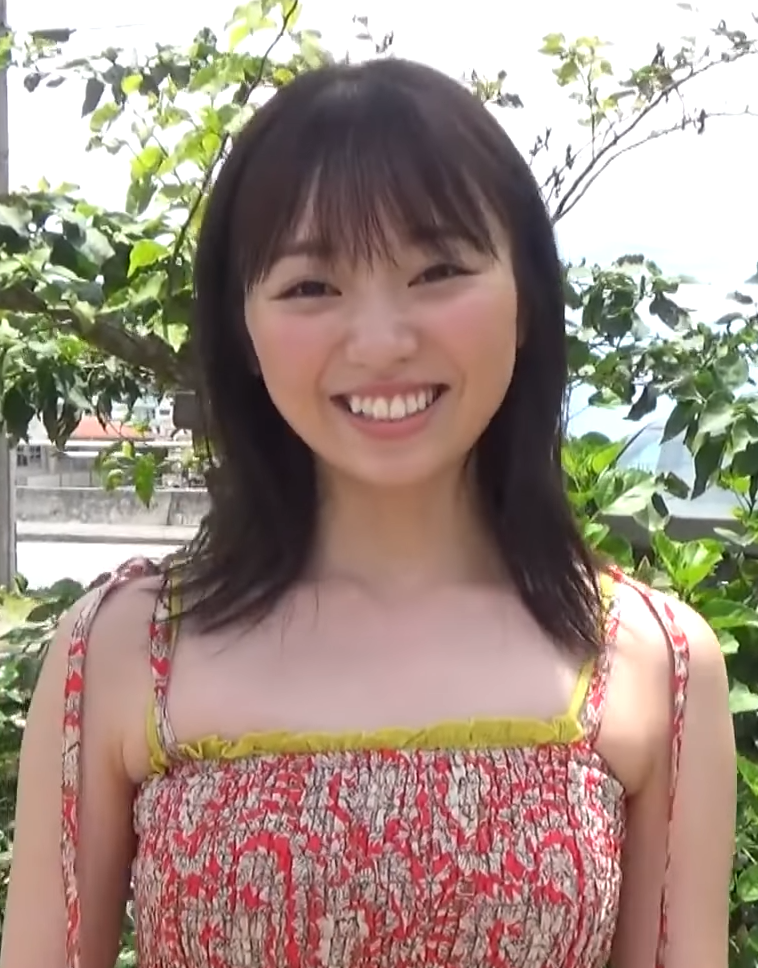
- Yui Imaizumi in 2019
- Born: September 30, 1998 (age 27); Kanagawa Prefecture, Japan
- Occupations: Actress; singer; model; television personality
- Years active: 2011–2012; 2015–2022; 2025–present
- Agent: Seju
- Partner: Mahoto Watanabe (2021–2024)
- Children: 1
- Musical career
- Also known as: Yui Kashiwagi
- Years active: 2011–2012 (Smile Gakuen); 2015–2018 (Keyakizaka46); 2019–2022 (solo career)
- Formerly of: Keyakizaka46; Smile Gakuen
- Website: Official website

Yui Imaizumi (今泉 佑唯, Imaizumi Yui; born September 30, 1998) is a Japanese actress, singer, model, and television personality. She rose to prominence as a founding member of the girl group Keyakizaka46 (now Sakurazaka46). Beyond her musical career, she entered the fashion industry, serving as a regular model for the fashion magazine Ar. After departing the group in 2018, she pursued acting and stage work, including lead roles in the series Million Joe (2019) and stage plays Azumi (2020) and Lady Snowblood (2021). She briefly stepped away from the spotlight in 2022 for health and personal reasons before returning to the entertainment industry in 2025.

== Career ==
=== Early career ===
In 2011, Imaizumi was a member of the underground idol group Smile Gakuen (スマイル学園) under the name Yui Kashiwagi (柏木佑井), also known as "Yuiful" Kashiwagi (ゆいふるの柏木). She left the group in March 2012.

=== 2015–2018: Keyakizaka46 ===
On August 21, 2015, Imaizumi along with 22 other members were announced for the newly created idol group, Toriizaka46 (later Keyakizaka46). Imaizumi made her musical debut with Keyakizaka46's first single, "Silent Majority". She formed a duo named "Yuichanzu" (ゆいちゃんず) with Yui Kobayashi due to the fact that they share the same name and play the guitar. After debuting with the B-side "Shibuyagawa" (渋谷川) on "Silent Majority", the duo continued performing after positive fan feedback. Additionally, Imaizumi made two song appearances as part of Sakamichi AKB (坂道AKB), a group made of various AKB48 and Sakamichi members. Aside from music, Imaizumi also started her modeling career, becoming a regular model for the fashion magazine Ar and published a solo photobook titled Daremo Shiranai Watashi (誰も知らない私; lit. 'The Me Who Nobody Knows').

In April 2017, Imaizumi took a temporary leave from the group due to poor health and returned in August the same year. She took another break in December.

After the release of "Ambivalent", Imaizumi officially departed from the group on November 5, 2018, during a farewell ceremony in Kyoto, expressing her desire to pursue other forms of entertainment. She became the third member to leave the group, and the first member to leave since their musical debut.

=== 2019–2022: Solo career and retirement ===
In January, Imaizumi changed her management company from Sony Music Japan to Avex Group. Her first independent acting role was in the stage play Atami Satsujin Jiken (熱海殺人事件). Since then, Imaizumi has been involved in many different projects. She was featured in a variety show produced by TV Asahi titled Imaizumi Yui no Otonajoshi (今泉佑唯のオトナ女子; lit. 'Yui Imaizumi's Adult Woman'), was a regular on the MBS Radio show Appare Yattemasu! (アッパレやってまーす!), starred in the 2020 movie A Life Turned Upside Down: My Dad's an Alcoholic (酔うと化け物になる父がつらい, Yōtobakemono ni Naruchichi ga Tsurai), and performed in a stage adaptation of the manga Azumi.

On July 4, 2021, Imaizumi ended her contract with Avex and became an independent talent. She launched her official blog on September 30.

In November 2021, Imaizumi portrayed the title character in the stage adaptation of the manga Lady Snowblood and performed the theme song, which was released digitally. She continued the role in the sequel in February 2022.

In September 2022, it was announced that Imaizumi had been suffering with hearing loss. She still appeared in the stage play Saigo no Isha wa Sakura wo Miagete Kimi wo Omou that month as scheduled, although in a different role.

On October 26, Imaizumi announced her retirement from the entertainment industry, citing concerns about the media's intrusion to the private lives of her family and child. She also revealed that she had been diagnosed with mild squamous intraepithelial lesions.

=== 2025: Return to entertainment ===
On March 18, 2025, Shueisha Online reported that Imaizumi would return to the entertainment industry as a freelance talent, with a radio appearance scheduled on March 29. On April 28, it was announced that she had joined the talent agency 1623, LLC. The music video for her first song after her comeback, "Ashiato" (足跡; lit. 'Footprints'), which lyrics she also wrote, was released on April 29. On October 6, she announced that she had transferred agencies to Seju.

== Personal life ==
Imaizumi has four older brothers and is the youngest child in her family.

In January 2021, Imaizumi announced her pregnancy and upcoming marriage to then-YouTuber and rapper Mahoto Watanabe. She gave birth to a daughter on June 25, 2021. However, due to Watanabe's arrest, Imaizumi announced that she would not be registering her marriage to him and would raise her child with the help of her family.

== Discography ==
=== Keyakizaka46 ===
Year	Single	Song	Notes
2016	"Silent Majority"	"Silent Majority" (サイレントマジョリティー)	
2016	"Silent Majority"	"Te o Tsunaide Kaerōka" (手を繋いで帰ろうか)	
2016	"Silent Majority"	"Shibuyagawa" (渋谷川)	As "Yuichanzu" with Yui Kobayashi
2016	"Silent Majority"	"Noriokureta Bus" (乗り遅れたバス)	With Yurina Hirate, Yui Kobayashi, Miyu Suzumoto, and Rika Watanabe
2016	"Silent Majority"	"Kimi ga Inai" (キミガイナイ)	
2016	"Sekai ni wa Ai Shika Nai"	"Sekai ni wa Ai Shika Nai" (世界には愛しかない)	
2016	"Sekai ni wa Ai Shika Nai"	"Kataru Nara Mirai o..." (語るなら未来を…)	
2016	"Sekai ni wa Ai Shika Nai"	"Bob Dylan wa Kaesanai" (ボブディランは返さない)	As "Yuichanzu" with Yui Kobayashi
2016	"Futari Saison"	"Futari Saison" (二人セゾン)	
2016	"Futari Saison"	"Otona wa Shinjite Kurenai" (大人は信じてくれない)	
2016	"Futari Saison"	"Seifuku to Taiyō" (制服と太陽)	
2016	"Futari Saison"	"Yuuhi 1/3" (夕陽1/3)	With Yurina Hirate, Yui Kobayashi, and Neru Nagahama
2017	"Fukyōwaon"	"Fukyōwaon" (不協和音)	
2017	"Fukyōwaon"	"W-KEYAKIZAKA no Uta" (W-KEYAKIZAKAの詩)	
2017	"Fukyōwaon"	"Tuning"	As "Yuichanzu" with Yui Kobayashi
2017	"Fukyōwaon"	"Eccentric" (エキセントリック)	
2017	"Kaze ni Fukarete mo"	"Kaze ni Fukarete mo" (風に吹かれても)	
2017	"Kaze ni Fukarete mo"	"Hiraishin" (避雷針)	
2017	"Kaze ni Fukarete mo"	"Saisei Suru Saibo" (再生する細胞)	Solo
2018	"Glass wo Ware!"	"Glass wo Ware!" (ガラスを割れ!)	
2018	"Glass wo Ware!"	"Mou Mori e Kaerou ka?" (もう森へ帰ろうか?)	
2018	"Glass wo Ware!"	"Zenmai Shikake no Yume" (ゼンマイ仕掛けの夢)	As "Yuichanzu" with Yui Kobayashi
2018	"Ambivalent"	"Hi ga Noboru Made" (日が昇るまで)	Solo

=== Sakamichi AKB ===
Year	Single	Song
2017	"Shoot Sign"	"Dare no Koto wo Ichiban Aishiteru?" (誰のことを一番愛してる?)
2018	"Jabaja"	"Kokkyo no Nai Jidai" (国境のない時代)

=== Solo career ===
Year	Single
2021	"Shurayuki"
2022	"Ame ga Yuki ni Kawaru" / "Shinku no Hana"
2025	"Ashiato"

== Filmography ==
=== Film ===
Year	Title	Role	Director(s)	Notes	Ref
2019	Brave Father Online: Our Story of Final Fantasy XIV	Kataoka	Teruo Noguchi		
2020	Rolling Marbles	Erika	Ken'ichi Ugana	Lead role	
2020	A Life Turned Upside Down: My Dad's an Alcoholic	Fumi Tadokoro	Kenji Katagiri		
2022	Tyida	Aki	Yūji Nakamae		

=== Television ===
Year	Title	Role	Network	Notes	Ref
2016	Tokuyama Daigorō o Dare ga Koroshitaka? (徳山大五郎を誰が殺したか?)	Herself	TV Tokyo		
2017	Zankoku na Kankyaku Tachi (残酷な観客達)	Erena Iwamoto	Nippon TV		
2018	Koi no Tsuki (恋のツキ)	Satoko Sakaki	TV Tokyo		
2019	The Good Wife (グッドワイフ)	Secretary	TBS	Episode 6	
2019	Million Joe (ミリオンジョー)	Mai Moriaki	TV Tokyo		
2019	Hidarikiki no Eren (左ききのエレン)	Yurina Mitsuhashi	MBS		
2020	Manatsu no Shōnen: 19452020 (真夏の少年〜19452020)	Yuma Muro	TV Asahi		

== Theater ==
Year	Title	Role	Notes	Ref
2019	Atami Satsujin Jiken	Tomoko Mizuno		
2020	Azumi	Azumi	Lead role	
2021	Lady Snowblood	Lady Snowblood	Lead role	
2022	Lady Snowblood and the Eight Rogues	Lady Snowblood	Lead role	
