= Shiho Katō =

Japanese singer and model

- 加藤 史帆
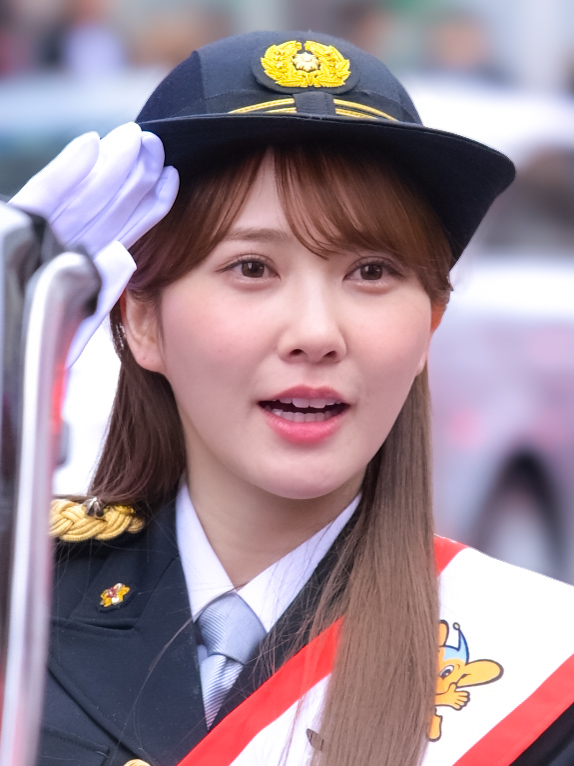
- Katō in February 2025
- Born: 2 February 1998 (age 28); Tokyo, Japan
- Occupations: Actress; model; television personality
- Years active: 2016–present
- Agent: Seed & Flower
- Musical career
- Genre: J-pop
- Years active: 2016–2024
- Label: Sony Music
- Formerly of: Hinatazaka46
- Modeling information
- Height: 160.5 cm (5 ft 3 in)
- Hair color: Brown
- Eye color: Black
- Website: Official website

Shiho Katō (Japanese: 加藤 史帆, Hepburn: Katō Shiho) is a Japanese actress, model, and television personality. She is an exclusive model for the fashion magazine CanCam and starred as Ayaka Usagida in Ayaka Is in Love with Hiroko! (2024−2025).

Katō began her career as a member of girl group Hinatazaka46 (formerly Hiragana Keyakizaka46) from 2016 to 2024 and made her acting debut in the group's drama Re:Mind (2017). She served as lead performer for the group's single "Kimi Shika Katan" (2021) and was known as one of the group's strongest vocalists.

== Career ==
=== 2016−2018: Early career ===
Katō's musical career began on 11 May 2016, when she passed the auditions for the first generation of Keyakizaka46's subgroup Hiragana Keyakizaka46. Her first concert was on 28 October of the same year at Akasaka Blitz, where she performed Keyakizaka46's songs "Silent Majority" and "Sekai ni wa Ai Shika Nai", as well as Hiragana Keyakizaka46's own "Hiragana Keyaki". She made her television acting debut in the group's drama series Re:Mind (2017) on TV Tokyo and Netflix, portraying a character named after herself, and theater debut in the group's stage play Ayumi (2018).

In 2018, she became a center (lead performer) for the first time for "Happy Aura", released on the Keyakizaka46 single "Ambivalent". Her first solo song, "Otoko Tomodachi Dakara", was released on Hiragana Keyakizaka46's debut album Hashiridasu Shunkan (2018). She also represented Hiragana Keyakizaka46 in "Kokkyō no Nai Jidai", a collaboration song between the AKB48 Group and the Sakamichi Series franchises released under the group name SakamichiAKB and released on the AKB48 single "Jabaja" (2018). She and Kyōko Saitō were particularly recognized for their vocal abilities and were often assigned to the front rows of song formations on either side of the center, earning them the nickname "Strongest Symmetry" (最強シンメ, Saikyō Shinme) which remained popular throughout their tenure.

=== 2019−2024: Hinatazaka46 ===
Hiragana Keyakizaka46 was spun off from Keyakizaka46 and renamed to Hinatazaka46 in February 2019. Katō was again included in the lineup of another SakamichiAKB song, "Hatsukoi Door", released on the AKB48 single "Jiwaru Days" (2019). In 2021, she became the center for the fifth single title song, "Kimi Shika Katan". She performed two more solo songs, "Nageki no Delete" on "Kimi Shika Katan" and "Docchi ga Saki ni Iu?" on "Zettaiteki Dairokkan" (2024), making her the Hinatazaka46 member with the most solo songs released as of 2024.

Kato was the Tuesday regular co-host for the radio program Recommen! on Nippon Cultural Broadcasting from 2019 to 2023.

Katō made her runway model debut at the GirlsAward 2017 Autumn/Winter fashion show. Her regular modeling work began in February 2019 when she became an exclusive model for the fashion magazine CanCam. She appeared on the cover of the October edition with then-Nogizaka46 members Sayuri Matsumura and Mizuki Yamashita as the "Three Sakamichi Sisters".

Katō's first photobook, titled #Aitai, was released by Shogakukan on 20 June 2023, with photographs taken in Oahu, Hawaii, where she had fond memories from a childhood family vacation. It is the first Hinatazaka46 photobook produced overseas. (Note: Miho Watanabe's 2019 photobook, produced in New Zealand, was published when the group was still active as Hiragana Keyakizaka46.) It topped the Oricon Weekly Book Ranking for its release week with 46 thousand copies sold.

Katō's first drama appearance independent of Hinatazaka46 was in Shiyūgakuryokō (2021) on the streaming service Smash. In 2024, she appeared in Kore kara Haishin Hajimemasu (TX Network) and the yuri drama Ayaka Is in Love with Hiroko! (MBS TV), her first leading roles in terrestrial television dramas, co-starring with Kanna Mori.

On 6 August 2024, Katō announced that she would leave Hinatazaka46 after the promotions for the upcoming twelfth single have concluded, with plans to further her careers in acting and beauty and fashion. Her "graduation" ceremony took place at the Tokyo Dome on 25 December, as part of Hinatazaka46's national Happy Magical Tour 2024.

=== 2025−present: Solo career ===
Katō starred in Boku no Azatoi Motokano, a drama series expanding on the TV Asahi romance short drama/talk show series Azatokute Nani ga Warui no?, which started airing in January 2025. She also reprised her role as Ayaka Usagida in the second season of Ayaka Is in Love with Hiroko!, released in June 2025.

== Image ==
In 2018, Real Sound described Katō as a "beautiful comedienne" and that her appeal lied in the contrast between her "cool" appearance and her comedic reactions and expression, which belied her dedication to Hiragana Keyakizaka46 as a "leading figure".

== Filmography ==
=== Television series ===
Year	Title	Role	Notes	Ref(s)
2021	Shiyūgakuryokō (Note: 死幽学旅行; transl. Deadly School Trip, wordplay of shūgakuryokō (修学旅行; lit. 'school trip'))	Yūki Suda	Vertical video format; lead role	
2024	Kore kara Haishin Hajimemasu (Note: これから配信はじめます; lit. 'Streaming Starts Now')	Kasumi	Lead role	
2024	"Hitting The Gym" Businessman: Kintaro Nakayama: Merry Christmuscle (Note: 筋トレサラリーマン中山筋太郎～メリークリスマッスル編～, Kintore Sararīman Nakayama Kintaro ~Merīkurisumassuru-hen)	Rie Akagi	2 special episodes; lead role	
2024−2025	Ayaka Is in Love with Hiroko! (Note: 彩香ちゃんは弘子先輩に恋してる, Ayaka-chan wa Hiroko-senpai ni Koishiteru)	Ayaka Usagida	Lead role	
2025	Boku no Azatoi Motokano (Note: 僕のあざとい元カノ; lit. 'My Wily Ex-girlfriend')	Mei Sonoda	Lead role	

=== Film ===
Year	Title	Role	Notes	Ref(s)
2026	Matched: True Love	Yura Hyuga		

=== Variety and talk shows ===
Year	Title	Role	Notes	Ref(s)
2021	Love It!	Regular host	Tuesday co-host, March 30 – May 25, 2021	

== Discography ==
=== Hiragana Keyakizaka46/Hinatazaka46 ===
As one half of the aforementioned "Strongest Symmetry" (最強シンメ, Saikyō Shinme), Katō was in the front line of most Hiragana Keyakizaka46 and Hinatazaka46 main song formations during her tenure. Her other notable contributions to the groups' discography include:

- "Happy Aura" (ハッピーオーラ) (2018, released on "Ambivalent"), first time as center (lead performer), namesake of Hinatazaka46's concept
- "Yasashisa ga Jama o Suru" ("Do Re Mi Sol La Si Do" B-side, 2019), as the "Respect Three" trio with Miho Watanabe and Hinano Kamimura
- "Kimi Shika Katan" (2021), title song center
- Solo songs
  - "Otoko Tomodachi Dakara" (男友達だから; lit. 'Because I'm Your Male Best Friend') (2018, released on Hashiridasu Shunkan)
  - "Nageki no Delete" (嘆きのDelete; lit. 'Delete the Sorrow') (2021, released on "Kimi Shika Katan")
  - "Docchi ga Saki ni Iu?" (どっちが先に言う？; lit. 'Who's Going to Say It First?') (2024, released on "Zettaiteki Dairokkan")

=== Sakamichi AKB ===
Year	Single	Song
2018	"Jabaja"	"Kokkyo no Nai Jidai" (国境のない時代)
2019	"Jiwaru Days"	"Hatsukoi Door" (初恋ドア)

== Other appearances ==
=== Theater ===
Year	Title	Role(s)	Venue(s)	Ref(s)
2018	Ayumi	Multiple	AiiA 2.5 Theater Tokyo	
2018	Magia Record	Mami Tomoe	Akasaka ACT Theater	

=== Radio ===
Year	Title	Role	Network	Notes	Ref(s)
2019–2023	Recommen! (レコメン!)	Regular co-host	Nippon Cultural Broadcasting		

== Bibliography ==
Title	Release date	Publisher	ISBN
#Aitai (#会いたい; lit. '#I Want to Meet', photobook)	June 20, 2023	Shogakukan	ISBN 978-4096824269
