= Silent Majority (song) =

- Regular edition cover. Each version A, B, C, and D has separate cover artwork.

Single by Keyakizaka46

from the album Masshiro na Mono wa Yogoshitaku naru
- A-side: "Silent Majority"
- B-side: "Te o Tsunaide Kaerōka"; "Yamanotesen" (Type-A); "Shibuyagawa" (Type-B); "Noriokureta Bus" (Type-C); "Kimi ga Inai" (Regular)
- Released: April 6, 2016 (Japan)
- Genre: J-pop
- Length: 4:25
- Label: Sony Records
- Songwriter(s): Yasushi Akimoto (lyrics); Bugbear (music)
- Producer(s): Yasushi Akimoto

Keyakizaka46 singles chronology
| "Silent Majority" (2016) | "Sekai ni wa Ai Shika Nai" (2016) |

Music video
- "Silent Majority" (Keyakizaka46 official ch.) "Silent Majority" (Sony Music Taiwan) "Silent Majority"(Keyakaizaka46 Vevo) on YouTube

"Silent Majority" (サイレントマジョリティー, Sairento Majoritī) is the debut single by the Japanese female idol group Keyakizaka46. It was released in Japan on 6 April 2016 on the label Sony Records.

The center position in the choreography for the title song is held by Yurina Hirate.

The single was number-one on the Oricon Weekly Singles Chart, with 261,580 copies sold, which is the No.1 debut song for female artist. It was also number-one on the Billboard Japan weekly chart and number-ten in yearly chart. It also has spent 149 weeks on the chart, which makes it sixth among the most weeks spent on the chart.

== Release history ==
In February 2016 it was revealed that Keyakizaka46 would release their first single on April 6, 2016. Its title was later revealed to be "Silent Majority". It was also revealed that the title song would be used in a TV commercial for a mobile application named Mechakari.

The single was released in four versions: Type-A, Type-B, Type-C, and a "Regular edition". All versions, except the regular edition, include a DVD with music videos. The cover photo was taken in the Shibuya River.

== Music video ==
The choreography for the title track was created by Takahiro Ueno. The music video for it was directed by Kazuma Ikeda and taken at the construction site near Shibuya Station.

== Track listings ==
All lyrics written by Yasushi Akimoto, all music composed by Bugbear.

=== Type-A ===
CD
| No. | Title | Length |
|---|---|---|
| 1. | "Silent Majority" (サイレントマジョリティー) | 4:25 |
| 2. | "Te o Tsunaide Kaerōka" (手を繋いで帰ろうか) | 5:16 |
| 3. | "Yamanotesen" (山手線) | 4:33 |
| 4. | "Silent Majority off vocal ver." | 4:25 |
| 5. | "Te o Tsunaide Kaerōka off vocal ver." | 5:16 |
| 6. | "Yamanotesen off vocal ver." | 4:31 |

DVD
| No. | Title | Length |
|---|---|---|
| 1. | "Silent Majority music video" | 4:26 |
| 2. | "Yamanotesen music video" | 4:58 |
| 3. | "Nijika Ishimori" | 5:25 |
| 4. | "Minami Koike" | 10:05 |
| 5. | "Yuuka Sugai" | 8:40 |
| 6. | "Nanako Nagasawa" | 4:59 |
| 7. | "Yurina Hirate" | 6:08 |
| 8. | "Nanami Yonetani" | 5:31 |
| 9. | "Rika Watanabe" | 5:17 |

=== Type-B ===
CD
| No. | Title | Length |
|---|---|---|
| 1. | "Silent Majority" (サイレントマジョリティー) | 4:25 |
| 2. | "Te o Tsunaide Kaerōka" (手を繋いで帰ろうか) | 5:16 |
| 3. | "Shibuyagawa" (渋谷川) | 4:52 |
| 4. | "Silent Majority off vocal ver." | 4:25 |
| 5. | "Te o Tsunaide Kaerōka off vocal ver." | 5:16 |
| 6. | "Shibuyagawa off vocal ver." | 4:50 |

DVD
| No. | Title | Length |
|---|---|---|
| 1. | "Silent Majority music video" | 4:26 |
| 2. | "Shibuyagawa music video" | 5:21 |
| 3. | "Yui Imaizumi" | 3:10 |
| 4. | "Rina Uemura" | 3:16 |
| 5. | "Rika Ozeki" | 7:02 |
| 6. | "Nana Oda" | 3:10 |
| 7. | "Shiori Sato" | 3:11 |
| 8. | "Manaka Shida" | 6:23 |
| 9. | "Akane Moriya" | 5:52 |

=== Type-C ===
CD
| No. | Title | Length |
|---|---|---|
| 1. | "Silent Majority" (サイレントマジョリティー) | 4:25 |
| 2. | "Te o Tsunaide Kaerōka" (手を繋いで帰ろうか) | 5:16 |
| 3. | "Noriokureta Bus" (乗り遅れたバス) | 4:29 |
| 4. | "Silent Majority off vocal ver." | 4:25 |
| 5. | "Te o Tsunaide Kaerōka off vocal ver." | 5:16 |
| 6. | "Noriokureta Bus off vocal ver." | 4:28 |

DVD
| No. | Title | Length |
|---|---|---|
| 1. | "Silent Majority music video" | 4:26 |
| 2. | "Te o Tsunaide Kaerōka music video" | 7:18 |
| 3. | "Yui Kobayashi" | 4:44 |
| 4. | "Fuyuka Saito" | 4:04 |
| 5. | "Miyu Suzumoto" | 6:41 |
| 6. | "Mizuho Habu" | 3:25 |
| 7. | "Aoi Harada" | 3:50 |
| 8. | "Risa Watanabe" | 8:42 |
| 9. | "Neru Nagahama" | 3:34 |

=== Regular Edition ===
CD
| No. | Title | Length |
|---|---|---|
| 1. | "Silent Majority" (サイレントマジョリティー) | 4:25 |
| 2. | "Te o Tsunaide Kaerōka" (手を繋いで帰ろうか) | 5:16 |
| 3. | "Kimi ga Inai" (キミガイナイ) | 4:43 |
| 4. | "Silent Majority off vocal ver." | 4:25 |
| 5. | "Te o Tsunaide Kaerōka off vocal ver." | 5:16 |
| 6. | "Kimi ga Inai off vocal ver." | 4:42 |

== Members ==
=== "Silent Majority" ===
Center: Yurina Hirate

- 1st row: Rika Watanabe, Miyu Suzumoto, Yurina Hirate, Yui Imaizumi, Yui Kobayashi
- 2nd row: Mizuho Habu, Rika Ozeki, Akane Moriya, Yūka Sugai, Manaka Shida, Risa Watanabe
- 3rd row: Fuyuka Saito, Nana Oda, Rina Uemura, Nanako Nagasawa, Minami Koike, Shiori Sato, Aoi Harada, Nanami Yonetani, Nijika Ishimori

=== "Te o Tsunaide Kaerōka" ===
- Nijika Ishimori, Yui Imaizumi, Rina Uemura, Rika Ozeki, Nana Oda, Minami Koike, Yui Kobayashi, Fuyuka Saito, Shiori Sato, Manaka Shida, Yuuka Sugai, Miyu Suzumoto, Nanako Nagasawa, Mizuho Habu, Aoi Harada, Yurina Hirate, Akane Moriya, Nanami Yonetani, Rika Watanabe, Risa Watanabe

=== "Yamanotesen" ===
- Yurina Hirate

=== "Shibuyagawa" ===
- Yui Imaizumi, Yui Kobayashi

=== "Noriokureta Bus" ===
Center: Neru Nagahama (Hiragana Keyakizaka46)

- Back dancer: Yui Imaizumi, Yui Kobayashi, Miyu Suzumoto, Yurina Hirate, Rika Watanabe（Keyakizaka46）

=== "Kimi ga Inai" ===
- Nijika Ishimori, Yui Imaizumi, Rina Uemura, Rika Ozeki, Nana Oda, Minami Koike, Yui Kobayashi, Fuyuka Saito, Shiori Sato, Manaka Shida, Yuuka Sugai, Miyu Suzumoto, Nanako Nagasawa, Mizuho Habu, Aoi Harada, Yurina Hirate, Akane Moriya, Nanami Yonetani, Rika Watanabe, Risa Watanabe

== Charts ==
=== Weekly charts ===
| Chart (2016) | Peak position |
|---|---|
| Japan (Oricon Weekly Singles Chart) | 1 |
| Japan (Billboard Japan Hot 100) | 1 |

=== Year-end charts ===
| Chart (2016) | Peak position |
|---|---|
| Japan (Oricon Yearly Singles Chart) | 14 |
| Billboard Japan Hot100 | 10 |
| Chart (2017) | Peak position |
| Billboard Japan Hot100 | 10 |
| Billboard Japan Download | 22 |
| Billboard Japan Streaming | 16 |

=== All-time charts ===
| Chart (2008–2022) | Position |
|---|---|
| Japan (Japan Hot 100) | 39 |
