= Neru Nagahama =

Japanese television personality, television presenter, and actress

- 長濱 ねる
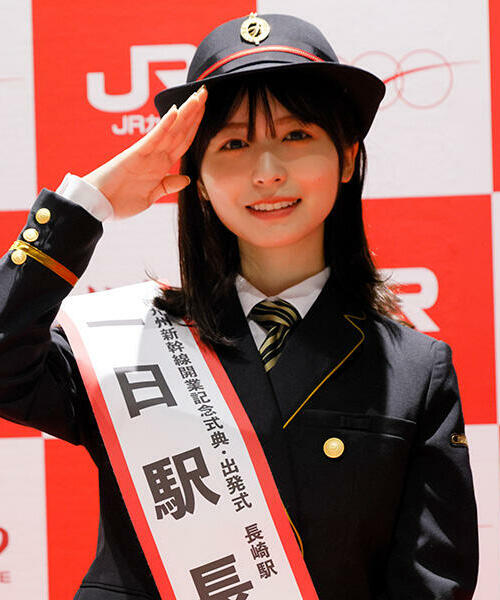
- Nagahama in September 2022
- Born: September 4, 1998 (age 28); Nagasaki, Japan
- Occupations: Television personality; television presenter; actress
- Years active: 2015–2019; 2020–present
- Agent: FLaMme
- Musical career
- Genre: J-pop
- Years active: 2015–2019
- Label: Sony Music Records
- Formerly of: Keyakizaka46 (2015–2019); Hiragana Keyakizaka46 (2015–2017)
- Website: Official website

Neru Nagahama (Japanese: 長濱 ねる, Hepburn: Nagahama Neru; born September 4, 1998) is a Japanese television personality, television presenter, and actress. She is a former member of the idol girl groups Keyakizaka46 (now Sakurazaka46) and Hiragana Keyakizaka46 (now Hinatazaka46).

Nagahama joined Keyakizaka46 in 2015 as the founding member of its subgroup Hiragana Keyakizaka46, and was briefly the only member of that subgroup. She left Hiragana Keyakizaka46 in 2017, Keyakizaka46 in 2019, and returned to the entertainment industry a year later as a television presenter and actress. She was also chairperson of the Tokyo Idol Festival from 2021 to 2026.

== Early life ==
Nagahama was born in Nagasaki, Nagasaki Prefecture. Between the ages of 3 and 7, she lived on Nakadōri Island, a remote part of Nagasaki in the Gotō Islands.

During high school, Nagahama appeared as a participant in the All-Japan High School Quiz Championship, a game show for high school students. She advanced to the prefectural-level championships.

== Career ==
Nagahama auditioned to be a part of Keyakizaka46; however, despite impressing the judges, she withdrew before the final round of auditions due to her parents' opposition. Later, her parents changed their minds after attending a Nogizaka46 concert in Fukuoka and allowed Nagahama to participate in the new group. With the support of the judges from the auditions, Nagahama officially joined Keyakizaka46 in November 2015 during the group's weekly variety show, Keyakitte, Kakenai? However, she was designated as the sole member of a subgroup named Hiragana Keyakizaka46 (けやき坂46, the exact same name but written in kana). Auditions for the subgroup began soon after.

Nagahama made her musical debut with Keyakizaka46's first single, "Silent Majority", though only appearing on a B-side song, "Noriokureta Bus" (乗り遅れたバス; lit. 'Missed Bus'). She made her first title song appearance in the second single, "Sekai ni wa Ai Shika Nai", and also sang a solo song, "Mata Atte Kudasai" (また会ってください; lit. 'Please Let Us Meet Again'). Although eleven new members joined Hiragana Keyakizaka46 in May 2016, Nagahama was the only one to appear in songs by both the main group and subgroup. In consideration of both groups' increasing activities and the addition of nine second generation members to Hiragana Keyakizaka46 in August 2017, Nagahama left Hiragana Keyakizaka46 in September 2017 and became part of the main group full-time.

In December 2017, Kodansha announced that they will be publishing a photo-book featuring Nagahama photographed on the Gotō Islands, her hometown. Nagahama was the first member of Keyakizaka46 to release such a book. The photo-book, titled Kokokara (ここから), sold 98,000 copies in its opening week, a record only topped by Mai Shiraishi's photo-book released earlier in the year. Her photo-book was also awarded by JR Kyushu for promoting tourism within Kyushu. Nagahama was also given the title "tourism ambassador" by Nagasaki.

Nagahama, Yui Imaizumi, and Yui Kobayashi performing a triple ceremonial first pitch for a Chiba Lotte Marines vs. Tohoku Rakuten Golden Eagles game in 2018.

Nagahama has appeared in all singles up until "Kuroi Hitsuji", and was also included in crossover groups such as Sakamichi AKB (with Nogizaka46 and AKB48) and IZ4648 (with Nogizaka46, AKB48, and Iz One). After the release of Kuroi Hitsuji in March 2019, Nagahama announced her resignation from the group, citing personal reasons. She officially left the group on 30 July 2019 with a farewell event at Makuhari Messe.

On July 7, 2020, Nagahama returned to the entertainment industry and joined the regular cast of the documentary/variety show 7 Rules, co-produced by Kansai TV and Fuji TV. She also launched her official website and Twitter account.

In July 2021, Nagahama was appointed the chairperson of the annual Tokyo Idol Festival, succeeding fellow former idol Rino Sashihara. She was succeeded by Nagi Inoue in 2026.

Nagahama is the Sustainable Development Goals PR ambassador for NHK, and also the host for the television network's sign language educational shorts, titled Shuwa Shower (手話シャワー; lit. 'Sign Language Shower') and started in February 2022. She would make her asadora debut in Maiagare! (2022) as Sakura Yamanaka, who is a Gotō Islands native like herself.

Nagahama was an ambassador for the 2025 Summer Deaflympics, held in Tokyo.

== Discography ==
=== Keyakizaka46 ===
Year	Single	Song	Notes
2016	"Silent Majority"	"Noriokureta Bus" (乗り遅れたバス)	
2016	"Sekai ni wa Ai Shika Nai"	"Sekai ni wa Ai Shika Nai" (世界には愛しかない)	
2016	"Sekai ni wa Ai Shika Nai"	"Kataru Nara Mirai o..." (語るなら未来を…)	
2016	"Sekai ni wa Ai Shika Nai"	"Mata Atte Kudasai" (また会ってください)	Solo song
2016	"Sekai ni wa Ai Shika Nai"	"Hiragana Keyaki" (ひらがなけやき)	As part of Hiragana Keyakizaka46
2016	"Futari Saison"	"Futari Saison" (二人セゾン)	
2016	"Futari Saison"	"Otona wa Shinjite Kurenai" (大人は信じてくれない)	
2016	"Futari Saison"	"Seifuku to Taiyō" (制服と太陽)	
2016	"Futari Saison"	"Dare Yori mo Takaku Tobe!" (誰よりも高く跳べ!)	As part of Hiragana Keyakizaka46
2016	"Futari Saison"	"Yūhi 1/3" (夕陽1/3)	With Yui Imaizumi, Yui Kobayashi, and Yurina Hirate
2017	"Fukyōwaon"	"Fukyōwaon" (不協和音)	
2017	"Fukyōwaon"	"W-KEYAKIZAKA no Uta" (W-KEYAKIZAKAの詩)	
2017	"Fukyōwaon"	"Hohoemi ga Kanashii" (微笑みが悲しい)	With Yurina Hirate
2017	"Fukyōwaon"	"Bokutachi wa Tsukiatteiru" (僕たちは付き合っている)	As part of Hiragana Keyakizaka46
2017	"Fukyōwaon"	"Eccentric" (エキセントリック)	
2017	"Kaze ni Fukarete mo"	"Kaze ni Fukarete mo" (風に吹かれても)	
2017	"Kaze ni Fukarete mo"	"Hiraishin" (避雷針)	
2018	"Glass wo Ware!"	"Glass wo Ware!" (ガラスを割れ!)	
2018	"Glass wo Ware!"	"Mou Mori e Kaerou ka?" (もう森へ帰ろうか?)	
2018	"Glass wo Ware!"	"Bathroom Travel" (バスルームトラベル)	With Rika Ozeki and Minami Koike
2018	"Ambivalent"	"Ambivalent" (アンビバレント)	
2018	"Ambivalent"	"Student Dance"	
2018	"Ambivalent"	"I'm out"	
2018	"Ambivalent"	"Ongaku Shitsu ni Kataomoi" (音楽室に片想い)	With Rika Ozeki and Minami Koike
2019	"Kuroi Hitsuji"	"Kuroi Hitsuji" (黒い羊)	
2019	"Kuroi Hitsuji"	"Nobody"	
2019	"Kuroi Hitsuji"	"Hitei Shita Mirai" (否定した未来)	Solo song

=== Other appearances ===
Year	Group	Single	Song	Notes
2017	Sakamichi AKB	"Shoot Sign"	"Dare no Koto wo Ichiban Aishiteru?" (誰のことを一番愛してる?)	
2018	Sakamichi AKB	"Jabaja"	"Kokkyo no Nai Jidai" (国境のない時代)	Center
2019	IZ4648	"Jiwaru Days"	"Hitsuzensei" (必然性)	

== Filmography ==
=== Drama series ===
Year	Title	Role	Notes	Ref(s)
2022	Love You as the World Ends - Special	Aki Ito		
2022–23	Soar High!	Sakura Yamanaka	Asadora	
2023	Outsider Cops	Maki Yonemitsu		
2023	Insider Cops	Maki Yonemitsu	Spin-off	
2023	Our Fake Marriage	Yae Sendo		
2024	The Decagon House Murders	Agatha		
2024	Colors of Sisterhood	Eri Machida		

=== Film ===
Year	Title	Role	Notes	Ref(s)
2026	Love≠Comedy	Misato		

=== Variety and talk shows ===
Year	Title	Role	Notes	Ref(s)
2020–present	7 Rules	Co-host		
2022–present	Shuwa Shower	Host		

== Bibliography ==
- Kokokara (ここから; lit. 'From Here') (ISBN 4063528650, Kodansha, 2017)
