= Fukyōwaon =

- Regular edition cover. Each version A, B, C, and D has separate cover artwork.

Single by Keyakizaka46

from the album Masshiro na Mono wa Yogoshitaku naru
- A-side: "Fukyōwaon"
- Released: 5 April 2017
- Genre: J-pop
- Label: Sony Music Records

Keyakizaka46 singles chronology
| "Futari Saison" (2016) | "Fukyōwaon" (2017) | "Kaze ni Fukarete mo" (2017) |

Music video
- "Fukyōwaon" "Fukyōwaon" (Vevo) on YouTube

"Fukyōwaon" (不協和音; Discord) is the 4th single by Japanese idol girl group Keyakizaka46. It was released on 5 April 2017. It reached number-one on the weekly Oricon Singles Chart with 632,667 copies sold. It was also number-one on the Billboard Japan Hot 100. "Fukyōwaon" is a Japanese word that means "dissonance."

The center (choreography center) position in the title track is held by Yurina Hirate.

== Track listing ==
Type A
| No. | Title | Length |
|---|---|---|
| 1. | "Fukyōwaon" (不協和音) | 4:09 |
| 2. | "W-KEYAKIZAKAの詩" | 5:08 |
| 3. | "微笑みが悲しい" | 4:55 |
| 4. | "Fukyōwaon -off vocal version-" (不協和音 -off vocal version-) | 4:09 |
| 5. | "W-KEYAKIZAKAの詩 -off vocal version-" | 5:08 |
| 6. | "微笑みが悲しい -off vocal version-" | 4:54 |

Type B
| No. | Title | Length |
|---|---|---|
| 1. | "Fukyōwaon" (不協和音) | 4:09 |
| 2. | "W-KEYAKIZAKAの詩" | 5:08 |
| 3. | "チューニング" | 4:32 |
| 4. | "Fukyōwaon -off vocal version-" (不協和音 -off vocal version-) | 4:09 |
| 5. | "W-KEYAKIZAKAの詩 -off vocal version-" | 5:08 |
| 6. | "チューニング -off vocal version-" | 4:30 |

Type C
| No. | Title | Length |
|---|---|---|
| 1. | "Fukyōwaon" (不協和音) | 4:09 |
| 2. | "W-KEYAKIZAKAの詩" | 5:08 |
| 3. | "割れたスマホ" | 4:06 |
| 4. | "Fukyōwaon -off vocal version-" (不協和音 -off vocal version-) | 4:09 |
| 5. | "W-KEYAKIZAKAの詩 -off vocal version-" | 5:08 |
| 6. | "割れたスマホ -off vocal version-" | 4:05 |

Type D
| No. | Title | Length |
|---|---|---|
| 1. | "Fukyōwaon" (不協和音) | 4:09 |
| 2. | "W-KEYAKIZAKAの詩" | 5:08 |
| 3. | "僕たちは付き合っている" | 4:38 |
| 4. | "Fukyōwaon -off vocal version-" (不協和音 -off vocal version-) | 4:09 |
| 5. | "W-KEYAKIZAKAの詩 -off vocal version-" | 5:08 |
| 6. | "僕たちは付き合っている -off vocal version-" | 4:37 |

Regular Edition
| No. | Title | Length |
|---|---|---|
| 1. | "Fukyōwaon" (不協和音) | 4:09 |
| 2. | "W-KEYAKIZAKAの詩" | 5:08 |
| 3. | "エキセントリック" | 4:33 |
| 4. | "Fukyōwaon -off vocal version-" (不協和音 -off vocal version-) | 4:09 |
| 5. | "W-KEYAKIZAKAの詩 -off vocal version-" | 5:08 |
| 6. | "エキセントリック -off vocal version-" | 4:31 |

== Chart performance ==
=== Weekly ===
Oricon

| Chart | Peak | Debut Sales | Sales Total |
|---|---|---|---|
| Weekly Singles Chart | 1 | 632,667 | |

Billboard Japan

| Chart | Peak |
|---|---|
| Japan Hot 100 | 1 |
| Radio Songs | 4 |
| Top Singles Sales | 1 |

=== Yearly ===
Billboard Japan

| Chart (2017) | Peak |
|---|---|
| Japan Hot 100 | 4 |
| Download Song | 55 |
| Steaming Song | 28 |
| Chart (2018) | Peak |
| Japan Hot 100 | 50 |
| Download Song | 92 |
| Steaming Song | 22 |
