= Rei Ōzono =

Japanese singer (born 2000)

- 大園 玲
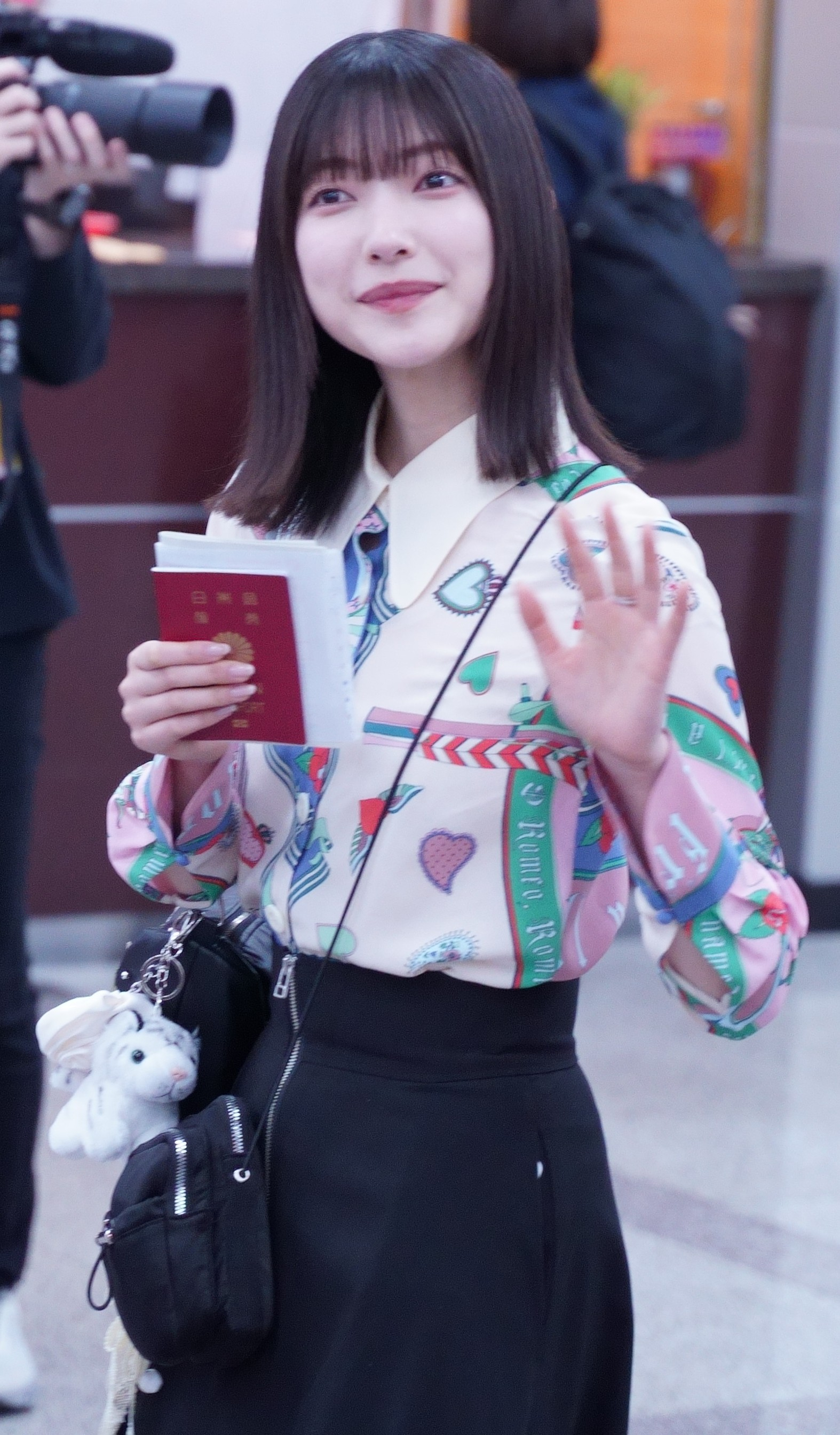
- Ōzono in Taiwan in 2025
- Born: April 18, 2000 (age 26); Kagoshima Prefecture, Japan
- Occupations: Singer; Actress
- Years active: 2020–present
- Agent(s): Seed & Flower LLC
- Height: 163 cm (5 ft 4 in)
- Musical career
- Genre: J-pop
- Instrument: Vocals
- Years active: 2020–present
- Label: Sony Music
- Member of: Sakurazaka46; Keyakizaka46; (Note: Keyakizaka46 went on hiatus after their live performance THE LAST LIVE, held on October 12 and 13, 2020, and Sakurazaka46 began their activities on October 14 of the same year.)

Rei Ōzono (大園 玲, Ōzono Rei; born April 18, 2000) is a Japanese singer and actress. She is a second generation member of the idol girl group Sakurazaka46.

== Biography ==
On August 19, 2018, Ōzono passed the audition for "Sakamichi Joint Audition for New Members" and began her activities as a Sakamichi trainee.

On October 30 – November 21, 2019, she participated in her first live performances during the "Sakamichi Group Joint Trainee Tour," which was held in Tokyo, Aichi, and Osaka.

On February 16, 2020, it was announced during a special program on the video streaming service SHOWROOM that she joined Keyakizaka46 (now Sakurazaka46) as a second generation member. She was selected as one of the performing members for the title track for the first time on Sakurazaka46's 1st single "Nobody's Fault", released on December 9, 2020.

On July 6, 2021, she made her first appearance a Wednesday regular (seasonal regular) for the "Love it! Family" on the TBS morning show Love it! and served in that role until September 28, 2021.

In February 2023, issue of Nikkei Entertainment! (published on January 4, 2023), she began writing a regular column titled "Mysterious Kōjōshin" as the successor to Yūka Sugai.

On February 15, 2023, she served as the center for the first time in her original position for the songs "Cool" from Sakurazaka46's 5th single "Sakurazuki", On April 18, 2023, Ōzono released her first photobook titled "Hanbun Hikari, Hanbun Kage" published by Kobunsha, which became the bestselling photobook in Japan that week with 28,000 sold and ranked No. 1 in the Photobook Category of the Oricon Weekly Book Ranking dated April 28, 2023.

On October 3, 2023, she served as the first MC of the radio show "Sakurazaka46 no「Sa」" on Nippon Cultural Broadcasting.

== Personal life ==
Ōzono was born in Kagoshima, Japan. She has older brother and younger sister.

In the second grade of elementary school, she began learning karate, influenced by her older brother. During junior high school, she started playing basketball.

She is studying psychology at university.

== Discography ==
=== Sakurazaka46 ===
==== Singles ====
Year	Single	Participating Song	Notes
2020	"Nobody's Fault"	"Nobody's Fault"	
2020	"Nobody's Fault"	"Saishū no Chikatetsu ni Notte" (最終の地下鉄に乗って)	
2020	"Nobody's Fault"	"Blue Moon Kiss" (ブルームーンキス)	
2021	"Ban"	"Ban"	
2021	"Ban"	"Kimi to Boku to Sentakumono" (君と僕と洗濯物)	
2021	"Ban"	"Sakurazaka no Uta" (櫻坂の詩)	
2021	"Nagaredama"	"Nagaredama" (流れ弾)	
2021	"Nagaredama"	"Sonia" (ソニア)	As part of BACKS Members
2021	"Nagaredama"	"Utsukushiki Nervous" (美しきNervous)	
2022	"Samidare yo"	"Samidare yo" (五月雨よ)	
2022	"Samidare yo"	"Boku no Dilemma" (僕のジレンマ)	
2022	"Samidare yo"	"I'm in"	As part of BACKS Members
2022	"Samidare yo"	"Koi ga zetsumetsu suru hi" (恋が絶滅する日)	
2023	"Sakurazuki"	"Sakurazuki" (桜月)	
2023	"Sakurazuki"	"Cool"	Performed as the center
2023	"Sakurazuki"	"Moshikashitara Shinjitsu" (もしかしたら真実)	
2023	"Sakurazuki"	"Tamashii no Liar" (魂のLiar)	
2023	"Sakurazuki"	"Sono Hi Made" (その日まで)	
2023	"Start Over!"	"Start Over!"	
2023	"Start Over!"	"Konbinato" (コンビナート)	As part of second generation members
2023	"Start Over!"	"Isshun no Uma" (一瞬の馬)	
2023	"Start Over!"	"Drone Senkai-chū" (ドローン旋回中)	
2023	"Shōninyokkyū"	"Shōninyokkyū" (承認欲求)	
2023	"Shōninyokkyū"	"Manhole no Futa no Ue" (マンホールの蓋の上)	
2023	"Shōninyokkyū"	"Sukimakaze yo" (隙間風よ)	
2024	"Ikutsu no Koro ni Modoritai no ka?"	"Ikutsu no Koro ni Modoritai no ka?" (何歳の頃に戻りたいのか?)	
2024	"Ikutsu no Koro ni Modoritai no ka?"	"Nakasete Hold me tight!" (泣かせて Hold me tight!)	
2024	"Jigōjitoku"	"Jigōjitoku" (自業自得)	
2024	"Jigōjitoku"	"Mō Ii-kyoku Hoshī no Kai?" (もう一曲 欲しいのかい？)	
2024	"I Want Tomorrow to Come"	"I Want Tomorrow to Come"	
2024	"I Want Tomorrow to Come"	"Arashi no Mae, Sekai no Owari" (嵐の前、世界の終わり)	
2024	"I Want Tomorrow to Come"	"TOKYO SNOW"	
2025	"Udagawa Generation"	"Udagawa Generation"	
2025	"Udagawa Generation"	"Monshirochō ga Tashika ton Deta" (紋白蝶が確か飛んでた)	As part of second generation members
2025	"Udagawa Generation"	"Yaru Shikanai jan" (やるしかないじゃん)	
2025	"Make or Break"	"Make or Break"	
2025	"Make or Break"	"Manatsu no Daitouryou" (真夏の大統領)	Unit with Moriya Rena, Mukai Itoha, Murai Yu and Murayama Miu
2025	"Make or Break"	"non-alcoholic" (ノンアルコール)	

===== Albums =====
Year	Album	Participating Song
2022	As You Know?	"Masatsukeisu" (摩擦係数)
2022	As You Know?	"Zutto Harudattara nā" (ずっと 春だったらなあ)
2025	Addiction	"Addiction"

=== Keyakizaka46 ===
==== Singles ====
Year	Single	Participating Song
2020	"Dare ga Sono Kane o Narasu no ka?"	"Dare ga Sono Kane o Narasu no ka?" (誰がその鐘を鳴らすのか?)

== Filmography ==
=== Television ===
- LOVE it! (July 6 – September 28, 2022, TBS)

=== Drama ===
- Actress (April 14 – June 2, 2023, Lemino and Hikari TV) – Role : Tomomi Tagawa

=== Variety shows ===
- Soko Magattara, Sakurazaka? (そこ曲がったら、櫻坂?)
- TOON GATE Vertical Manga Production Reality Show (July 26, 2022 – present, YouTube) (Note: Minami Koike, who was originally in charge of the narration, was replaced for episode 9 and 10.)

=== Radio ===
- Sakurazaka46 no「Sa」(October 3, 2023 – September 9, 2024, Nippon Cultural Broadcasting)

=== Stage ===
- Yuurei Demo Yokaken, Aitakato yo (October 4–6, 2024 at Sogetsu Hall)

=== Advertisements ===
- "Softbank Mobile LINEMO"「Stick Bread」and「Dodgeball」(July 14, 2023 – present)

== Bibliography ==
=== Magazine ===
- Nikkei Entertainment「Mysterious Kōjōshin」(4 January 2023, Nikkei Business Publications)

=== Photobooks ===
- Hanbun Hikari, Hanbun Kage (18 April 2023, Kobunsha) ISBN 9784334903091
