= Sakamichi Series =

Series of Japanese idol groups

- Origin: Japan
- Genre: J-pop
- Years active: 2011–present
- Label: Sony
- Members: Nogizaka46; Sakurazaka46; Yoshimotozaka46; Hinatazaka46

Sakamichi Series (Japanese: 坂道シリーズ; "Sloping Roads Series") is a Japanese idol group franchise that began with Nogizaka46, an "official" rival group of AKB48. It currently consists of four groups: Nogizaka46, Sakurazaka46, Hinatazaka46, and Yoshimotozaka46. Despite the name, the groups are not required to have exactly 46 members. Except for Yoshimotozaka46, all the groups were named after real streets in Minato, Tokyo and have all-female memberships.

== History ==
The first group, Nogizaka46, was formed on August 22, 2011 with 36 members and released their debut single "Guruguru Curtain" on February 22, 2012.

The second group, and Nogizaka46's first sister group, Keyakizaka46, was created on August 21, 2015 with 22 members. It was initially named Toriizaka46 before it was changed for unspecified reasons. They released their first single "Silent Majority" on April 6, 2016. A subgroup named Hiragana Keyakizaka46 was created shortly after with 12 members.

On February 21, 2018, Yoshimotozaka46 was announced as the third group in the franchise and 46 members passed the final audition on August 20. Unlike the other groups, it has both male and female members of various ages and most members are comedians affiliated with the Osaka-based talent agency Yoshimoto Kogyo, which also manages the idol group NMB48 and the Produce 101 Japan group JO1. They released their first single, "Nakasete Kure yo", on December 26, 2018.

On February 11, 2019, Hiragana Keyakizaka46 became independent and changed its name to Hinatazaka46, thus becoming the fourth group in the franchise. They released their debut single, "Kyun", on March 27, 2019. On July 16, 2020, it was announced that Keyakizaka46 would also be rebranded into Sakurazaka46, which came into effect on October 14.

In the summer of 2018, the Sakamichi Joint Audition was held for the all-female groups and 36 of those who auditioned were accepted. Of the 36, 21 were immediately accepted to the groups:

- Nogizaka46 (11): Sakura Endō, Haruka Kaki, Sayaka Kakehashi, Saya Kanagawa, Yuri Kitagawa, Yuna Shibata, Rei Seimiya, Mayu Tamura, Ayame Tsutsui, Seira Hayakawa, Mio Yakubo
- Keyakizaka46 (9): Rina Inoue, Yumiko Seki, Yui Takemoto, Hono Tamura, Karin Fujiyoshi, Rina Matsuda, Riko Matsudaira, Hikaru Morita, Ten Yamasaki
- Hiragana Keyakizaka46 (1): Hinano Kamimura

The remaining 15 were grouped as the trainee group Sakamichi Kenshūsei (坂道研修生) in 2019. One trainee, Manami Matsuoka, dropped out, and the 14 remaining ones were assigned to the three groups on February 16, 2020:

- Nogizaka46 (5): Haruka Kuromi, Rika Satō, Runa Hayashi, Miyu Matsuo, Nao Yumiki
- Sakurazaka46 (6): Hikari Endō, Rei Ōzono, Akiho Ōnuma, Marino Kōsaka, Kira Masumoto, Rena Moriya
- Hinatazaka46 (3): Mikuni Takahashi, Marie Morimoto, Haruyo Yamaguchi

In 2021, members of Nogizaka46, Sakurazaka46, and Hinatazaka46 co-starred in a television series for the first time in the mystery drama Borderless, based on the novel of the same title by Tetsuya Honda. It was followed by its 2023 sequel, Actress.

In 2026, a new group named Aobazaka46 was announced. It would be active for one year, after which its members would be transferred to Nogizaka46, Sakurazaka46, and Hinatazaka46 as the newest generations. This has been compared to the 2018 Joint Audition, with the one-year activity period as the time when each member's development could indicate which group would be the most suitable for her.

== Current groups ==
| Group name | Group color | Years active | Teams (if split) | Location |
|---|---|---|---|---|
| Nogizaka46 (乃木坂46) | Purple | 2011–present | 1st Gen, 2nd Gen, 3rd Gen, 4th Gen, 5th Gen, 6th Gen | Tokyo, Japan |
| Sakurazaka46 (櫻坂46) | White-Pink | 2015–2020 (as Keyakizaka46); 2020–present (as Sakurazaka46) | 1st Gen, 2nd Gen, 3rd Gen, 4th Gen | Tokyo, Japan |
| Yoshimotozaka46 (吉本坂46) | Orange | 2018–present (currently on indefinite hiatus) | 1st Gen, 2nd Gen | Osaka, Japan |
| Hinatazaka46 (日向坂46) | Sky Blue | 2015–2019 (as Hiragana Keyakizaka46); 2019–present (as Hinatazaka46) | 1st Gen, 2nd Gen, 3rd Gen, 4th Gen, 5th Gen | Tokyo, Japan |

== Management ==
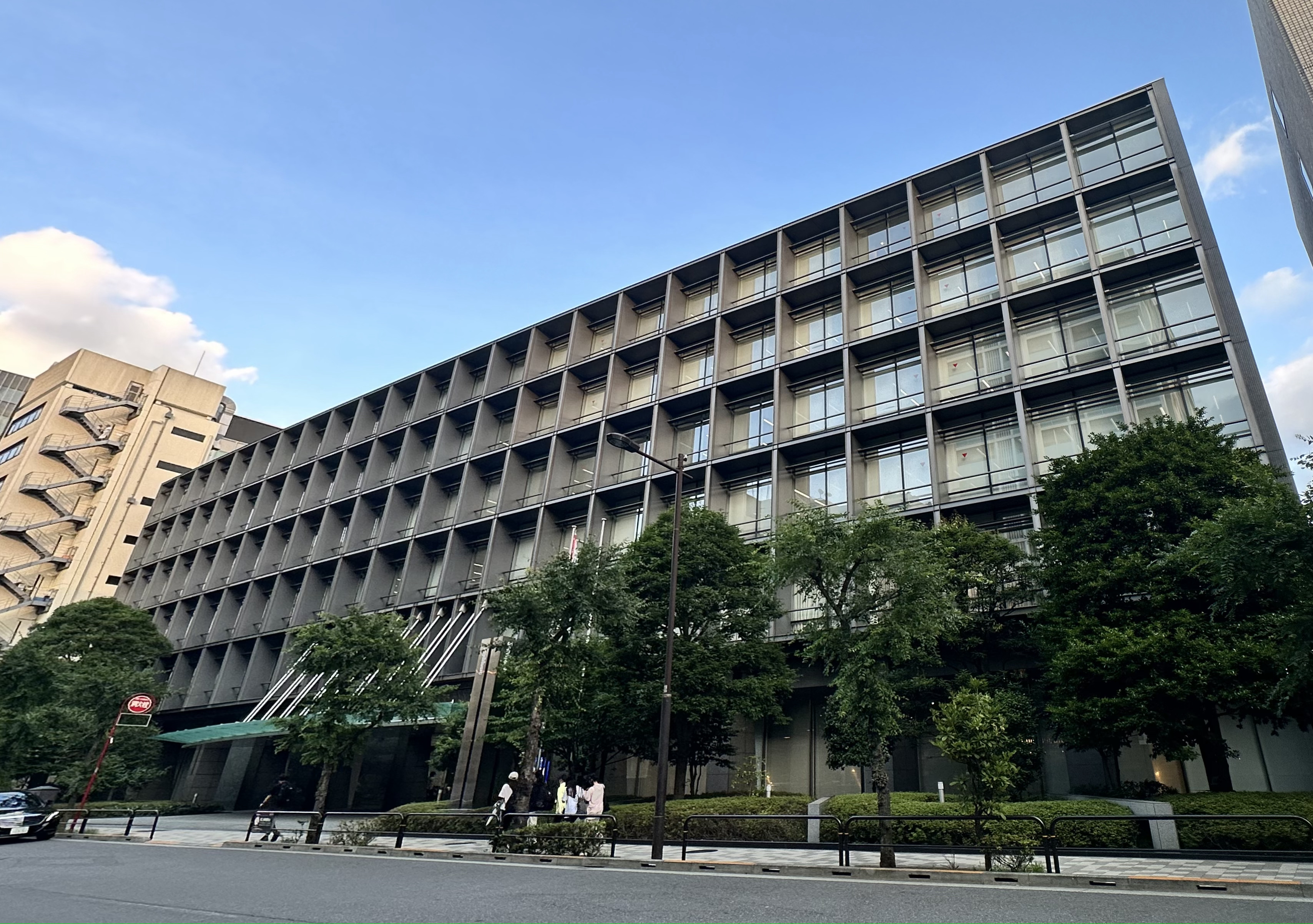
The SME Rokubancho Building in Chiyoda, Tokyo houses both the offices of Nogizaka46, LLC and Seed & Flower, LLC.

Several corporate entities manage the Sakamichi Series groups.

=== Nogizaka46, LLC ===
Nogizaka46, LLC is simply represented by the Nogizaka46 logo.

Nogizaka46, LLC (乃木坂46合同会社) is the agency that manages Nogizaka46. It was established in 2012 as a joint venture between Sony Music Labels and North River, Inc, with each party holding 50% ownership. North River was registered as a company primarily providing transportation services for the entertainment industry and was co-owned by Yasushi Akimoto, Kyoraku Sangyo, AKS (now Vernalossom), and Shinsuke Akimoto, with Kenji Kitagawa as representative director. (Note: "North River" is the direct translation of Kitagawa (北川).) In 2020, North River was wholly acquired by and became a subsidiary of entertainment company KeyHolder, Inc., making Nogizaka46, LLC an equity-method affiliate of KeyHolder. Yasushi Akimoto subsequently became a special advisor and second-largest shareholder of KeyHolder, holding 7.59% of its shares as of 2025, while Kitagawa became an executive vice president at the company and director of several of its subsidiaries, including North River.

Nogizaka46, LLC also manages several former Nogizaka46 members.

==== Current individual talents ====
- Karin Itō
- Marika Itō
- Minami Umezawa
- Shiori Kubo
- Asuka Saitō
- Reika Sakurai
- Mai Shiraishi
- Kazumi Takayama
- Kana Nakada
- Himeka Nakamoto
- Nanase Nishino
- Hina Higuchi
- Mizuki Yamashita
- Yūki Yoda

=== Seed & Flower ===
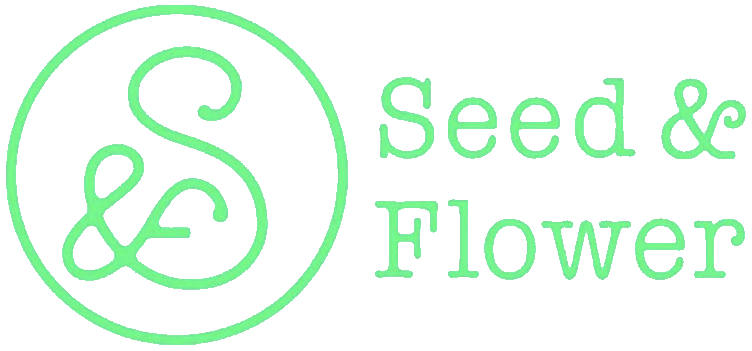
Seed & Flower, LLC logo.

Seed & Flower, LLC (Seed & Flower合同会社) is the company that manages Sakurazaka46 and Hinatazaka46. It was established in February 2016 as Dog House, LLC by Sony Music Labels and Y&N Brothers, co-owned by Yasushi Akimoto. It was renamed Seed & Flower in August 2016 and subsequently became the management company of Keyakizaka46, rebranded to Sakurazaka46 in 2020, and Hiragana Keyakizaka46, rebranded to Hinatazaka46 in 2019. The company also managed the now-disbanded rock band Thinking Dogs, for whom Yasushi Akimoto wrote several songs.

Seed & Flower also manages several former Keyakizaka46, Sakurazaka46, and Hinatazaka46 members.

==== Current individual talents ====
- Shiho Katō
- Hina Kawata
- Yui Kobayashi
- Kumi Sasaki
- Akari Nibu
- Konoka Matsuda

==== Former individual talents ====
- Neru Nagahama
- Risa Watanabe

=== Yoshimoto Kogyo ===
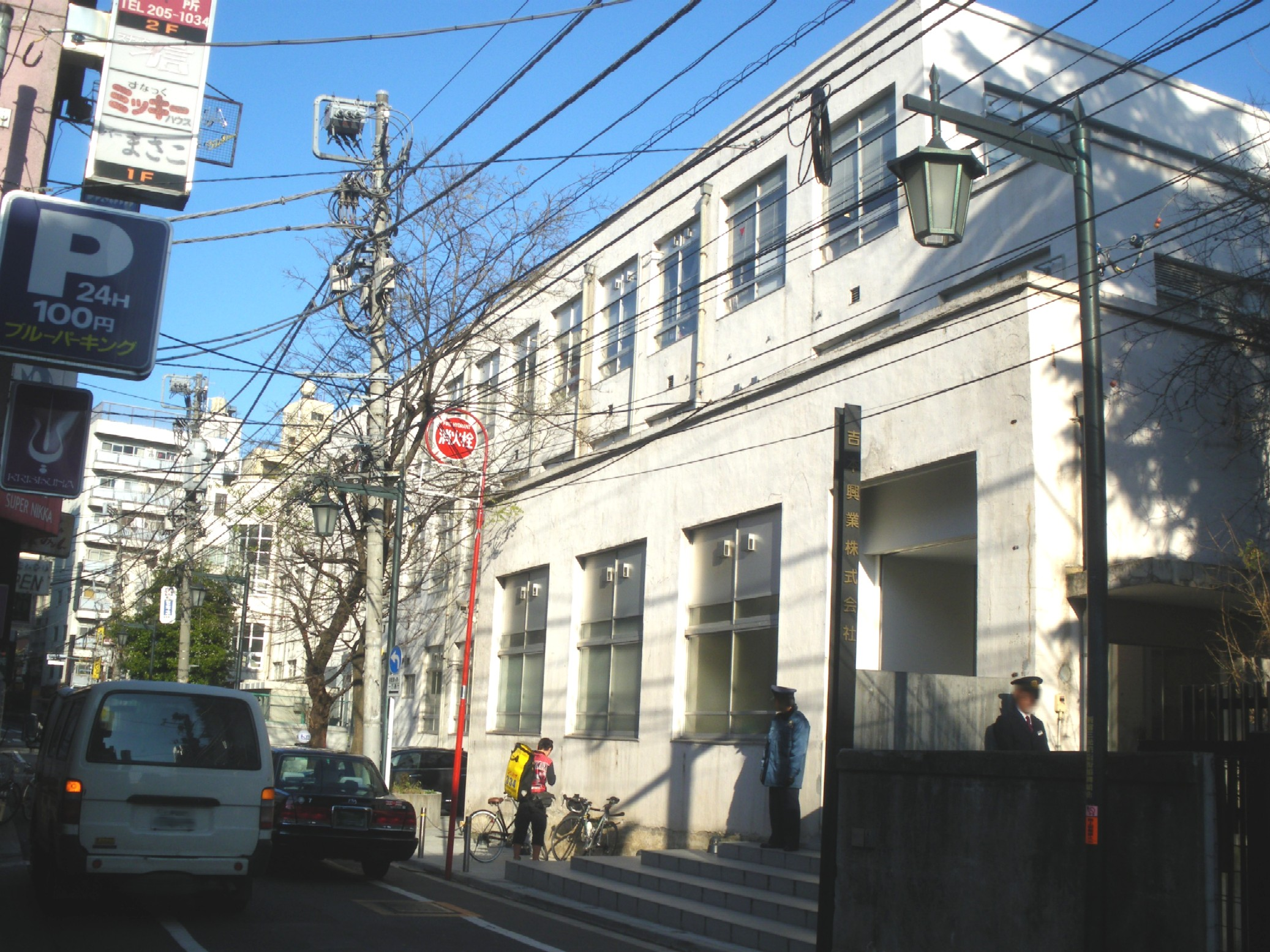
Yoshimoto Kogyo's Tokyo office in Shinjuku.

Yoshimoto Kogyo is the company that manages Yoshimotozaka46. The group was formed from talents already affiliated with Yoshimoto Kogyo, including comedians, actors, and other entertainers. Sony Music acts as the label and Yasushi Akimoto as producer.

== Parodies ==
- WACK debuted a one-off shuffle unit named Dōgenzaka43 (道玄坂43) consisting of every idol under the company at the time, they released the single, "Kyōniku Jakushoku ~Tsuyoi Yatsura wo Kucchimae~" (強肉弱食時代 〜強い奴らを食っちまえ〜), on June 16, 2021.
