= Borderless (TV series) =

2021 Japanese streaming series

- Promotional poster
- Katakana: ボーダレス
- Revised Hepburn: Bōdaresu
- Based on: Borderless by Tetsuya Honda
- Starring: Hikaru Morita; Kyōko Saitō; Risa Watanabe; Hiyori Hamagishi; Yui Kobayashi; Seira Hayakawa; Sakura Endō
- Ending theme: "Hajimari no Period" by Thinking Dogs
- Country of origin: Japan
- Original language: Japanese
- No. of episodes: 10

Original release
- Network: Hikari TV
- Release: March 7, 2021

Related
- Actress

Borderless (Japanese: ボーダレス) is a 2021 Japanese series. It is based on a 2018 novel of the same title by Tetsuya Honda and is the first drama collaboration of idol groups Nogizaka46, Sakurazaka46 (formerly Keyakizaka46), and Hinatazaka46 (formerly Hiragana Keyakizaka46). The novel was originally written for an adaptation starring members of Keyakizaka46 and Hiragana Keyakizaka46.

Cinemas Plus praised its production values and the members' performances, and highly recommended the drama even for non-fans of the Sakamichi Series. The three groups would collaborate again on its 2023 sequel, Actress.

== Cast ==
- Hikaru Morita (Sakurazaka46) as Nao Mori
- Kyōko Saitō (Hinatazaka46) as Kiri Katayama
- Risa Watanabe (Sakurazaka46) as Haru Yatsuji
- Hiyori Hamagishi (Hinatazaka46) as Kei Yatsuji
- Yui Kobayashi (Sakurazaka46) as Kotone Ichihara
- Seira Hayakawa (Nogizaka46) as Kanon Ichihara
- Sakura Endō (Nogizaka46) as Yuki Matsumiya
