= Actress (TV series) =

2023 Japanese television series

- Promotional poster
- Katakana: アクトレス
- Revised Hepburn: Akutoresu
- Based on: Actress by Tetsuya Honda
- Starring: Hikaru Morita; Kyōko Saitō; Rei Ōzono; Yui Kobayashi; Seira Hayakawa; Riria Itō; Runa Hayashi
- Ending theme: "Shinkaigyo" by Thinking Dogs
- Country of origin: Japan
- Original language: Japanese
- No. of episodes: 10

Original release
- Network: Lemino
- Release: April 14, 2023

Related
- Borderless

Actress (Japanese: アクトレス) is a 2023 Japanese series. It is the sequel to Borderless, and is also based on a novel by Tetsuya Honda and a collaboration between idol groups Nogizaka46, Sakurazaka46, and Hinatazaka46.

== Cast ==
- Hikaru Morita (Sakurazaka46) as Nao Mori
- Kyōko Saitō (Hinatazaka46) as Kiri Katayama
- Rei Ōzono (Sakurazaka46) as Tomomi Tagawa
- Yui Kobayashi (Sakurazaka46) as Kotone Nakajima (née Ichihara)
- Seira Hayakawa (Nogizaka46) as Kanon Ichihara
- Riria Itō (Nogizaka46) as Kanna Mase
- Runa Hayashi (Nogizaka46) as Miki Amano
