= Aobazaka46 =

Japanese girl group

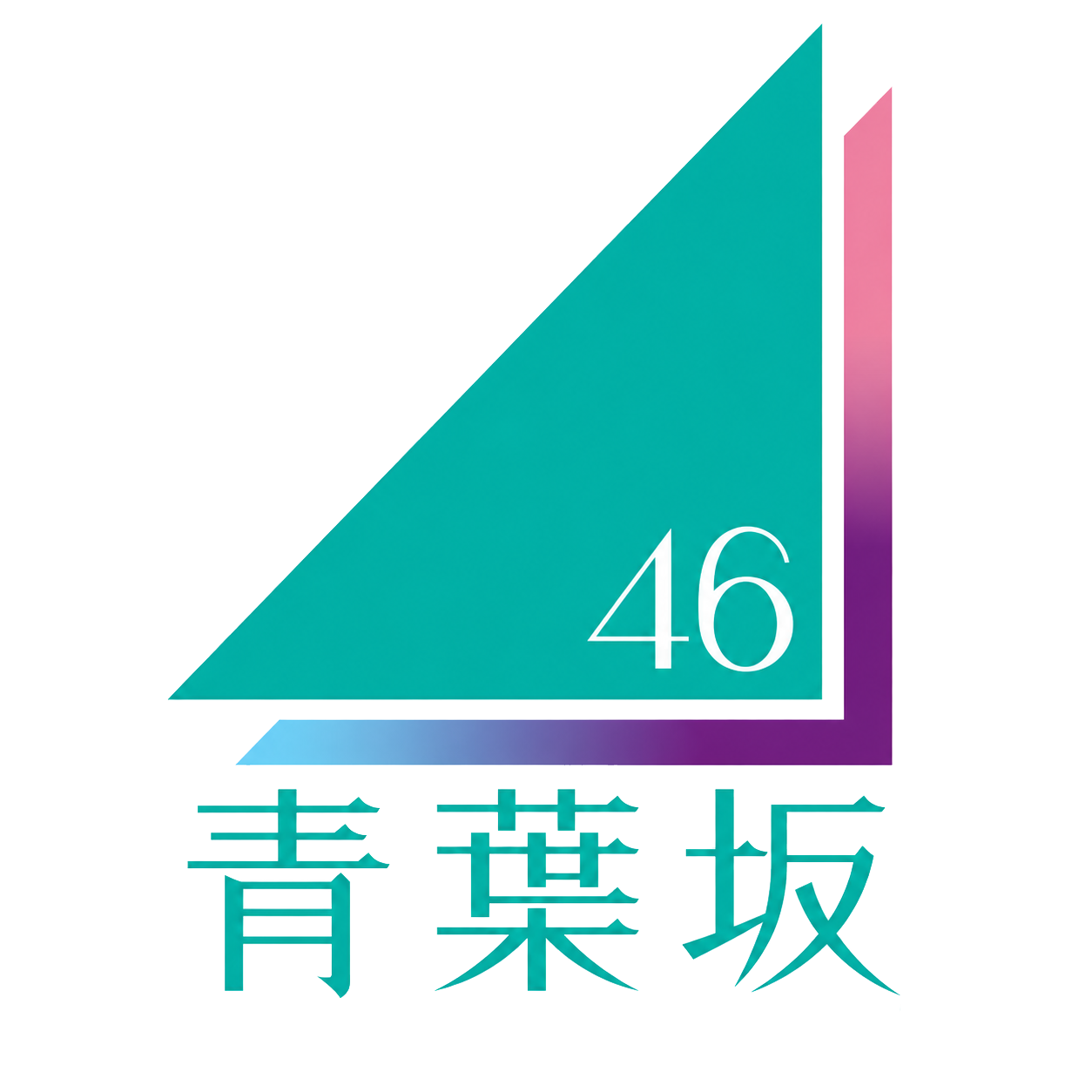
- Aobazaka46 logo

Background information
- Genre: J-pop
- Years active: 2027 (estimated)
- Label: Sony Music Entertainment Japan
- Website: Official website

Aobazaka46 (Japanese: 青葉坂46, Hepburn: Aobazaka Fōtīshikkusu) is a Japanese idol girl group produced by Yasushi Akimoto, created as a one-year limited group to be active through 2027. After a year of activities, members of the group will be assigned to one of the Sakamichi Series groups: Nogizaka46 (seventh generation), Sakurazaka46 (fifth generation), or Hinatazaka46 (sixth generation).

== History ==
A billboard displaying the Aobazaka46 logo near the Tokyo Shibuya Crossing, taken 20 August 2026

The name Aobazaka46 was first revealed in a teaser commercial aired during the Nogizaka Kōjichū variety show on 16 August 2026.

Announcement
- Announcement of Aobazaka46 through a "hijack" of Shibuya Crossing, 18 August 2026 on YouTube

The formation of Aobazaka46 and member recruitment was announced on 18 August 9 PM JST, through video announcements synchronized between 13 digital billboards around the Shibuya Crossing in Tokyo, featuring prominent members of Nogizaka46 (Sakura Endō, Haruka Kaki, Teresa Ikeda, and Nagi Inoue), Sakurazaka46 (Hikaru Morita, Ten Yamasaki, Airi Taniguchi, and Shizuki Yamashita), and Hinatazaka46 (Nao Kosaka, Hinano Kamimura, Yōko Shōgenji, and Manami Ōno). An announcement of new member recruitment was also made on the official websites of the three groups on the same day, with registration accepted until 8 October, followed by several rounds of audition from October to December.

Aobazaka46 would be active for one year, after which its members would be assigned to one of the Sakamichi Series groups as the newest generations: Nogizaka46 seventh generation, Sakurazaka46 fifth generation, or Hinatazaka46 sixth generation. This has been compared to the 2018 Sakamichi Joint New Member Recruitment Audition (坂道合同新規メンバー募集オーディション, Sakamichi Gōdō Shinki Menbā Boshū Ōdishon), which was also held to recruit new members for the three groups; Nikkan Sports reported that the name aoba (青葉), meaning "green leaves", was selected to reflect the members' youth and "imperfection". Writing for Real Sound, music journalist Tatsuya Kawasaki predicted that unlike the Joint Audition, this new system would allow the members to further develop their aptitude and individuality within the one-year working period, which in turn would better indicate their suitability for each group, and that they would later introduce a unique Aobazaka46 identity to their future assigned groups.

Music video
- "Audition" on YouTube

A theme song for the auditions titled "Audition" was released on 26 September. It was performed by the "Sakamichi Selection" (坂道選抜, Sakamichi Senbatsu), consisting of all members who appeared in the original announcement and Nogizaka46's Miku Ichinose, Sakurazaka46's Mio Matono, and Hinatazaka46's Kaho Fujishima for a total of 15 performers, with Nagi Inoue as center (lead performer). Directed by Ryōhei Shingū and choreographed by Seishiro, the music video is themed around spotlights and depicts the desire "to be recognized for who you are by the world" and the "light and shadow" or the "anguish and joy" of being an idol, with lyrics about looking for a place to belong. The song reached #17 on the Oricon Weekly Streaming chart.

More details about Aobazaka46's one-year activities were released on 1 October, which included dance and vocal training, a debut event, an original television program, and original songs and music videos. The disbandment concert and group assignment announcement have been scheduled for 19 December 2027 at the Nippon Budokan.
