= Kyōko Saitō =

Japanese actress, television presenter, and singer

- 齊藤 京子
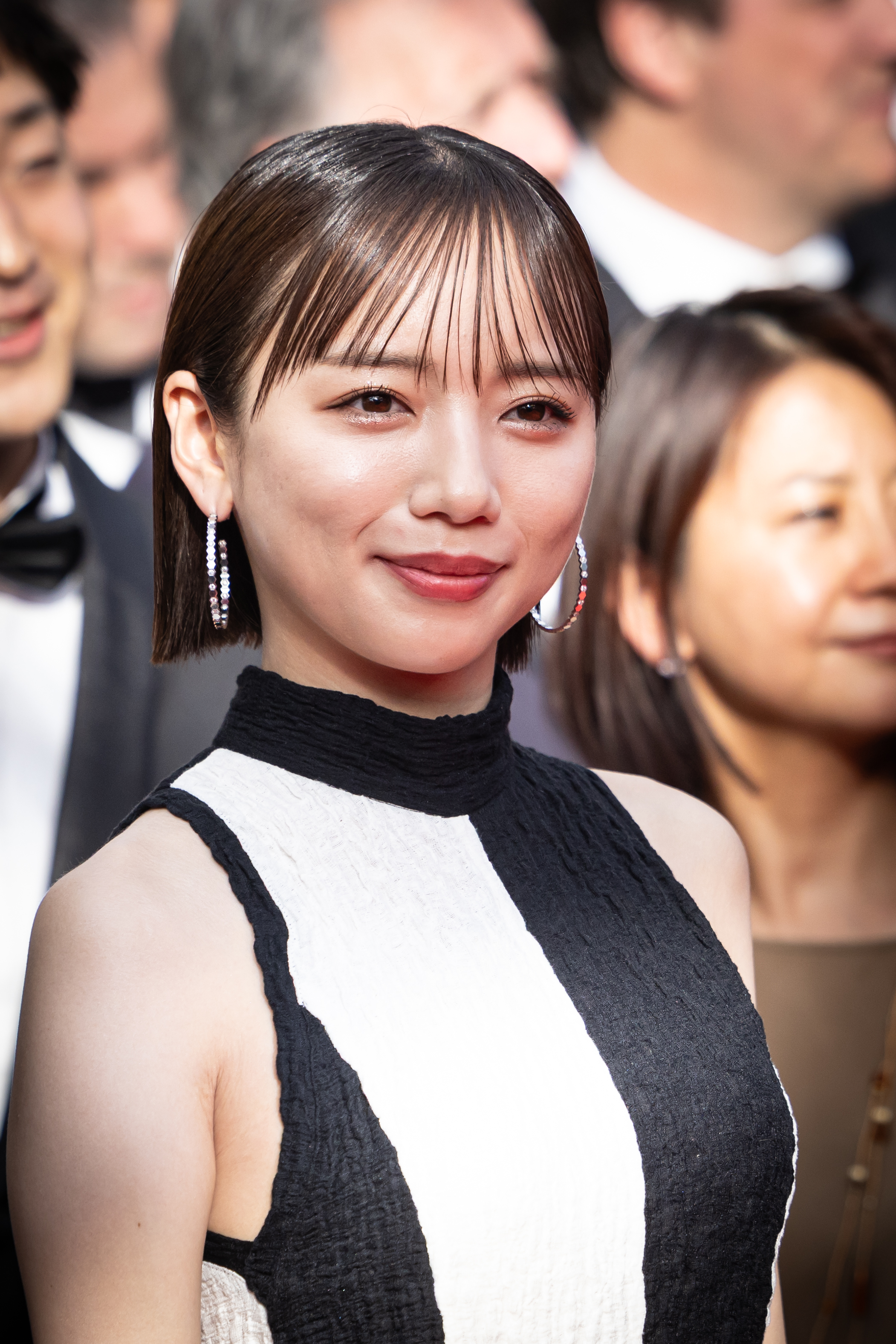
- Saitō at the 2025 Cannes Film Festival
- Born: September 5, 1997 (age 29); Tokyo, Japan
- Occupations: Actress; television presenter; singer
- Years active: 2016–present
- Agent: Toho
- Musical career
- Genre: J-pop
- Years active: 2016−2024; 2026−present
- Label: Sony
- Formerly of: Hinatazaka46
- Modeling information
- Height: 155.5 cm (5 ft 1 in)
- Hair color: Black
- Eye color: Black
- Website: Official website

Kyōko Saitō (Japanese: 齊藤京子, Hepburn: Saitō Kyōko; born September 5, 1997) is a Japanese actress, television presenter, and singer, represented by Toho. She co-hosts the talk show Kyoccorohee on TV Asahi and made her international acting debut as the star of Love on Trial (2025), screened at the 2025 Cannes Film Festival.

Saitō began her career as a founding member of the girl group Hinatazaka46 (formerly Hiragana Keyakizaka46) from 2016 to 2024. She made her acting debut in the group's drama Re:Mind (2017), and has since starred in Muddy Dining Table (2023), Sudden Marriage (2025), and Suspicious Partner (2025); she has also provided the Japanese dub voice for the character April O'Neil since Teenage Mutant Ninja Turtles: Mutant Mayhem (2023). As a singer, she was the lead performer for Hinatazaka46's 2022 single "Tsuki to Hoshi ga Odoru Midnight" and has held solo concerts in 2022 and 2023 in collaboration with MTV Japan. She was also a regular model for the fashion magazine Ar from 2019 to 2024. Her fans are known as the Kyonkois (きょんこいず, Kyonkoizu).

In October 2026, Saitō announced her debut as a solo singer, with her first song released digitally that month and a debut solo concert scheduled for February 2027.

== Career ==
=== 2016–2018: Early career with Hiragana Keyakizaka46 ===
Saitō's training bib in Hiragana Keyakizaka46.

Saitō had aspired to become a singer since middle school. She attempted and failed multiple singing auditions until she tried out for Hiragana Keyakizaka46, the new subgroup of girl group Keyakizaka46, after she learned that Yui Imaizumi, whom she had met at one of the previous auditions, had joined Keyakizaka46. Her musical career began in May 2016 when she passed the auditions and joined the group as a member of the founding "first generation". Her first concert took place on October 28 of the same year at Akasaka Blitz, where she performed Keyakizaka46 songs "Silent Majority" and "Sekai ni wa Ai Shika Nai", as well as Hiragana Keyakizaka46's own "Hiragana Keyaki".

Saitō was the center (lead performer) for the song "Soredemo Aruiteru", released on the 2017 Keyakizaka46 single "Kaze ni Fukarete mo" and the opening song for her and Hiragana Keyakizaka46's drama series debut that year, Re:Mind. Her first solo song, "Igokochiwaruku Otona ni natta" (居心地悪く大人になった; lit. 'Uncomfortably Became an Adult'), was released on Hiragana Keyakizaka46's 2020 debut album Hashiridasu Shunkan. She and Shiho Katō were particularly recognized for their vocal abilities and were often assigned to the front rows of song formations on either side of the center, earning them the nickname "Strongest Symmetry" (最強シンメ, Saikyō Shinme) which remained popular throughout their tenure.

Saitō is a ramen enthusiast, inspired by the manga and anime series Ms. Koizumi Loves Ramen Noodles, and her catchphrase is "I love ramen, I'm Kyōko Saitō" (ラーメン大好き、齊藤京子です, ramen daisuki, Saitō Kyōko desu). She was featured in a 2018 television special titled after her catchphrase, in which several members take her to their recommended ramen restaurants.

=== 2019–2021: Hinatazaka46 and Kyoccorohee ===
Hiragana Keyakizaka46 was spun off from Keyakizaka46 and rebranded into Hinatazaka46 in February 2019. Saitō was one of five members representing Hinatazaka46 in "Hatsukoi Door", a collaboration song between the AKB48 Group and Sakamichi Series franchises released on the 2019 AKB48 single "Jiwaru Days". In variety shows, she was known for her proficiency in the language game babigo (バビ語), with fellow member Kumi Sasaki serving as "interpreter". She also maintained her ramen lover persona, becoming an ambassador for the 2019 Ramen Girls Expo in Shizuoka and appointed "Jjigae Miso Angel" by the ramen chain Hidakaya for her fondness of their Jjigae Miso ramen in 2021.

Saitō's acting career continued with her role as the high school student Wakame Isono (double cast with then-Nogizaka46 member Manatsu Akimoto) in the 2019 stage adaptation of the long-running manga Sazae-san and a supporting role in the Hinatazaka46 drama Dasada (2020). She co-starred in the 2021 television series Borderless, which features selected members of Nogizaka46, Sakurazaka46, and Hinatazaka46 co-starring in a television drama for the first time, and its 2023 sequel Actress.

From 2019 to 2024, Saitō was a regular model for the fashion magazine Ar. Her solo photobook, titled Totteoki no Koibito (とっておきの恋人; Special Lover), was released by publisher Shufu No Seikatsusha (publisher of Ar) on January 19, 2021, with the concept of "dating at various locations in Tokyo". The initial print run was 115,000 copies, and a total of 40,000 additional copies were reprinted within its release week. The book placed first on the Oricon Weekly Photobook chart with an estimated 84,000 copies sold and was third place with 135,000 copies sold on that year's Annual Photobook chart, which saw the top three ranks dominated by Hinatazaka46 with Nao Kosaka's photobook on first and the group's Hinasatsu Vol. 01 on second.

In June 2020, Saitō announced that her official fandom name would be Kyonkois (きょんこいず, Kyonkoizu), a combination between her nickname Kyonko and "love" (恋, koi).

The late-night dance talk show Kyoccorohee (キョコロヒー), co-hosted by Saitō and comedienne Hiccorohee, started airing on TV Asahi on April 1, 2021. Since then, live events based on the show have been held in 2022 at the EX Theater Roppongi and in 2023 at the Tokyo International Forum, Hall A. According to Saitō, the show's appeal lies in having long-winded conversations between two women who are "not on the same wavelength".

=== 2022–2024: Becoming Hinatazaka46 center, expansion of solo works ===
In May 2022, Saitō performed a solo cover of the Hinatazaka46 seventh single "Boku Nanka", which would be released the next month, on the YouTube channel The First Take. The song was rearranged with piano and strings to showcase her voice, and she commented that she projected her own insecurities into her performance. She then became the center for the group's eighth single "Tsuki to Hoshi ga Odoru Midnight", announced and performed live for the first time on September 10, 2022, during the "Happy Smile Tour 2022" national tour performance at Aichi Sky Expo. She held two solo concerts with MTV Japan: the broadcast-only 2022 "MTV Live Sessions: Kyoko Saito from Hinatazaka46" and 2023 "MTV Unplugged Presents: Kyoko Saito from Hinatazaka46" at Pia Arena MM. She also performed in collaborations with musicians who won the Daisy Bell Award, an award for music created using voice synthesizer software, in the 2021 and 2023 MTV Video Music Awards Japan.

In 2023, Saitō appeared in her first solo lead role in the television drama adaptation of the manga Muddy Dining Table (泥濘の食卓, Nukarumi no Shokutaku) and made her voice acting debut as the Japanese dub voice of April O'Neil in Teenage Mutant Ninja Turtles: Mutant Mayhem. The same year, the cup noodle brand CupStar, in whose commercials Hinatazaka46 had previously appeared, released a Hidakaya Jjigae Miso Ramen limited edition product, with Saitō's likeness featured on the lid.

Aside from Hinatazaka46, Saitō and Hiccorohee released their debut single under the name Kyoccorohee, "After You!", digitally on January 1, 2024, and as physical media on February 14. The main song, written by Hinatazaka46 producer and lyricist Yasushi Akimoto, was first revealed live on Music Station Superlive 2023 on December 22, 2023. Saitō wrote the lyrics for her solo song on the single. The music video is published on Hinatazaka46's YouTube channel and is the first song on the channel sang by a non-member.

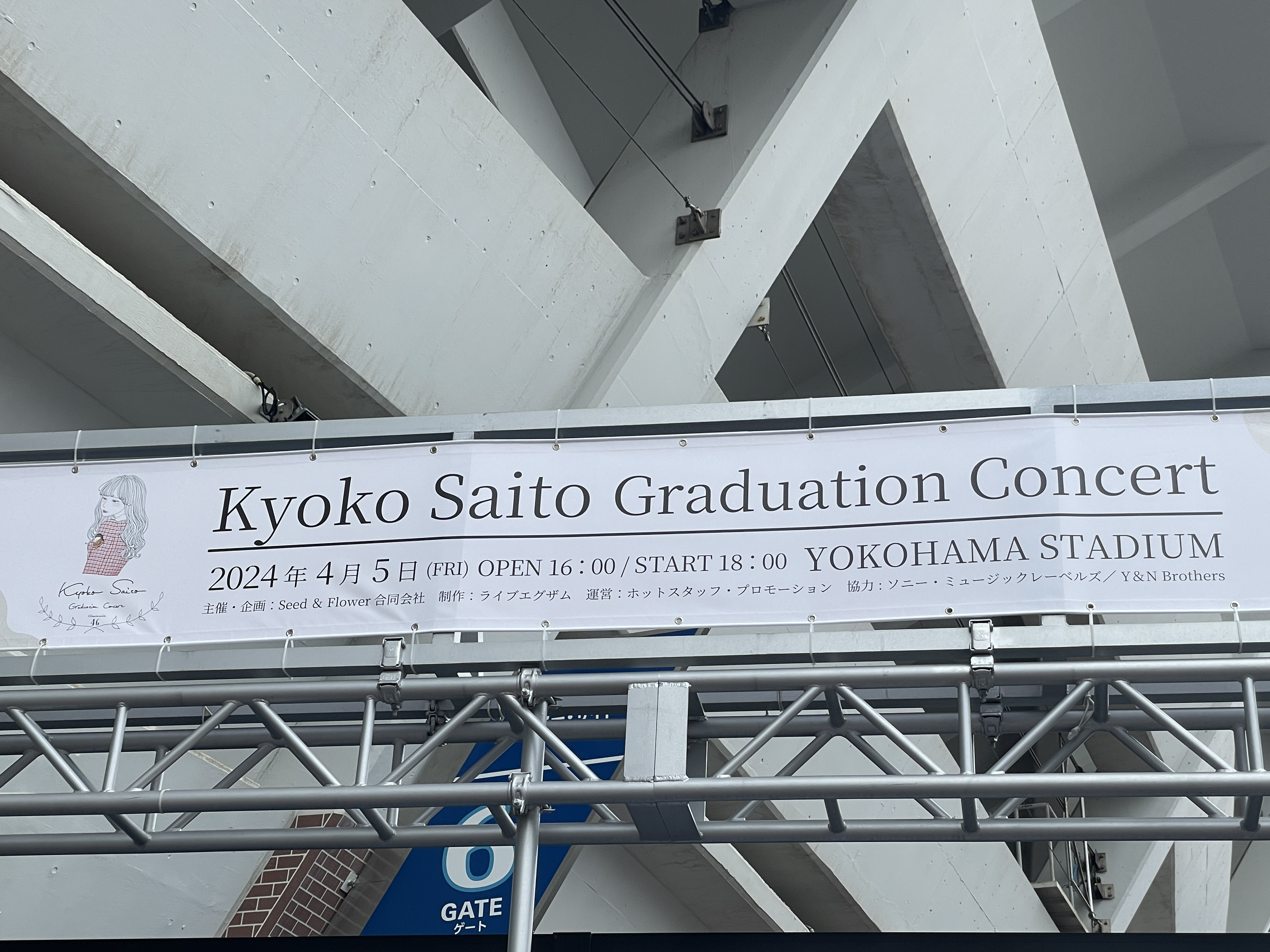
Sign at Yokohama Stadium for Saitō's "graduation" concert

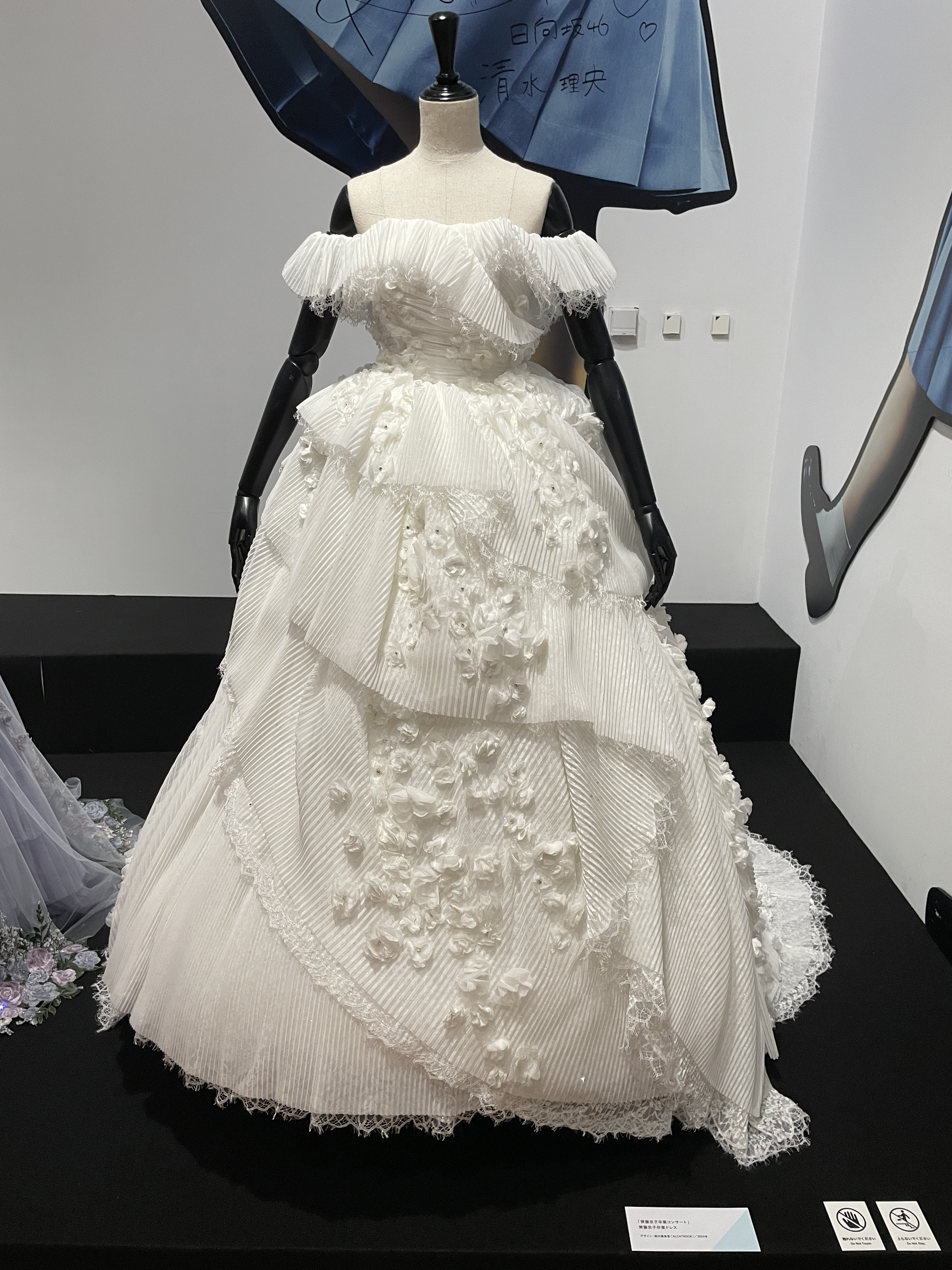
Dress worn by Saitō in her graduation concert

On January 11, 2024, Saitō announced that she would leave Hinatazaka46 on April 5. Her "graduation" concert was held on the same day at the Yokohama Stadium, which was also the day before Hinatazaka46's 2-day 5th Hinatansai anniversary concert at the same venue. Her final participation on a Hinatazaka46 music release was for the 11th single, "Kimi wa Honeydew", serving as the center for "Boku ni Tsuzuke" (僕に続け; lit. 'Follow Me'), which was performed by the entire group.

=== 2024–present: Solo career ===
In May 2024, Saitō announced that she had signed with the Toho Entertainment talent agency and intended to further pursue acting. She continued her role as April O'Neil in the Japanese dub of the Tales of the Teenage Mutant Ninja Turtles animated series, which premiered in December.

In 2025, the film Love on Trial (恋愛裁判, Ren'ai Saiban), directed by Koji Fukada with Saitō as lead character Mai, was selected for the Cannes Premiere section at the 2025 Cannes Film Festival. She attended the premiere on May 22, her first appearance at an international film festival. Her performance was critically acclaimed; Screendaily noted that she brought an "inherent veracity" to her performance, while Josh Slater-Williams of IndieWire commented that she brought in details that were "palpably drawn from a place of personal resonance" as a former idol herself. The Japan Times remarked that she exuded the "weariness of someone beyond her years", making Mai's personal journey "modestly compelling".

The audition and entertainment information site Deview placed Saitō second on its 2026 Next Breakout Ranking for actresses, released on January 30, 2026, with fellow former Hinatazaka46 member Yūka Kageyama on first place. Following Kyoccorohee's loss of its national network slot, a live show billed "Kyoko Saito × Hiccorohee: A Live Show at Tokyo Dream Park Where They Steel Their Resolve and Finally __" (齊藤京子×ヒコロヒーが東京ドリームパークで腹くくって最後に○○するライブ) was held on May 4 at the SGC Hall Ariake, attended by 3700 audience and featuring multiple guests, including fellow former Hinatazaka46 founding members Kumi Sasaki and Mirei Sasaki, with the "surprise" at the end being them expressing their "gratitude" to the show's audience and crew. The duo also held their first outdoor public recording, "Midsummer Kyoccoro-festival! in Summer Fes" (真夏のキョコロ祭り!in SUMMER FES) on August 3 at the Summer Fes Live Arena (Roppongi Hills Arena), featuring Suzuka Tomita as guest.

In October 2026, her 10th year in the entertainment industry, Saitō announced her solo singing debut under Sony Music. Her first song, "Genki ni Shiteta?" (元気にしてた？; lit. 'How Have You Been?'), would be released digitally on October 21, and her debut concert as a soloist has been scheduled for February 28, 2027 at the Kanadevia Hall, Tokyo.

== Filmography ==
=== Film ===
Year	Title	Role	Notes	Ref(s)
2023	Teenage Mutant Ninja Turtles: Mutant Mayhem	April O'Neil (Japanese dub)		
2025	#Iwilltellyouthetruth	An acquaintance of Kiriyama		
2025	Love Song	Hikari	Thai-Japanese film	
2025	Love on Trial	Mai Yamaoka	Lead role	
2026	Kyojo: Reunion	Maimi		
2026	Kyojo: Requiem	Maimi		

=== Television series ===
Year	Title	Role	Notes	Ref(s)
2017	Re:Mind	Kyōko Saitō		
2020	Dasada	Makoto Ogasawara		
2021	Borderless	Kiri Katayama		
2023	Actress	Kiri Katayama		
2023	Muddy Dining Table (Note: 泥濘の食卓, Nukarumi no Shokutaku)	Mia Nejiki	Lead role	
2024	Renai Senryaku Kaigi	Akane Mugita		
2024	Doraemon Birthday Special: Nobita and the Greek Cake Legend	Bard (voice)		
2024	Tales of the Teenage Mutant Ninja Turtles	April O'Neil (Japanese dub)		
2025	Sudden Marriage (Note: いきなり婚, Ikinari Kon)	Mao Koshiba	Lead role	
2025	Suspicious Partner (Note: あやしいパートナー, Ayashii Partner)	Sakura Yamashita	Lead role	
2026	Surname Confidential (Note: 夫婦別姓刑事(でか), Fūfu Bessei Deka)	Aya Gunji		
2026	Gate24: The Border	Nozomi Endō		

=== Variety show ===
Year	Title	Notes	Ref(s)
2018	Hiragana Keyakizaka46 Ramen Daisuki, Saitō Kyōko Desu		
2021–present	Kyoccorohee		
2026	Another Sky	January 24 guest; visited Seoul, South Korea	

=== Web shorts ===
Web short
- Buta no Shinju on TikTok

Year	Title	Role	Notes	Ref(s)
2026	Buta no Shinju (Note: 豚の真珠; transl. Pearl Before Swine)	Chika	Lead role; produced by winner of the TikTok Toho Film Festival 2024	

=== Commercials ===
Commercials
- Sony Assurance "Spirit of the Car" on X
- "Everyone's Yakult" on Instagram
- Nurse Senka series on YouTube
- "HiruMac" on Instagram

- Sony Assurance "Spirit of the Car" (2022)
- Yakult "Everyone's Yakult" (theme song only) (2023)
- Nurse Senka (2024−2026)
- McDonald's Japan "HiruMac" (2026)

== Discography ==
=== Single ===
Music videos
- "Genki ni Shiteta?" on YouTube

Singles
Year	Title	Peak chart positions	Notes	Ref(s)
Year	Title	JPN Oricon	Notes	Ref(s)
2026	"Genki ni Shiteta?" (元気にしてた？; lit. 'How Have You Been?')	TBA		

=== Hiragana Keyakizaka46/Hinatazaka46 ===
During her time with Hiragana Keyakizaka46 and Hinatazaka46, Saitō was assigned to the formation front lines of almost all the title songs in which she took part. Notable appearances include:

- "Soredemo Aruiteru" (それでも歩いてる; lit. 'Keep Walking Anyway') (2017, released on "Kaze ni Fukarete mo"), center (lead performer), theme song for Re:Mind
- "Igokochiwaruku Otona ni Natta" (居心地悪く大人になった; lit. 'Uncomfortably Became an Adult') (2018, released on Hashiridasu Shunkan), solo song
- "Tsuki to Hoshi ga Odoru Midnight" (月と星が踊るMidnight; lit. 'The Moon and Stars Dance at Midnight') (2022), center
- "Kodoku na Toki" (孤独な瞬間(とき); lit. 'Lonely Time') (2022, released on "Tsuki to Hoshi ga Odoru Midnight"), solo song
- "Boku ni Tsuzuke" (僕に続け; lit. 'Follow Me') (2024, released on "Kimi wa Honeydew"), center

=== Kyoccorohee ===
- "After You!" (2024), digital single, debut song

=== Sakamichi AKB ===
- "Hatsukoi Door" (初恋ドア, Hatsukoi Doa; lit. 'First Love Door') (2019, released on "Jiwaru Days")

== Solo concerts ==
- MTV Live Sessions: Kyoko Saito from Hinatazaka46 (broadcast only, June 5, 2022)
- MTV Unplugged Presents: Kyoko Saito from Hinatazaka46 (Pia Arena MM, May 21, 2023)

== Theater ==
Year	Title	Role(s)	Venue(s)	Ref(s)
2018	Ayumi	Multiple	AiiA 2.5 Theater Tokyo	
2018	Magia Record	Kyoko Sakura	Akasaka ACT Theater	
2019	Sazae-san	Wakame	Meiji-za, Tokyo; Hakata-za, Fukuoka	

== Radio ==
- Imadoki (2019–2020, MBS Radio), weekly host
- Appare Yattemasu! (2020–2024, MBS Radio), weekly host
- Kyōko Saitō's All Night Nippon X (October 23, 2026, Nippon Broadcasting System), special host

== Bibliography ==
Title	Release date	Publisher	ISBN
Totteoki no Koibito (とっておきの恋人; lit. 'Special Lover', photobook)	January 19, 2021	Shufu to Seikatsu Sha	ISBN 978-4391154979
