= Strawberry Night =

- Based on: Invisible Rain by Tetsuya Honda
- Starring: Yuko Takeuchi; Takao Osawa; Hidetoshi Nishijima
- Music by: Yuki Hayashi
- Release date: 26 January 2013 (Japan)
- Country: Japan
- Language: Japanese

Strawberry Night (ストロベリーナイト) is a Japanese film based on Tetsuya Honda's detective novel by the same name. It was released in theaters on 23 January 2013.

== Cast ==
- Yuko Takeuchi as Reiko Himekawa
- Takao Osawa as Isao Makita
- Hidetoshi Nishijima as Kazuo Kikuta
- Keisuke Koide
- Ryuhei Maruyama
- Tetsuya Takeda
- Tomokazu Miura
- Shota Sometani
- Ken Kaneko
- Nobuaki Kaneko
- Goro Ibuki
- Renji Ishibashi
- Tetsushi Tanaka
