= List of Hot 100 number-one singles of 2019 (Japan) =

The following is a list of number-one singles on the Billboard Japan Hot 100 chart in 2019.

== Chart history ==
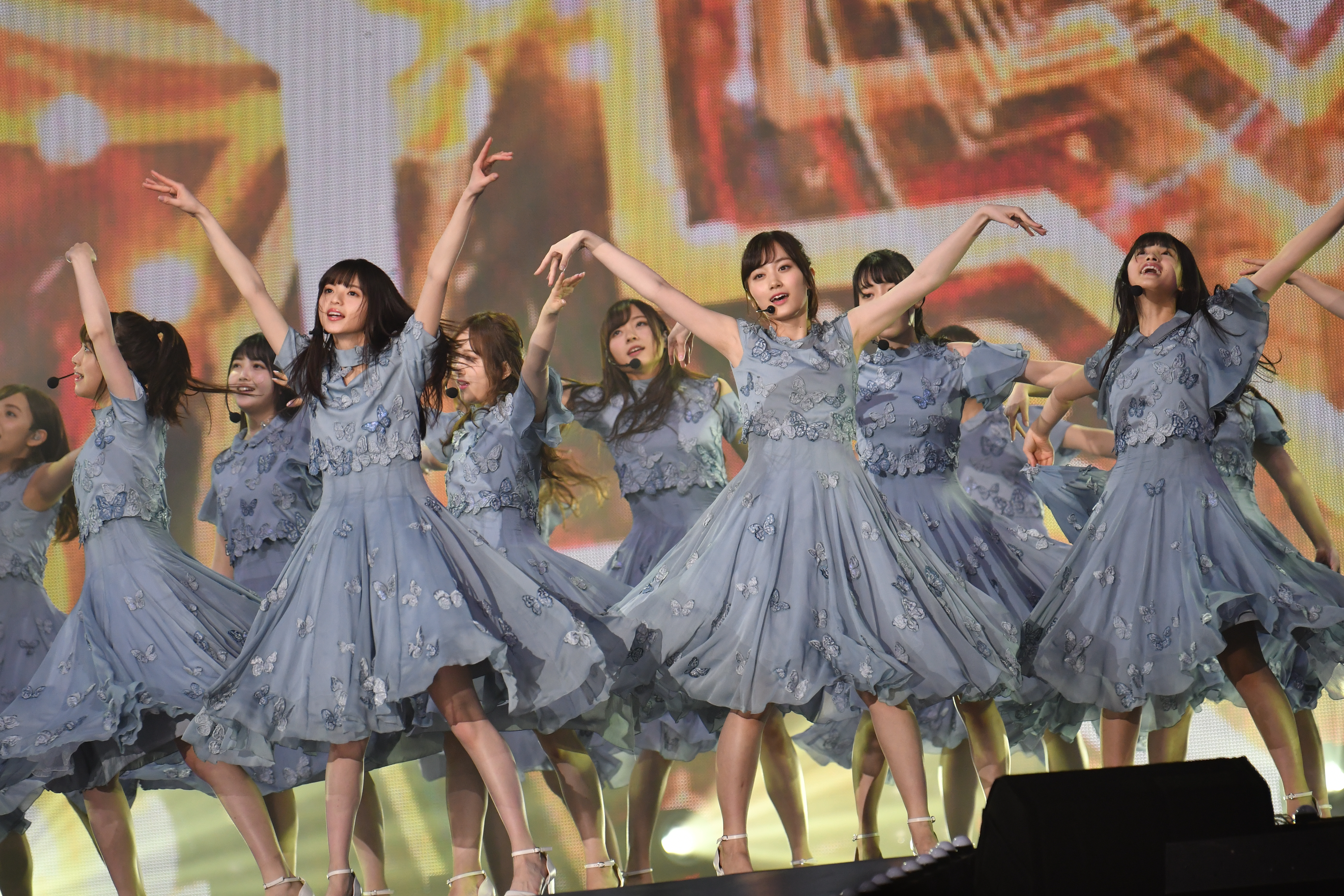
Nogizaka46 scored two number-one singles with "Sing Out!" and "Yoake Made Tsuyogaranakutemoii".

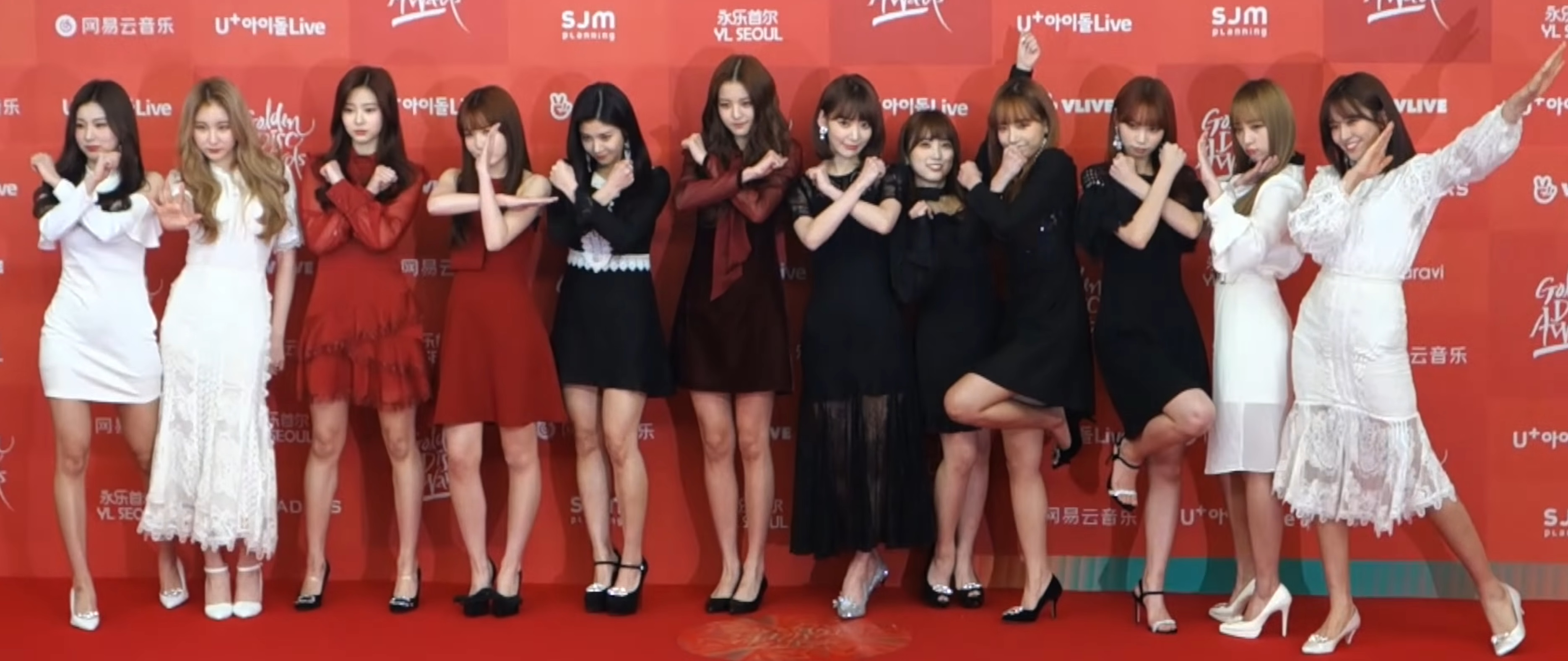
Iz*One scored two number-one singles with "Buenos Aires" and "Vampire".

Issue date	Song	Artist(s)	Ref.
January 7	"Lemon"	Kenshi Yonezu	
January 14	"Lemon"	Kenshi Yonezu	
January 21	"Lemon"	Kenshi Yonezu	
January 28	"Lemon"	Kenshi Yonezu	
February 4	"Lemon"	Kenshi Yonezu	
February 11	"Homechigirist"	Johnny's West	
February 18	"Kimi o Daisuki da"	Kis-My-Ft2	
February 25	"Kaze o Matsu"	STU48	
March 4	"Tokonoma Seiza Musume"	NMB48	
March 11	"Kuroi Hitsuji"	Keyakizaka46	
March 18	"Crystal"	Kanjani Eight	
March 25	"Jiwaru Days"	AKB48	
April 1	"Uchōten Shooter"	Matsuri Nine	
April 8	"Kyun"	Hinatazaka46	
April 15	"Kimi o Matteru"	King & Prince	
April 22	"Ishi"	HKT48	
April 29	"Otona Survivor"	Last Idol	
May 6	"Ame Nochi Hare"	Johnny's West	
May 13	"Marigold"	Aimyon	
May 20	"Dark Knight"	One n' Only	
May 27	"Rain"	Kazuya Kamenashi	
June 3	"Lucky-Unlucky"	Hey! Say! JUMP	
June 10	"Sing Out!"	Nogizaka46	
June 17	"Spirits of the Sea"	Kenshi Yonezu	
June 24	"Top Gun"	NEWS	
July 1	"Change"	Tomohisa Yamashita	
July 8	"Buenos Aires"	Iz*One	
July 15	"Lights"	BTS	
July 22	"Hands Up"	Kis-My-Ft2	
July 29	"Do Re Mi Sol La Si Do"	Hinatazaka46	
August 5	"Breakthrough"	Twice	
August 12	"Daisuki na Hito"	STU48	
August 19	"Scarlet"	Sandaime J Soul Brothers featuring Afrojack	
August 26	"Bokō o Kaere!"	NMB48	
September 2	"Fanfare!"	Hey! Say! JUMP	
September 9	"Koi-Wazurai"	King & Prince	
September 16	"Yoake Made Tsuyogaranakutemoii"	Nogizaka46	
September 23	"Uma to Shika"	Kenshi Yonezu	
September 30	"Sustainable"	AKB48	
October 7	"Vampire"	Iz*One	
October 14	"Konna ni Suki ni Natchatte Ii no?"	Hinatazaka46	
October 21	"Big Shot!!"	Johnny's West	
October 28	"Pretender"	Official Hige Dandism	
November 4	"Kirin no Ko"	Sexy Zone	
November 11	"Zurui yo Zurui ne"	=Love	
November 18	"Hatsukoi Shijō Shugi"	NMB48	
November 25	"Edge of Days"	Kis-My-Ft2	
December 2	"Pretender"	Official Hige Dandism	
December 9	"Tomo yo"	Kanjani Eight	
December 16	"Hikari no Kehai"	KinKi Kids	
December 23	"Pretender"	Official Hige Dandism	
December 30	"Pretender"	Official Hige Dandism	
