= Love on Trial =

2025 film by Koji Fukada

- Theatrical release poster

Japanese name
- Kana: 恋愛裁判
Transcriptions
- Revised Hepburn: Ren'ai Saiban
- Directed by: Koji Fukada
- Written by: Koji Fukada; Shintaro Mitani
- Produced by: Shin Yamaguchi; Yoko Abe; Atsuko Ôno
- Starring: Kyōko Saitō; Erika Karata; Kenjiro Tsuda
- Cinematography: Hidetoshi Shinomiya
- Edited by: Sylvie Lager
- Music by: Takaaki Yamamoto
- Production companies: Toho; Survivance
- Distributed by: Toho (Japan); Survivance (France)
- Release dates: 22 May 2025 (Cannes); 23 January 2026 (Japan)
- Running time: 124 minutes
- Countries: Japan; France
- Language: Japanese

Love on Trial (Japanese: 恋愛裁判, Hepburn: Ren'ai Saiban) is a 2025 romance drama film written and directed by Koji Fukada. Starring Kyōko Saitō, Erika Karata, and Kenjiro Tsuda, it follows a J-pop idol who finds herself sued by her agency for breaking the "no-relationship" clause in her contract.

The film had its world premiere at the Cannes Premiere section of the 78th Cannes Film Festival on 22 May 2025. It was theatrically released in Japan on 26 January 2026 by Toho.

== Plot ==
The story follows Mai Yamaoka, a rising J-pop idol whose ascent is derailed when she falls in love, violating her contract's "no relationship" clause. After her romance is exposed, Mai finds herself not only vilified by her fanbase but also facing a real-life courtroom battle, as her agency sues her for damages.

== Cast ==
- Kyōko Saitō as Mai Yamaoka
- Erika Karata as Saya Yabuki
- Kenjiro Tsuda as Koichi Yoshida
- Yuna Nakamura as Nanaka Shimizu
- Yuki Kura as Takashi Mayama
- Hinano Sakura as Himena Tsujimoto
- Mitsuki Imamura as Minami Miura
- Miyu Ogawa as Risa Ōtani

== Release ==
Love on Trial had its World Premiere at the 78th Cannes Film Festival on 22 May 2025, and competed for Cannes Premiere.

The film will be screened in the 'A Window on Asian Cinema' section of the 30th Busan International Film Festival on September 19, 2025. On October 28, 2025, the film was showcased at the 38th Tokyo International Film Festival in 'Gala Selection' section.

It will be released on January 26, 2026 in Japanese theatres by Toho.

== Reception ==
Jessica Kiang of Variety described the film as "a murmured critique of Japanese celebrity culture". Josh Slater-Williams of IndieWire praised Saito's performance as "brings in a few performance details that are palpably drawn from a place of personal resonance".
