= Yoake Made Tsuyogaranakutemoii =

2019 single by Nogizaka46

- Type A cover

Single by Nogizaka46

from the album Time Flies
- B-side: "Boku no Koto, Shitteru?"; "Romendensha no Machi" (Type-A); "Toshoshitsu no Kimi e" (Type-B); "Tokidoki Omoidashite Kudasai" (Type-C); "~Do my best~ Ja Imi wa Nai" (Type-D); "Boku no Omoikomi" (Regular)
- Released: 4 September 2019 (Japan)
- Genre: J-pop
- Label: N46Div.
- Composer: Yusuke Yamada
- Lyricist: Yasushi Akimoto
- Producer: Yasushi Akimoto

Nogizaka46 singles chronology
"Sing Out!" (2019)	"Yoake Made Tsuyogaranakutemoii" (2019)	"Shiawase no Hogoshoku" (2020)

Music video
- "Yoake Made Tsuyogaranakutemoii" on YouTube

"Yoake Made Tsuyogaranakutemoii" (Japanese: 夜明けまで強がらなくてもいい; "You don't pretend to be strong until dawn") is the 24th single by Japanese idol group Nogizaka46. The single was released on 4 September 2019. It reached number-one on the weekly Oricon Singles Chart and remained on the chart for twenty-four weeks. Additionally, the single was also number-one on the Billboard Japan Hot 100.

The center position of the title track is held by Sakura Endo, a fourth generation member; additionally, two other fourth generation members, Haruka Kaki and Ayame Tsutsui, were placed in the first row. This single marks the first time a fourth generation member participated in a title track or held a center position. It is also the last single that former captain Reika Sakurai participated in.

== Release ==
This single was released in 5 versions. Type-A, Type-B, Type-C, Type-D and a regular edition.

== Track listing ==
All lyrics written by Yasushi Akimoto.

=== Type-A ===
CD
No.	Title	Length
1.	"Yoake Made Tsuyogaranakutemoii (夜明けまで強がらなくてもいい)"	4:20
2.	"Boku no Koto, Shitteru? (僕のこと、知ってる?)"	4:50
3.	"Romendensha no Machi (路面電車の街)"	5:25
4.	"Yoake Made Tsuyogaranakutemoii" (off vocal ver.)	4:20
5.	"Boku no Koto, Shitteru?" (off vocal ver.)	4:50
6.	"Romendensha no Machi" (off vocal ver.)	5:25

=== Type-B ===
CD
No.	Title	Length
1.	"Yoake Made Tsuyogaranakutemoii (夜明けまで強がらなくてもいい)"	4:20
2.	"Boku no Koto, Shitteru? (僕のこと、知ってる?)"	4:50
3.	"Toshoshitsu no Kimi e (図書室の君へ)"	4:01
4.	"Yoake Made Tsuyogaranakutemoii" (off vocal ver.)	4:20
5.	"Boku no Koto, Shitteru?" (off vocal ver.)	4:50
6.	"Toshoshitsu no Kimi e" (off vocal ver.)	4:01

=== Type-C ===
CD
No.	Title	Length
1.	"Yoake Made Tsuyogaranakutemoii (夜明けまで強がらなくてもいい)"	4:20
2.	"Boku no Koto, Shitteru? (僕のこと、知ってる?)"	4:50
3.	"Tokidoki Omoidashite Kudasai (時々 思い出してください)"	5:25
4.	"Yoake Made Tsuyogaranakutemoii" (off vocal ver.)	4:20
5.	"Boku no Koto, Shitteru?" (off vocal ver.)	4:50
6.	"Tokidoki Omoidashite Kudasai" (off vocal ver.)	5:25

=== Type-D ===
CD
No.	Title	Length
1.	"Yoake Made Tsuyogaranakutemoii (夜明けまで強がらなくてもいい)"	4:20
2.	"Boku no Koto, Shitteru? (僕のこと、知ってる?)"	4:50
3.	"~Do my best~ Ja Imi wa Nai (〜Do my best〜じゃ意味はない)"	3:56
4.	"Yoake Made Tsuyogaranakutemoii" (off vocal ver.)	4:20
5.	"Boku no Koto, Shitteru?" (off vocal ver.)	4:50
6.	"~Do my best~ Ja Imi wa Nai" (off vocal ver.)	3:56

=== Regular Edition ===
CD
No.	Title	Length
1.	"Yoake Made Tsuyogaranakutemoii (夜明けまで強がらなくてもいい)"	4:20
2.	"Boku no Koto, Shitteru? (僕のこと、知ってる?)"	4:50
3.	"Boku no Omoikomi (僕の思い込み)"	3:46
4.	"Yoake Made Tsuyogaranakutemoii" (off vocal ver.)	4:20
5.	"Boku no Koto, Shitteru?" (off vocal ver.)	4:50
6.	"Boku no Omoikomi" (off vocal ver.)	3:46

== Participating members ==
=== Yoake Made Tsuyogaranakutemoii ===
Centre: Sakura Endō

3rd Row: Minami Umezawa, Hinako Kitano, Kazumi Takayama, Shiori Kubo, Manatsu Akimoto, Minami Hoshino, Mai Shinuchi

2nd Row: Mizuki Yamashita, Erika Ikuta, Mai Shiraishi, Sayuri Matsumura, Reika Sakurai, Yūki Yoda

1st Row: Miona Hori, Haruka Kaki, Sakura Endō (center), Ayame Tsutsui, Asuka Saitō

=== "Boku no Koto, Shitteru?" ===
Sing Out Senbatsu:

Centre: Asuka Saitō

1st Generation: Manatsu Akimoto, Erika Ikuta, Sayuri Inoue, Asuka Saitō, Reika Sakurai, Mai Shiraishi, Kazumi Takayama, Minami Hoshino, Sayuri Matsumura

2nd Generation: Hinako Kitano, Mai Shinuchi, Ayane Suzuki, Miona Hori, Miria Watanabe

3rd Generation: Riria Itō, Renka Iwamoto, Minami Umezawa, Momoko Ōzono, Shiori Kubo, Tamami Sakaguchi, Kaede Satō, Yūki Yoda

=== Romendensha no Machi ===
Asuka Saitō, Miona Hori, Mizuki Yamashita

=== "Toshoshitsu no Kimi e" ===
4th Generation:

Centre: Sayaka Kakehashi

4th Generation: Sakura Endo, Haruka Kaki, Sayaka Kakehashi, Saya Kanagawa, Yuri Kitagawa, Yuna Shibata, Rei Seimiya, Mayu Tamura, Ayame Tsutsui, Seira Hayakawa, Mio Yakubo

=== “Tokidoki Omoidashite Kudasai" ===
Reika Sakurai

=== "~Do my best~ Ja Imi wa Nai" ===
Under Members:

Centre: Renka Iwamoto

1st Generation: Kana Nakada, Hina Higuchi, Maaya Wada

2nd Generation: Junna Itō, Kotoko Sasaki, Ayane Suzuki, Ranze Terada, Rena Yamazaki, Miria Watanabe

3rd Generation: Riria Itō, Renka Iwamoto, Tamami Sakaguchi, Kaede Satō, Reno Nakamura, Hazuki Mukai, Ayano Christie Yoshida

=== "Boku no Omoikomi" ===
Senbatsu (選抜)

Centre: Sakura Endō

1st Generation: Manatsu Akimoto, Erika Ikuta, Asuka Saitō, Reika Sakurai, Mai Shiraishi, Kazumi Takayama, Minami Hoshino, Sayuri Matsumura

2nd Generation: Hinako Kitano, Mai Shinuchi, Miona Hori

3rd Generation: Minami Umezawa, Shiori Kubo, Mizuki Yamashita, Yūki Yoda

4th Generation: Sakura Endō, Haruka Kaki, Ayame Tsutsui

== Chart performance ==
=== Oricon ===
Chart	Peak	Debut Sales	Sales Total
Weekly Singles Chart	1	965,000	

=== Billboard Japan ===
Chart	Peak	Debut Sales	Sales Total
Japan Hot 100	1	1,019,039	

=== Year-end ===
Chart (2019)	Position
Japan (Japan Hot 100)	19
