= Sakurazuki =

- Type A cover

Single by Sakurazaka46

from the album Addiction
- B-side: "Cool" (all versions); "Sono Hi Made" (regular); "Munen" (Type A); "Moshikashitara Shinjitsu" (Type B); "Tamashii no Liar" (Type C); "Natsu no Chikamichi" (Type D)
- Released: February 15, 2023
- Genre: J-pop
- Length: 4:42
- Label: Sony Music Japan
- Composer: NAZCA
- Lyricist: Yasushi Akimoto

Sakurazaka46 singles chronology
"Samidare yo" (2022)	"Sakurazuki" (2023)	"Start over!" (2023)

Music video
- "Sakurazuki" on YouTube

"Sakurazuki" (桜月) is the fifth single by the Japanese idol group Sakurazaka46 after their 2020 renaming. The song is written by Yasushi Akimoto and is composed by NAZCA. It was released on February 15, 2023 by Sony Music Entertainment. The title track features Moriya Rena as the center.

== Background and Release ==
The single was announced on the second day of Sakurazaka46's "2nd YEAR ANNIVERSARY ~ Buddies Thanksgiving ~" concert on December 9, 2022 which was held at Nippon Budokan, Tokyo. Following the single announcement, the formation of the title track was announced at the end of the 113th episode of Soko Magattara, Sakurazaka? which was aired on the December 25, 2023. (Note: Actual broadcast time is early morning of December 26, 2023 but Japan broadcasting adopts a timing system that goes past 24-hour so early morning of a certain day will still be counted as part of the previous date.)

The single title was then announced on January 4, 2023.

On January 18, 2023, the album artwork was revealed for the first time on Sakurazaka46's official site.

On February 1, 2023, the contents (track listing) of each CD types were revealed. This single is released in five types: Limited edition features 4 types A, B, C, D with Blu-ray included, and a CD-only regular edition type.

This single was released 10 months after the release of their previous single "Samidare yo". This is also the last single feature Yumiko Seki who will graduate from the group after this single. Further, the 3rd generation members also participated in this single with the B-side song "Natsu no Chikamichi" (夏の近道).

The title song "Sakurazuki" was performed for the first time on the February 10, 2023 broadcast of Music Station 2-hour SP (TV Asahi).

== Album Artwork ==
Members on the Jacket Picture
Type A	Rena Moriya
Type B	Minami Koike, Yui Kobayashi
Type C	Hono Tamura, Hikaru Morita, Ten Yamasaki, Karin Fujiyoshi, Rei Ōzono
Type D	Rina Matsuda, Rena Moriya, Rina Inoue, Mizuho Habu, Kira Masumoto, Yui Takemoto
Regular Edition	Akihō Onuma, Yumiko Seki, Fuyuka Saitō, Rei Ōzono, Marino Kōsaka, Rina Uemura, Hikari Endō

== Track listing ==
=== Type A ===
CD - Disc 1
No.	Title	Length
1.	"Sakurazuki" (桜月)	4:42
2.	"Cool"	4:17
3.	"Munen" (無念)	4:25
4.	"Sakurazuki" (桜月; off vocal version)	4:42
5.	"Cool" (off vocal version)	4:17
6.	"Munen" (無念; off vocal version)	4:24

W-KEYAKI FES.2022 Director's Cut Collections <DAY1> - Blu-ray - Disc 2
No.	Title	Length
1.	"Taiyou wa miageru hito wo erabanai" (太陽は見上げる人を選ばない)
2.	"Overture"
3.	"Buddies"
4.	"Naze koi wo shitekonakattandarou?" (なぜ 恋をして来なかったんだろう?)
5.	"Utsukushiki Nervous" (美しきNervous)
6.	"I'm in"
7.	"Omottayori mo sabishikunai" (思ったよりも寂しくない)
8.	"BAN"
9.	"Masatsukeisu" (摩擦係数)

=== Type B ===
CD - Disc 1
No.	Title	Length
1.	"Sakurazuki" (桜月)	4:42
2.	"Cool"	4:17
3.	"Moshikashitara Shinjitsu" (もしかしたら真実)	3:43
4.	"Sakurazuki" (桜月; off vocal version)	4:42
5.	"Cool" (off vocal version)	4:17
6.	"Moshikashitara Shinjitsu" (もしかしたら真実; off vocal version)	3:41

W-KEYAKI FES.2022 Director's Cut Collections <DAY2> - Blu-ray - Disc 2
No.	Title	Length
1.	"Samidare yo" (五月雨よ)
2.	"Mugon no Uchū" (無言の宇宙)
3.	"Concentration" (コンセントレーション)
4.	"Kaleidoscope" (カレイドスコープ)
5.	"Message from Aoi Harada and Rika Ozeki"
6.	"Ongaku Shitsu ni Kataomoi ~ Bathroom Travel" (音楽室に片想い～バスルームトラベル)
7.	"Ballet to Shōnen" (バレエと少年)
8.	"MC"
9.	"Abunakkashii Keikaku" (危なっかしい計画)

=== Type C ===
CD - Disc 1
No.	Title	Length
1.	"Sakurazuki" (桜月)	4:42
2.	"Cool"	4:17
3.	"Tamashii no Liar" (魂のLiar)	4:18
4.	"Sakurazuki" (桜月; off vocal version)	4:42
5.	"Cool" (off vocal version)	4:17
6.	"Tamashii no Liar" (魂のLiar; off vocal version)	4:16

Blu-ray - Disc 2
No.	Title	Length
1.	"Collection of secret videos of members lying on the manager's phone (2021 edition)"

=== Type D ===
CD - Disc 1
No.	Title	Length
1.	"Sakurazuki" (桜月)	4:42
2.	"Cool"	4:17
3.	"Natsu no Chikamichi" (夏の近道)	5:08
4.	"Sakurazuki" (桜月; off vocal version)	4:42
5.	"Cool" (off vocal version)	4:17
6.	"Natsu no Chikamichi" (夏の近道; off vocal version)	5:07

Blu-ray - Disc 2
No.	Title	Length
1.	"マネージャーのスマホに眠るメンバーの秘蔵動画集<2022年編>" (Collection of secret videos of members lying on the manager's phone (2022 edition))

=== Regular Edition ===
CD - Disc 1
No.	Title	Length
1.	"Sakurazuki" (桜月)	4:42
2.	"Cool"	4:17
3.	"Sono Hi Made" (その日まで)	4:27
4.	"Sakurazuki" (桜月; off vocal version)	4:42
5.	"Cool" (off vocal version)	4:17
6.	"Sono Hi Made" (その日まで; off vocal version)	4:25

== Participating Members ==
=== Sakurazuki ===
Center: Rena Moriya

- 3rd Row: Yui Takemoto, Rina Matsuda, Mizuho Habu, Kira Masumoto, Rina Inoue
- 2nd Row: Ten Yamasaki, Rei Ōzono, Hikaru Morita, Hono Tamura, Karin Fujiyoshi
- 1st Row: Yui Kobayashi, Rena Moriya, Minami Koike

This is Rena Moriya's (2nd Generation) first time holding the center position. Among members coming from Sakamichi Kenshusei (including those in Nogizaka46 and Hinatazaka46), Rena Moriya is the first one to serve as a center for a group single. Further, Rei Ōzono (2nd generation) who was also part of Sakamichi Kenshusei participated as Sakura Eight for the first time and this is also Kira Masumoto's first time making it into senbatsu. In addition, the second row members have all had previous experience as centers.

=== Cool ===
Center: Rei Ōzono

- 3rd Row: Yumiko Seki, Akiho Ōnuma, Fuyuka Saitō, Rina Uemura, Marino Kōsaka, Hikari Endō
- 2nd Row: Hikaru Morita, Karin Fujiyoshi, Ten Yamasaki, Hono Tamura, Rena Moriya
- 1st Row: Yui Kobayashi, Rei Ōzono, Minami Koike

=== Munen (無念) ===
Center: Rina Matsuda

- Rina Uemura, Fuyuka Saitō, Mizuho Habu, Rina Inoue, Hikari Endō, Akiho Ōnuma, Marino Kōsaka, Yumiko Seki, Yui Takemoto, Kira Masumoto, Rina Matsuda

=== Moshikattara Shinjitsu (もしかしたら真実) ===
Center: Rena Moriya

- Minami Koike, Yui Kobayashi, Mizuho Habu, Rina Inoue, Rei Ōzono, Yui Takemoto, Hono Tamura, Karin Fujiyoshi, Kira Masumoto, Rina Matsuda, Hikaru Morita, Rena Moriya, Ten Yamasaki

=== Tamashii no Liar (魂のLiar) ===
Center: Rena Moriya

- Rina Uemura, Minami Koike, Yui Kobayashi, Fuyuka Saitō, Mizuho Habu, Rina Inoue, Hikari Endō, Rei Ōzono, Akiho Ōnuma, Marino Kōsaka, Yumiko Seki, Yui Takemoto, Hono Tamura, Karin Fujiyoshi, Kira Masumoto, Rina Matsuda, Hikaru Morita, Rena Moriya, Ten Yamasaki

=== Natsu no Chikamichi (夏の近道) ===
Center: Airi Taniguchi

- 2nd Row: Yū Murai, Yuzuki Nakashima, Reina Odakura, Nagisa Kojima, Rika Ishimori, Riko Endō, Itoha Mukai, Shizuki Yamashita
- 1st Row: Mio Matono, Airi Taniguchi, Miu Murayama

=== Sono Hi Made (その日まで) ===
Center: Yūka Sugai

- Rina Uemura, Minami Koike, Yui Kobayashi, Fuyuka Saitō, Yūka Sugai, Mizuho Habu, Rina Inoue, Hikari Endō, Rei Ōzono, Akiho Ōnuma, Marino Kōsaka, Yumiko Seki, Yui Takemoto, Hono Tamura, Karin Fujiyoshi, Kira Masumoto, Rina Matsuda, Hikaru Morita, Rena Moriya, Ten Yamasaki

== Chart performance ==
Chart positions, sales, and certifications
Title	Year	Peak chart positions		Sales	Certifications
Title	Year	JPN	JPN Hot	Sales	Certifications
Sakurazuki (桜月)	2023	1	2	JPN: 386,312 (phy.); JPN: 4,104 (dig.)	RIAJ: Platinum (phy.)
