= Sing Out! (song) =

2019 single by Nogizaka46

- Type-A cover

Single by Nogizaka46

from the album Time Flies
- B-side: "Kassōro"; "No Yōna Sonzai" (Type-A); "Am I Loving?" (Type-B); "Heikōsen" (Type-C); "Yonbanme no Hikari" (Type-D); "Aimai" (Regular)
- Released: 29 May 2019 (Japan)
- Genre: J-pop
- Length: 5:25
- Label: N46Div.
- Producer: Yasushi Akimoto

Nogizaka46 singles chronology
| "Kaerimichi wa Tōmawari Shitaku Naru" (2018) | "Sing Out!" (2019) | "Yoake Made Tsuyogaranakutemoii" (2019) |

Music video
- "Sing Out!" on YouTube

"Sing Out!" is the 23rd single by Japanese idol girl group Nogizaka46. The center position of the title track is held by Asuka Saito. It was released on 29 May 2019. It reached number-one on the weekly Oricon Singles Chart with 1,004,000 copies sold. It was also number-one on the Billboard Japan Hot 100.

== Release ==
This single was released in 5 versions. Type-A, Type-B, Type-C, Type-D and a regular edition.

== Track listing ==
All lyrics written by Yasushi Akimoto.

=== Type-A ===
CD
| No. | Title | Length |
|---|---|---|
| 1. | "Sing Out!" | 5:25 |
| 2. | "Kassōro" (滑走路) | 4:14 |
| 3. | "No Yōna Sonzai" (のような存在) | 4:07 |
| 4. | "Sing Out! -off vocal ver.-" | 5:25 |
| 5. | "Kassōro -off vocal ver.-" | 4:14 |
| 6. | "No Yōna Sonzai -off vocal ver.-" | 4:05 |

=== Type-B ===
CD
| No. | Title | Length |
|---|---|---|
| 1. | "Sing Out!" | 5:25 |
| 2. | "Kassōro" | 4:14 |
| 3. | "Am I Loving?" | 3:53 |
| 4. | "Sing Out! -off vocal ver.-" | 5:25 |
| 5. | "Kassōro -off vocal ver.-" | 4:14 |
| 6. | "Am I Loving? -off vocal ver.-" | 3:52 |

=== Type-C ===
CD
| No. | Title | Length |
|---|---|---|
| 1. | "Sing Out!" | 5:25 |
| 2. | "Kassōro" | 4:14 |
| 3. | "Heikōsen" (平行線) | 3:48 |
| 4. | "Sing Out! -off vocal ver.-" | 5:25 |
| 5. | "Kassōro -off vocal ver.-" | 4:14 |
| 6. | "Heikōsen -off vocal ver.-" | 3:46 |

=== Type-D ===
CD
| No. | Title | Length |
|---|---|---|
| 1. | "Sing Out!" | 5:25 |
| 2. | "Kassōro" | 4:15 |
| 3. | "Yonbanme no Hikari" (4番目の光) | 4:10 |
| 4. | "Sing Out! -off vocal ver.-" | 5:25 |
| 5. | "Kassōro -off vocal ver.-" | 4:14 |
| 6. | "Yonbanme no Hikari -off vocal ver.-" | 4:09 |

=== Regular Edition ===
CD
| No. | Title | Length |
|---|---|---|
| 1. | "Sing Out!" | 5:25 |
| 2. | "Kassōro" | 4:14 |
| 3. | "Aimai" (曖昧) | 4:16 |
| 4. | "Sing Out! -off vocal ver.-" | 5:25 |
| 5. | "Kassōro -off vocal ver.-" | 4:14 |
| 6. | "Aimai -off vocal ver.-" | 4:15 |

== Participating members ==
=== "Sing Out!" ===
- Center: Asuka Saitō

3rd Row: Sayuri Inoue, Kaede Satō, Ayane Suzuki, Renka Iwamoto, Tamami Sakaguchi, Miria Watanabe, Riria Itō, Mai Shinuchi

2nd Row: Minami Umezawa, Hinako Kitano, Manatsu Akimoto, Shiori Kubo, Sayuri Matsumura, Minami Hoshino, Reika Sakurai

1st Row: Momoko Ōzono, Miona Hori, Erika Ikuta, Asuka Saitō, Mai Shiraishi, Kazumi Takayama, Yūki Yoda

== Chart performance ==
=== Oricon ===
| Chart | Peak | Debut Sales | Sales Total |
|---|---|---|---|
| Weekly Singles Chart | 1 | 1,004,259 | |

=== Billboard Japan ===
| Chart | Peak |
|---|---|
| Japan Hot 100 | 1 |

=== Year-end ===
| Chart (2019) | Position |
|---|---|
| Japan (Japan Hot 100) | 16 |
