= Lemino =

Japanese streaming service

- Website type: OTT streaming platform
- Available in: Japanese; English
- Area served: Japan; Thailand (Through TrueVision Now)
- Owners: Wowow; NTT Docomo
- Founders: Avex; NTT Docomo
- Key people: Satoshi Suzuki (CEO)
- Parent: Wowow Lemino, Inc.
- Website: lemino.docomo.ne.jp
- Registration: Optional
- Launched: November 18, 2011; 14 years ago (as D Market Video Store); April 12, 2023; 3 years ago (as Lemino)
- Current status: Active

Lemino (レミノ, Remino) is a Japanese video-on-demand streaming service operated by Wowow Lemino Inc., a joint venture in which premium satellite broadcaster Wowow holds a controlling 51 percent stake and NTT Docomo retains 49 percent. Originally established in 2011 as a joint venture between Avex (which held a 70% stake until 2022) and Docomo, the platform initially launched exclusively for Docomo mobile subscribers before opening to users of all mobile carriers in 2014. It operated strictly as a subscription video-on-demand (SVOD) service under successive names: d Market Video Store (dマーケット VIDEOストア) (2011–2013), d Video (dビデオ) (2013–2015), and dTV (2015–2023). In March 2016, it became the first domestic SVOD platform in Japan to surpass five million subscribers, holding the largest streaming market share in the country at 24.1%. However, this figure decreased to 4.2% by 2022.

In April 2023, Docomo completely revamped the service, rebranding it as Lemino and transitioning to a hybrid model. The updated platform offers both a premium subscription tier and a free ad-supported video-on-demand tier, which features catch-up distribution for domestic television programs from networks such as TV Tokyo and Yomiuri TV. From 2024, Docomo expanded Lemino's library to include live sports broadcasting (such as the NBA), live music concerts, and original dramas. In late 2025, the platform formed a content-sharing partnership with satellite broadcaster Wowow and introduced third-party add-on networks such as Paramount+ (which was subsequently discontinued). In October 2026, Wowow acquired a controlling interest in Lemino through a capital and business alliance. Following the acquisition, Lemino integrated Wowow's broadcast properties into its library, adding over 100 titles from the Continuous Drama W series and live sports content, including UEFA Champions League matches and tennis Grand Slam tournaments.

== History ==
=== Origins as BeeTV and Video Store ===
Following an initial announcement in October 2008, Avex and NTT Docomo launched BeeTV, a mobile-exclusive broadcasting station for Docomo users, on May 1, 2009. BeeTV was operated by Avex Broadcasting & Communications Inc., a joint venture established on April 10, 2009, with Avex holding a 70% stake and Docomo holding 30%. In March 2011, the service expanded to Android smartphones with a monthly subscription fee of ¥315.

On December 18, 2011, NTT Docomo launched an SVOD service called d Market Video Store powered by BeeTV (dマーケット VIDEOストア powered by BeeTV) within its online portal, d-market. The service was available exclusively to Docomo mobile users and cost ¥525 per month. In February 2012, a dedicated Android app was released for the service. The platform's subscriber base grew rapidly, surpassing 1 million on April 24, 2012, and reaching 4 million by March 19, 2013.

On January 30, 2013, the service was renamed d Video powered by BeeTV (dビデオ powered by BeeTV). Starting February 26, 2014, d Market services, including d-video, became available on devices from other mobile carriers.

=== Rebranding to dTV ===
On April 22, 2015, Avex and Docomo rebranded the service as dTV. As part of the overhaul, dTV introduced a "zapping" user interface: upon launching the app, a video would automatically start playing, and users could switch between vertically arranged channels by flicking on a smartphone or using a TV remote. This design aimed to improve content discovery by allowing users to watch programming without actively searching for it. Following the renewal, the service saw a significant decrease in cancellation rates and a rise in subscriptions. By March 27, 2016, dTV exceeded 5 million users, making it the largest SVOD service in Japan, significantly surpassing competitors such as KDDI's Video Pass (1 million), Avex and SoftBank's Uula (1.24 million), and Nippon TV's Hulu Japan (1 million). dTV added support for Chromecast in May 2015, Fire TV in March 2016, and Apple TV in June 2016.

The logo of the d-market Video Store from 2011 to 2013

The logo of the d-video from 2013 to 2015

The logo of the dTV from 2015 to 2023

On June 30, 2018, dTV released Punk Samurai Slash Down, a movie produced solely by the video streaming service. This marked the first time a Japanese movie produced by a streaming service was released in theaters. Originally planned as a streaming exclusive, the project was later given a nationwide theatrical release in 300 cinemas. However, it grossed only ¥300 million at the box office.

According to the market research firm GEM Partners, as of 2016, dTV had a domestic share of 24.1%, overwhelmingly ranking first. However, in 2017, the share decreased to 18.1%, in 2019 to 13.7%, and in 2022 to 4.2%.

In December 2021, Docomo announced that it would be changing the URL of dTV from video.dmkt-sp.jp to dtv.docomo.ne.jp. However, this change was not implemented until the renewal to Lemino.

For the fiscal year ending March 2022, dTV's operating company reported a significant decline in financial performance, with sales dropping 6.7% to ¥11.2 billion and operating profit plunging 70.1% to ¥460 million. Over a two-year period, sales had decreased by approximately 20% and operating profit by over 80%. In light of these challenges, Avex and Docomo dissolved their joint venture in January 2023. Avex sold its 70% stake to Docomo, making Docomo the sole owner of the service.

=== Transition to Lemino ===
On March 6, 2023, NTT Docomo announced that it would be replacing its dTV video streaming service with an ad-supported video on demand (AVOD) service called Lemino from April 12. Lemino will have two plans: a free, ad-supported plan and a premium plan called "Lemino Premium" for 990 yen per month. While dTV had a strong lineup of music content, Lemino has expanded its offerings to include original works, anime, and Korean dramas, resulting in a library of nearly 180,000 titles, which is slightly less than double its previous count. In an effort to reach a broader range of customers beyond Docomo's telecommunications subscribers, the Lemino brand dropped the "d" from its name, which was associated with Docomo.

During the March 6 press conference, Docomo executive officer Tomo Kobayashi noted that intense market competition and a reliance on low pricing had diminished the service's presence, prompting the overhaul. The rebranding occurred during a period of consolidation among domestic streaming platforms, following the closure of Yahoo! Japan's Gyao! and the merger of U-Next and Paravi.

On April 24, 2023, Docomo announced a business alliance with the entertainment conglomerate Yoshimoto Kogyo. On May 1, they established a joint venture, NTT Docomo Studio & Live, to produce programs, manage idol groups, and organize live concerts. The venture's programming is distributed on Lemino, with plans for international expansion.

=== Strategic expansion ===
In 2024, facing a maturing mobile market and declining profits in its core telecommunications business, parent company NTT Docomo repositioned Lemino as a critical tool for retaining its customer base. Tasked with competing against foreign tech giants in a highly competitive red ocean streaming market, Lemino began an aggressive expansion of its content, starting with the free streaming of the J.League Cup. To increase user engagement, Lemino introduced ad-supported free catch-up distribution for domestic television programs, beginning with TV Tokyo dramas in July 2024, and later expanding to include Osaka-based Yomiuri TV variety shows in December 2024. To further diversify its offerings, the platform launched the Lemino Channel feature in October 2024, allowing users to subscribe to specialized third-party networks a la carte. This initiative saw a major expansion on April 18, 2025, when Paramount+ was integrated into the lineup, bringing Hollywood films, original series, and children's programming to the service. However, this addition was short-lived; in February 2026, Docomo announced that the Paramount+ channel would be discontinued on March 31, 2026, following Paramount's withdrawal from the Japanese market across all domestic streaming platforms.

To rapidly scale Lemino's presence, Docomo initially pursued a grand alliance of domestic streaming platforms in mid-2025. The ambitious plan involved Docomo acquiring a major stake in the premium satellite broadcaster Wowow and integrating the streaming services of major commercial networks like Fuji Media Holdings and Nippon TV. However, due to legal complexities regarding telecommunications companies investing in broadcasters and internal doubts about the strategy, this capital alliance was abandoned by October 2025.

Following this setback, the strategy for Lemino pivoted from platform integration to robust content acquisition. On November 4, 2025, a strategic content partnership with Wowowwas formally announced. This arrangement allowed for mutual content sharing, which had already begun to materialize in October 2025 when Lemino added UEFA Champions League matches (sub-licensed from Wowow) to its Premium tier. Concurrently in October, Lemino capitalized on the end of Rakuten's exclusive domestic rights to secure a multi-year streaming deal for NBA games. This NBA acquisition was strategically aligned with Amazon's global rights and aimed at capturing a younger demographic fueled.

This strategic shift resulted in a massive influx of exclusive content for Lemino in early 2026. Through the Wowow partnership, the platform began streaming major live concerts and launched the co-produced historical epic drama Suikoden by Kenzo Kitakata, starring Yuji Oda, on February 15, 2026. In the same month, however, Docomo announced that the Paramount+ channel would be discontinued on March 31, 2026, following Paramount's withdrawal from the Japanese market across all domestic streaming platforms.

Independent of Wowow, Lemino aggressively acquired music and entertainment content. This included 28 BTS-related titles and scheduled live broadcasts of major concerts, such as NCT Wish, SMTOWN LIVE 2025–26 in Fukuoka, and Babymetal's UK and Europe Arena Tour 2025. The platform also secured the global distribution rights for Produce 101 Japan: Shin Sekai, a survival audition program, and expanded its variety programming featuring Japanese idol groups from the Sakamichi Series.

The service also significantly expanded its original drama and sports lineups. Lemino launched a Japanese remake of the South Korean series Hot Stove League starring, and a fantasy drama featuring members of Sakurazaka46. Furthermore, the platform announced late-2026 projects, including the Takayuki Yamada-produced audition show The Open Call, the sci-fi legal suspense drama Tsumi to Koi, and an exclusive documentary following boxer Naoya Inoue.

Simultaneously, Lemino began targeting the ASEAN market to expand the overseas reach of Japanese media. Supported by a Ministry of Internal Affairs and Communications demonstration project, Docomo partnered with TrueVisions Now, Thailand's leading OTT platform, to establish the Lemino Japanese Collection. Launched on March 25, 2026, this initiative distributed packaged live-action Japanese broadcast content—initially offering 125 titles and 402 episodes—sourced from a coalition of 76 regional and national broadcasters and production companies, including NHK, Wowow, the five Tokyo key commercial networks, and the five Osaka sub-key commercial networks.

=== Acquisition by Wowow ===
Under its new ownership, Lemino integrated over 100 titles from Wowow's original Continuous Drama W series into its library. Furthermore, major live sports properties to which Wowow holds the broadcast rights, including all UEFA Champions League and Europa League matches, alongside major tennis tournaments such as the Japan Open and the Grand Slams, are now available to stream on Lemino.

=== Acquisition by Wowow ===
Lemino underwent a major corporate transition following a capital and business alliance between Docomo and Wowow on June 15, 2026. The streaming platform was effectively acquired by the premium satellite broadcaster, and its operations were officially transferred to a new joint venture, Wowow Lemino Inc., on October 1, 2026. Through this arrangement, Lemino became a consolidated subsidiary of Wowow, which holds a 51 percent controlling stake, while Docomo retains a 49 percent minority share. Operating under new management, Lemino's executive board was restructured to be largely led by Wowow personnel, with Satoshi Suzuki appointed as President and Tomonori Tanaka as Vice President. To maintain continuity for its existing user base, Lemino retained its brand name and its standard monthly subscription price of 1,540 yen. Leveraging Wowow's content production capabilities and Docomo's extensive customer base, the new management aims to build one of Japan's largest entertainment platforms, setting an early target of surpassing five million subscribers.

Under its new ownership, Lemino integrated over 100 titles from Wowow's original Continuous Drama W series into its library. Furthermore, major live sports properties to which Wowow holds the broadcast rights, including all UEFA Champions League and Europa League matches, alongside major tennis tournaments such as the Japan Open and the Grand Slams, are now available to stream on Lemino.

== Content ==
Lemino's library includes approximately 180,000 titles, featuring original productions, anime, South Korean dramas, music concerts, domestic television catch-up services, and sports broadcasts. Its offerings were significantly bolstered in late 2025 through a strategic content-sharing partnership with premium satellite broadcaster Wowow, and further expanded in October 2026 following Wowow's acquisition of a controlling stake in the platform. The service also offers à la carte add-on subscriptions through its Lemino Channel feature, while leveraging live sports and music events to attract new subscribers and drama series to retain them.

=== Original programming and dramas ===
The platform produces and distributes original films and series. During its dTV era, it produced the film Punk Samurai Slash Down (2018), which became the first Japanese streaming-produced film to receive a nationwide theatrical release. In early 2026, Lemino expanded its drama offerings with an adaptation of Kenzo Kitakata's Suikoden starring Yuji Oda, which was co-produced with Wowow. Following the launch of the joint venture with Wowow in October 2026, Lemino integrated over 100 archival and recent titles from Wowow's original Continuous Drama W series into its library. Other high-profile exclusive series include a Japanese remake of the South Korean series Hot Stove League starring Kazuya Kamenashi, and a fantasy series featuring members of Sakurazaka46. The platform's original projects also include the sci-fi legal suspense drama Tsumi to Koi starring Mizuki Yamamoto and the actor audition program The Open Call produced by Takayuki Yamada.

=== Music and live entertainment ===
Lemino has a strong focus on music and idol content, distributing live concerts and exclusive programs featuring domestic and international artists. Through its integration with Wowow, Lemino streams major concerts from artists such as Dreams Come True, Misia, Be First, and Super Beaver. Independently, the platform secured exclusive streaming rights to 28 titles featuring BTS, and broadcast major live events including NCT Wish, SM Town Live 2025–26 in Fukuoka, and Babymetal's UK and Europe Arena Tour 2025. In 2026, Lemino secured the global distribution rights for the survival audition program Produce 101 Japan Shinsekai, hosted by Dean Fujioka. The service also streams variety programs featuring idol groups from the Sakamichi Series. Additionally, through NTT Docomo Studio & Live—a joint venture with Yoshimoto Kogyo established in 2023—the platform produces idol-focused programs and concert events.

=== Sports ===
Lemino has steadily expanded its live sports broadcasting portfolio. In 2024, the platform began offering free replays of all J.League Cup matches. In October 2025, Lemino secured a multi-year streaming deal for NBA games—taking over the domestic rights previously held by Rakuten—aimed at capturing a growing fanbase driven by Japanese players. During the same month, the platform initially added UEFA Champions League matches for the 2025–26 season to its Premium tier through its content-sharing agreement with Wowow. Following the October 2026 corporate restructuring under Wowow Lemino Inc., the platform expanded its sports lineup to include live broadcasts of all UEFA Champions League and Europa League matches, alongside rugby and major tennis tournaments such as the Japan Open and the Grand Slams. It also features combat sports content, including live boxing events and exclusive documentaries following Japanese boxer Naoya Inoue.

=== Third-party channels ===
In October 2024, the platform launched Lemino Channel, a feature allowing users to subscribe to specialized third-party networks à la carte, independent of the base Lemino Premium subscription. On April 18, 2025, the service added Paramount+ to its channel lineup, expanding Lemino's library with Hollywood films from Paramount Pictures, original series such as Tulsa King, and children's programming like PAW Patrol. However, due to the rights holder's circumstances, Paramount+ ceased operations in Japan, resulting in its removal from Lemino's channel offerings on March 31, 2026.

== Service and availability ==
Lemino operates as a hybrid streaming service, offering a free ad-supported video-on-demand (AVOD) tier that includes catch-up distribution for domestic television programs, such as TV Tokyo dramas and Yomiuri Telecasting Corporation variety shows, and a premium subscription video-on-demand (SVOD) tier called "Lemino Premium", priced at ¥990 per month. The premium tier is also integrated into NTT Docomo's Docomo Max and Docomo Poi-katsu Max mobile plans, allowing subscribers to select Lemino as a free perk, which includes additional benefits such as early access to concert tickets.

Initially launched in 2011 as a mobile-exclusive service for Docomo users, the platform was opened to subscribers of other mobile carriers in February 2014. The service supports various viewing platforms; it introduced a "zapping" user interface for smartphones in 2015 to improve content discovery, and subsequently added television support via Chromecast (May 2015), Fire TV (March 2016), and Apple TV (June 2016).

In March 2026, Lemino began its international expansion by launching the Lemino Japanese Collection on TrueVisions Now, an OTT platform in Thailand. Supported by a Ministry of Internal Affairs and Communications demonstration project, the collection distributes packaged live-action Japanese broadcast content sourced from 76 domestic partners, including NHK, Wowow, the five Tokyo key commercial networks, and the five Osaka sub-key commercial networks.

== See also ==
- D Anime Store
