= Addiction (Sakurazaka46 album) =

- Complete edition cover

Studio album by Sakurazaka46
- Released: April 30, 2025
- Genre: J-pop
- Length: 75:48
- Language: Japanese
- Label: Sony Music
- Producer: Yasushi Akimoto

Sakurazaka46 chronology
As You Know? (2022)	Addiction (2025)

Singles from Addiction
- 1. "Sakurazuki" Released: February 15, 2023; 2. "Start Over!" Released: June 28, 2023; 3. "Shōninyokkyū" Released: October 18, 2023; 4. "Ikutsu no Koro ni Modoritai no ka?" Released: February 21, 2024; 5. "Jigōjitoku" Released: June 26, 2024; 6. "I Want Tomorrow to Come" Released: October 23, 2024; 7. "Udagawa Generation" Released: February 19, 2025

Addiction is the second studio album by Japanese girl group Sakurazaka46. It was released through Sony Music Records on April 30, 2025, about three years after its predecessor As You Know? (2022). Seven singles preceded the album: "Sakurazuki", "Start Over!", "Shōninyokkyū", "Ikutsu no Koro ni Modoritai no ka?", "Jigōjitoku", "I Want Tomorrow to Come", and "Udagawa Generation". Commercially, Addiction topped the Oricon Albums Chart and reached number two on the Billboard Japan Hot Albums chart.

== Background and release ==
On January 9, 2025, following the mini live event to commemorate their tenth single "I Want Tomorrow to Come", Sakurazaka46 announced their then-untitled second studio album, alongside the group's eleventh single "Udagawa Generation", to be released in February, and the fifth national concert tour in support of the album from April to August via teaser video collecting music videos of their previous ten singles. On February 21, the group unveiled the album title Addiction and its release date April 30, coming in three physical editions: limited type-A and B and standard. The limited editions' Blu-ray would include the full footages from their fourth concert tour Shin Sakura Zensen: Go on Back? at Tokyo Dome on type-A and the tour's documentary on type-B.

The album's cover artworks for each edition and its teaser video were revealed on March 25. Naoya Kudō, Mai Shibatani, and Shō Tsujioka handle the art and creative direction. It shows the concept of "a bouquet of emotions", which "delicately shining" flowers represent the various emotions that bloom from within each member like "the blood flowing through the body", comparing to Sakurazaka46's journey to date.

== Promotion ==
Sakurazaka46 members appeared on Weekly Shōnen Magazine in the cover, front, center gravure, and back pages for three consecutive issues from 16th to 18th issues of 2025. On April 7, the group uploaded the performance of "Shōninyokkyū" from the Shin Sakura Zensen: Go on Back? tour, which included on the type-A Blu-ray of the album. Addiction's track list was revealed on April 11, including seven previous singles and their B-side, one new track, and seven newly-written "interludes". The bonus tracks are the remix version of the group's songs by Nurko, Ninajirachi, Raiden, Devin, Naeleck, and Tsar.

Two promotional singles were supported the album: the Ninajirachi remix of "Shōninyokkyū" and the title track "Addiction", released April 11 and 18, respectively. The music video for the title track premiered on April 27; Karin Fujiyoshi and Ten Yamasaki served as the song's choreographic double center. Directed by Hidejin Katō, the visual shows all members wearing student uniform and performing canon dance (the same movement but different time). In the last chorus, Fujiyoshi and Yamasaki dance while being hit by rain and cherry blossoms falling. The group debuted the performance of the title track at CDTV Live! Live! on April 28.

== Critical reception ==
Writing for Real Sound, Azusa Ogiwara praised Addiction for reconstruction and reinterpretation of the songs through track order and rearrangement, unlike previous albums, which is just a collection of previously released songs. He noted that the album "shows an emphasis on the quality of the work, with a strong awareness of the purpose of the album format," and complimented the connections between the songs, their flow, and their arrangement, highlighting the transition of "I Want Tomorrow to Come" and "Start Over!" that shows the protagonist's emotional change; the connection of "Tokyo Snow" and "Udagawa Generation" which both songs named after places; and "Abura o Sase!" and "Jigōjitoku" that makes a "sound-like exaltation".

== Commercial performance ==
Addiction debuted at number one on the Oricon Albums Chart, the second number one on the chart since following As You Know?. It has sold 173,392 physical copies in its first week. The album also topped the Digital Albums and Combined Albums Charts. For Billboard Japan, the album entered the Hot Albums at number two, blocked by Snow Man's The Best 2020–2025. It earned 192,244 physical copies and 1,159 digital sales, topped both Top Albums Sales and Download Albums, while the streaming numbers were the 45th of the week.

== Track listing ==
All lyrics are written by Yasushi Akimoto, except interludes.

Addiction track listing
No.	Title	Music	Arrangement	Length
1.	"Interlude #1"	TomoLow	TomoLow	0:42
2.	"Shōninyokkyū" (承認欲求)	Kenta Urashima; Yūki Katō	Katō	3:21
3.	"Interlude #2"	TomoLow	TomoLow	0:33
4.	"Ikutsu no Koro ni Modoritai no ka?" (何歳の頃に戻りたいのか?)	Nazca	Apazzi	3:58
5.	"Cool"	Chocolate Mix	Chocolate Mix	4:17
6.	"I Want Tomorrow to Come"	Nazca	Mellow	4:14
7.	"Interlude #3"	TomoLow	TomoLow	1:11
8.	"Start Over!"	Nazca	Mellow	4:18
9.	"Isshun no Uma" (一瞬の馬)	Kensuke Kawahara	Kawahara	3:12
10.	"Interlude #4"	TomoLow	TomoLow	1:25
11.	"Sakurazuki" (桜月)	Nazca	The Third	4:42
12.	"Natsu no Chikamichi" (夏の近道)	Tomonori Inoue	Apazzi	5:08
13.	"Bokutachi no La Vie en rose" (僕たちの La vie en rose)	Daisuke Nakamura; TomoLow	Nakamura; TomoLow	4:03
14.	"Tokyo Snow"	Yūichirō Tsuru	Tsuru	4:45
15.	"Interlude #5"	TomoLow	TomoLow	1:01
16.	"Udagawa Generation"	Satori Shiraishi	Apazzi	3:45
17.	"Mō Ikkyoku Hoshii no kai?" (もう一曲 欲しいのかい?)	Yūki Tsujimura; Naoki Itai	Tsujimura; Itai	3:09
18.	"Nando Love Song no Kashi o Yomikaeshita Darō" (何度 LOVE SONGの歌詞を読み返しただろう)	Atsushi	TomoLow	4:14
19.	"Abura o Sase!" (油を注せ!)	Tsujimura; Ken Itō	Tsujimura; Itō	3:12
20.	"Interlude #6"	TomoLow	TomoLow	0:41
21.	"Jigōjitoku" (自業自得)	Nakamura	Nakamura	4:01
22.	"Interlude #7"	TomoLow	TomoLow	1:13
23.	"Seijiyaku no Bōryoku" (静寂の暴力)	Tsujimura; Itō	Tsujimura; Itō	4:06
24.	"Addiction"	Urashima; Taishi Noguchi	Apazzi	4:25
Total length:				75:48

Addiction – complete and limited editions bonus track (Sakurazaka46 Remixes)
No.	Title	Length
1.	"Seijiyaku no Bōryoku" (Nurko remix)	3:26
2.	"Shōninyokkyū" (Ninajirachi remix)	2:56
3.	"Ikutsu no Koro ni Modoritai no ka?" (Raiden remix)	2:42
4.	"Jigōjitoku" (Devin remix)	1:56
5.	"I Want Tomorrow to Come" (Naeleck remix)	2:40
6.	"Udagawa Generation" (Naeleck remix)	2:48
Total length:		92:04

Addiction limited type-A (Blu-ray) – Sakurazaka46 4th Arena Tour 2024 Shin Sakura Zensen: Go on Back? at Tokyo Dome
No.	Title	Length
1.	"Overture"
2.	"Ikutsu no Koro ni Modoritai no ka?"
3.	"Nakasete Hold Me Tight" (泣かせて Hold me tight!)
4.	"Koi ga Zetsumetsu Suru Hi" (恋が絶滅する日)
5.	"Masatsukeisu" (摩擦係数)
6.	"Nobody's Fault"
7.	"Cool"
8.	"Dead End"
9.	"Sakurazuki"
10.	"Nagaredama" (流れ弾)
11.	"Nando Love Song no Kashi o Yomikaeshita Darō"
12.	"Koi wa Muitenai" (恋は向いてない)
13.	"Manatsu ni Nani ka Okiru no Kashira" (真夏に何か起きるのかしら)
14.	"Kokoro no Kagee" (心の影絵)
15.	"Abura o Sase!"
16.	"Seijiyaku no Bōryoku"
17.	"Manhole no Futa no Ue" (マンホールの蓋の上)
18.	"Ban"
19.	"Shōninyokkyū"
20.	"Start Over!"
21.	"Jigōjitoku"
22.	"Medley Anthem Time / Drone Senkaichū" (メドレー Anthem time / ドローン旋回中)
23.	"Buddies"
24.	"Sakurazaka no Uta" (櫻坂の詩)
Total length:		248:18

Addiction limited type-B (Blu-ray)
No.	Title	Length
1.	"The Documentary of Tour 2024 Shin Sakura Zensen: Go on Back?" (The Documentary of TOUR 2024 新・櫻前線 -Go on back?-)
Total length:		222:48

== Charts ==
=== Weekly charts ===
Weekly chart performance for Addiction
Chart (2025)	Peak position
Japanese Albums (Oricon)	1
Japanese Combined Albums (Oricon)	1
Japanese Hot Albums (Billboard Japan)	2

=== Monthly charts ===
Monthly chart performance for Addiction
Chart (2025)	Position
Japanese Albums (Oricon)	1

=== Year-end charts ===
Year-end chart performance for Addiction
Chart (2025)	Position
Japanese Albums (Oricon)	33
Japanese Top Albums Sales (Billboard Japan)	33

== Certifications ==
Certifications for Addiction
Region	Certification	Certified units/sales
Japan (RIAJ) Physical	Gold	100,000^{^}
^{^} Shipments figures based on certification alone.

== Release history ==
Release dates and formats for Addiction
Region	Date	Format	Version	Label	Ref.
Various	April 30, 2025	Digital download; streaming	Complete	Sony Music	
Japan	April 30, 2025	CD; CD+Blu-ray	Standard; limited type-A; limited type-B	Sony Music	
