= Sakura Endō =

Japanese singer, actress, and model (born 2001)

- 遠藤 さくら
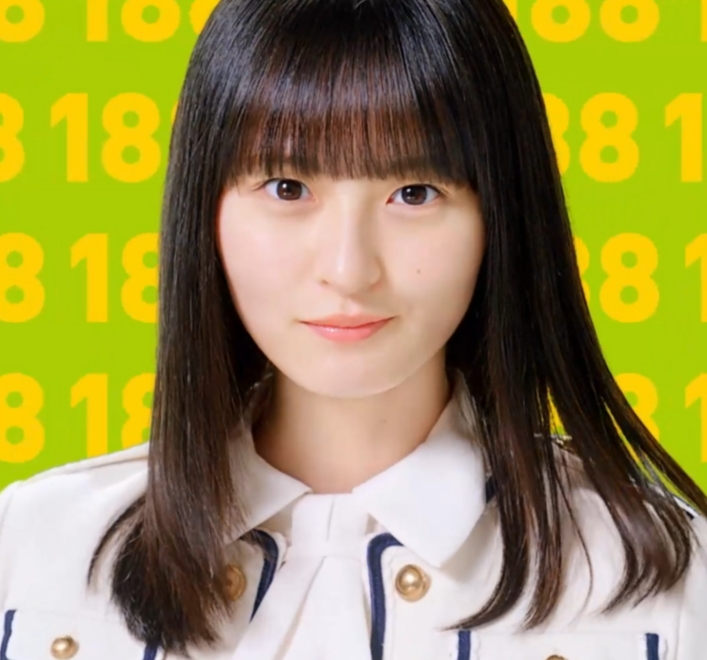
- Endō in April 2025
- Born: 3 October 2001 (age 24); Nagoya, Aichi, Japan
- Other names: Sakuchan (さくちゃん); Enpii (えんぴー)
- Occupations: Singer; actress; model
- Agent: Nogizaka46.LLC
- Musical career
- Origin: Tokyo, Japan
- Genres: J-pop
- Occupations: Vocals; clarinet
- Years active: 2018–present
- Label: Sony Records/N46Div
- Member of: Nogizaka46

Signature
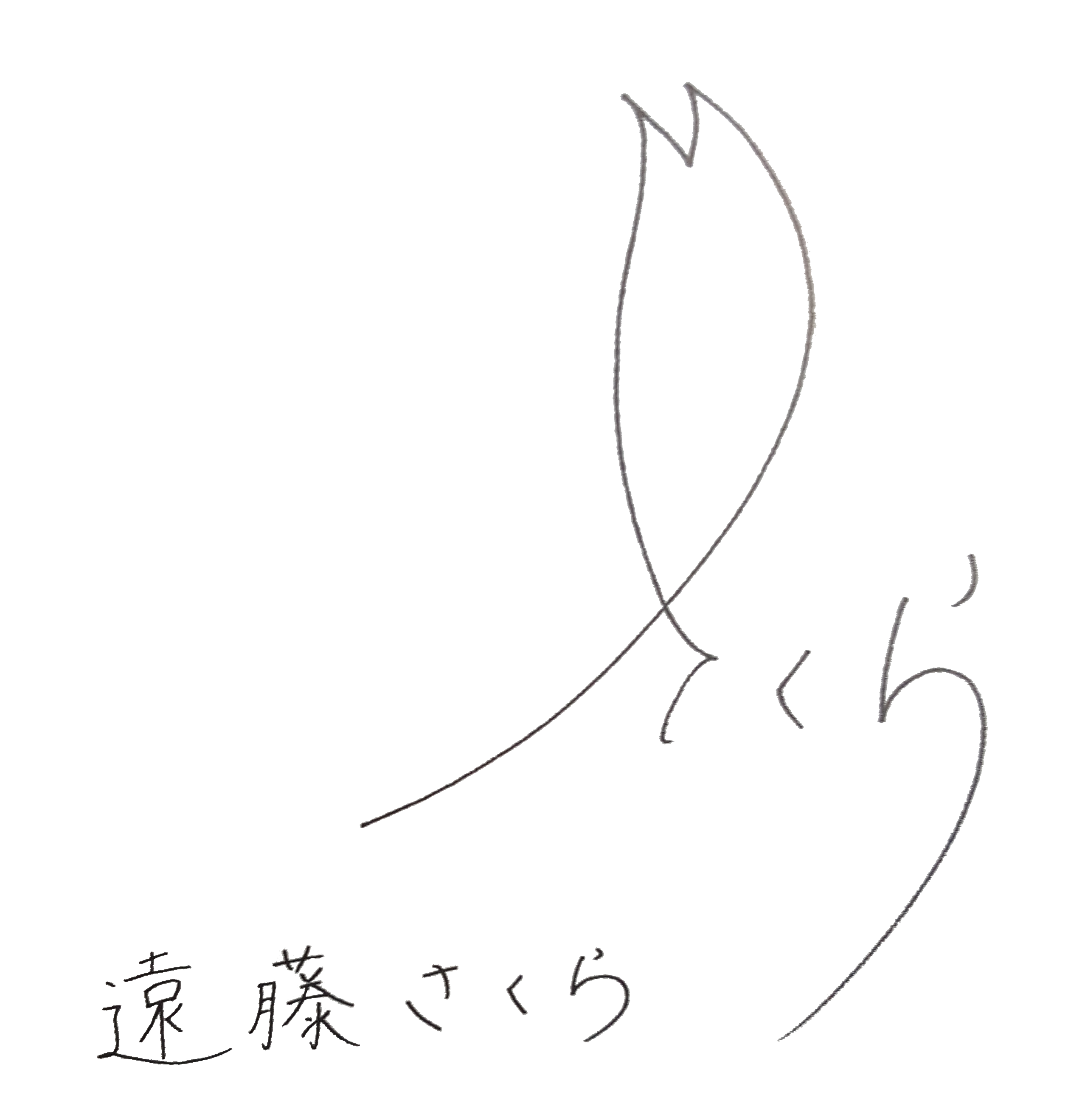

Sakura Endō (遠藤 さくら, Endō Sakura; born 3 October 2001) is a Japanese singer, actress, and model. She is a fourth generation member of the idol girl group Nogizaka46.

== Biography ==
Sakura Endō was born on 3 October 2001, in Nagoya City, Aichi Prefecture. Her family consists of her mother, father, and an older brother. Her parents run a chain of soba restaurants in Nagoya.

== Career ==
On August 19, 2018, Endo passed the Sakamichi Joint New Member Audition. She has stated that she applied for the audition because she wanted to change her shy personality and thought that just having the courage to audition for the girl group might change her demeanour for the better. On November 30, her profile was posted on the official website. On December 3 of the same year, she was introduced as a 4th generation member of Nogizaka46 at the "Nogizaka46 4th Generation Introduction" event held at the Nippon Budokan.

She served as the center for the 4th generation song "4th Light," which was included in the 23rd single "Sing Out!" released on May 29, 2019. On July 15, Endo was selected for the first time to perform live for the 24th single "Yoake Made Tsuyogaranakutemoii" as the center for the title track.

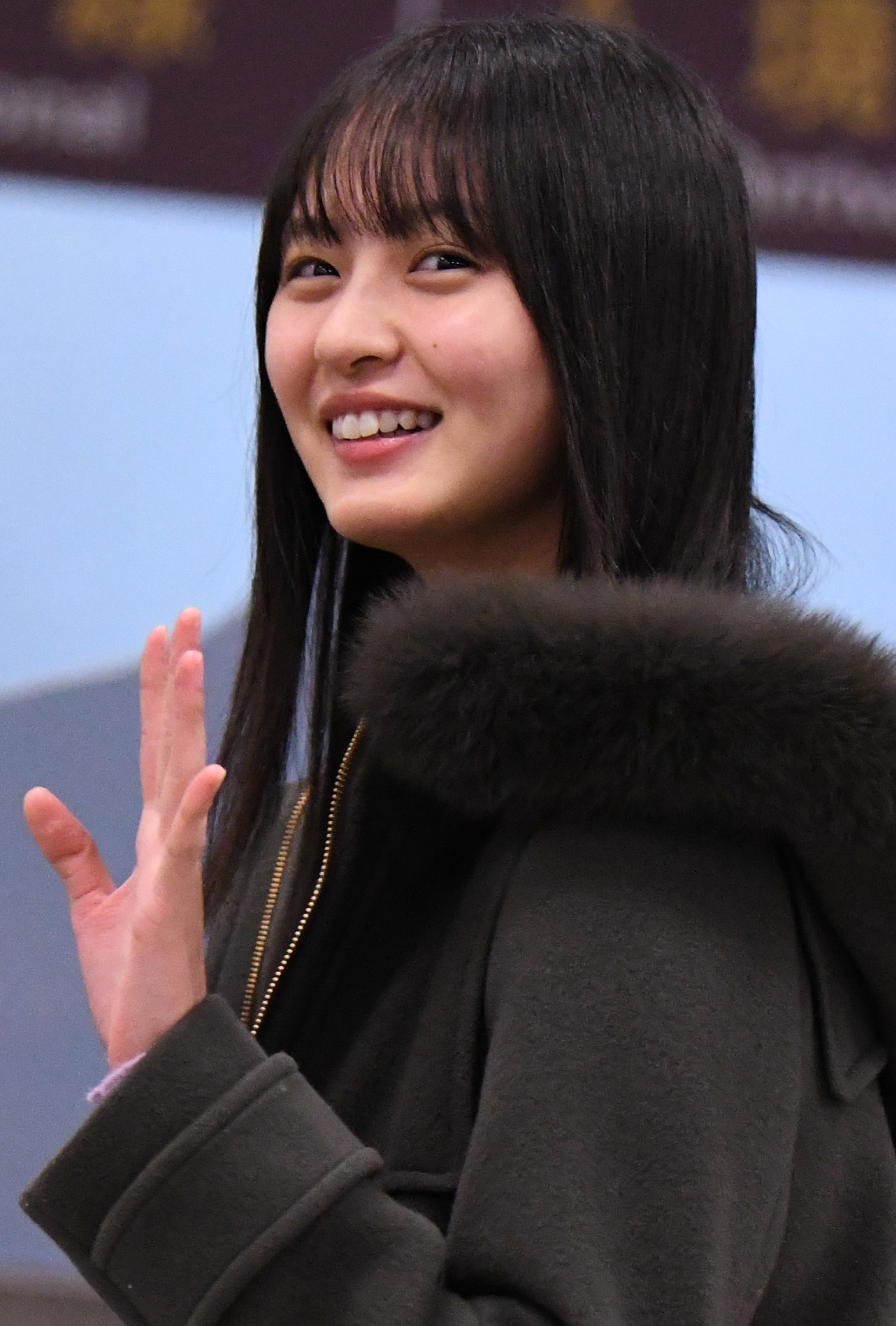
Endo in Taipei airport in 2020

On May 12, 2020, the teen fashion magazine Non-no announced that Endo had become one of their exclusive models. She made her debut appearance in the July/August combined issue, released on May 20.

She took on the center position for the second time for three singles in the 27th single "Gomen ne Fingers Crossed", released on June 9, 2021.

In January 2022, she made her first appearance in a television drama as the protagonist in What If There Was a High School Full of Ikemen? on TV Asahi. On October 20 of the same year, she landed her first solo cover of the December issue of Non-no magazine.

On August 23, 2023, it was announced that she has been cast in the Asadora drama series Ranman as Chitose Makino/Chitose Yamamoto. On October 3, her 22nd birthday, she released her first photobook intitled "Karen" published by Shueisha. On December 6 of the same year, she served as a double center with fellow member Haruka Kaki for the 34th single, "Monopoly".

Endo served as the center for the fourth time in three singles with the 37th single "Hodōkyō", which was released on December 11, 2024.

== Filmography ==
=== Television ===
| Year | Title | Role | Notes | Ref(s) |
|---|---|---|---|---|
| 2020 | Sam no Koto | Sam | Lead role | |
| 2021 | Borderless | Yuki Matsumiya | | |
| 2022 | What If There Were A High School for Handsome Boys Only? | Kanna Sakurai | Lead role | |
| 2023 | Truck Girl | Jun Kurate | Lead role | |
| 2023 | Ranman | Chitose Makino | Asadora | |
| 2024 | Moving Detective Sakura | Sakura Tendo | Lead role; mini-series | |
| 2024 | Bookstore Employee Detective Sakura | Sakura Tendo | Lead role; mini-series | |
| 2025 | Truck Girl 2 | Jun Kurate | Lead role | |

=== Other appearances ===
| Year | Title | Network | Role | Notes | Ref(s) |
|---|---|---|---|---|---|
| 2019 | Fantasaka Gakuen and Big Chorus Plan | Abema | Juniors | | |
| 2021 | Kikkake | The First Take | Herself | Cover song of Nogizaka46's song | |
| 2021 | —N/a | —N/a | Herself | Non-no 50th Thanks Party | |
| 2022 | Youth in 2 minutes and 30 seconds! | NHK | Narrator | 2022 Cheerleading Japan Championship | |

=== Commercials ===
Consumer Affairs Agency "Hotline 188" PSA

- AC Japan / NHK Joint Campaign 2019 Life of Living Things (2019, Media Maneuver)
- Walt Disney Japan Disney JCB Card
  - Tokyo DisneySea 20th Anniversary Card (2 February 2022)
  - You're my buddy (11 November 2022), co-starring with Rei Seimiya
- Consumer Affairs Agency Hotline 188 public service announcement (2025)

=== Music video appearances ===
Non Nogizaka46 related

- Little Glee Monster (Cover MV 9 March 2022)

== Events ==
- Tokyo Girls Collection
  - Tokyo Girls Collection Prestige International presents TGC TOYAMA 2019 (7 July 2019, Toyama City General Gymnasium)
  - 31st Mynavi Tokyo Girls Collection 2020 AUTUMN/WINTER ONLINE (9 September 2020, Saitama Super Arena)
  - 32nd Mynavi Tokyo Girls Collection 2021 SPRING/SUMMER (28 February 2021, online)
  - 33rd Mynavi Tokyo Girls Collection 2021 AUTUMN/WINTER (4 September 2021, online)
  - 34th Mynavi Tokyo Girls Collection 2022 SPRING/SUMMER (3 March 2022, Yoyogi National Stadium First Gymnasium)
  - 35th Mynavi Tokyo Girls Collection 2022 AUTUMN/WINTER (3 September 2022, Saitama Super Arena)
  - TGC KITAKYUSHU 2022 by TOKYO GIRLS COLLECTION (19 November 2022, West Japan General Exhibition Hall New Building)
  - SDGs Promotion TGC Shizuoka 2023 by TOKYO GIRLS COLLECTION (14 January 2023, Twin Messe Shizuoka)
  - The 36th Mynavi Tokyo Girls Collection 2023 SPRING/SUMMER (4 March 2023, Yoyogi National Stadium First Gymnasium)
- Rakuten Girls Award
  - Rakuten Girls Award 2022 AUTUMN/WINTER (8 October 2022, Makuhari Messe 9-11 Hall)
  - Rakuten Girls Award 2023 SPRING/SUMMER (4 May 2023, Yoyogi National Stadium First Gymnasium)

== Bibliography ==
=== Magazine ===
- Non-no (5 May 2020, Shueisha) Exclusive model
- B.L.T. [Cover & Poster] (October 2022 Issue)
- The NEW ERA Book Fall & Winter 2022 (10 October 2022, Shinko Music)
