= Tetsuya Honda =

Japanese novelist (born 1969)

- Born: August 18, 1969 (age 57); Tokyo, Japan
- Occupation: Writer
- Writing career
- Language: Japanese
- Period: 2003–present
- Genres: Mystery, thriller
- Notable work: Lieutenant Himekawa series

Tetsuya Honda (誉田 哲也, Honda Tetsuya; born August 18, 1969) is a Japanese writer of mystery and thriller novels and one of Japan's bestselling authors. He is a member of the Mystery Writers of Japan and has won many prestigious awards. Several of his popular Reiko Himekawa crime novels have been translated into English, German, Polish, Chinese, Persian, Thai and Vietnamese. In Japan, several of Honda's works have been adapted into major theatrical motion pictures and TV dramas, including Strawberry Night and Strawberry Night Saga.

== Works in translation ==
Lieutenant Himekawa series

- The Silent Dead (original title: Strawberry Night), trans. Giles Murray (Minotaur Books, 2016; Titan Books, 2016)
- Blutroter Tod, trans. Irmengard Gabler (S. Fischer Verlag, 2016)
- Przeczucie, (original title: Strawberry Night), trans. Rafał Śmietana (Społeczny Instytut Wydawniczy Znak, 2017)
- Soul Cage (Minotaur Books, 2017)
- Stahlblaue Nacht (original title: Soul Cage), trans. Irmengard Gabler (S. Fischer Verlag, 2017)
- Rouge est la nuit (original title: Strawberry Night), trans. Dominique Sylvain and Frank Sylvain (Atelier Akatombo, France, 2019)

== Main works ==
=== Lieutenant Himekawa series ===
- Novels
  - Strawberry Night (ストロベリーナイト), 2006 (The Silent Dead, Minotaur, 2016), (Rouge est la nuit, Akatombo, 2019)
  - Soul Cage (ソウルケイジ), 2007 (Soul Cage, Minotaur, 2017)
  - Invisible Rain (インビジブルレイン), 2009
  - Blue Murder (ブルーマーダー), 2012
  - Glass Sun ― Rouge (硝子の太陽 ルージュ), 2016
- Short story collections
  - Symmetry (シンメトリー), 2008
  - Index (インデックス), 2014
- Spin-off novel
  - Kansen Yugi (感染遊戯), 2011 (Infection Game)

=== Jiu trilogy ===
- Novels
1. Jiu I: Keishicho Tokushu Hanzai Sosa-gakari (ジウI 警視庁特殊犯捜査係), 2005
2. Jiu II: Keishicho Tokushu Kyushu Butai (ジウII 警視庁特殊急襲部隊), 2006
3. Jiu III: Shin Sekai Chitsujo (ジウIII 新世界秩序), 2006
- Spin-off novels
  - Kokkyo Jihen (国境事変), 2007
  - Hang (ハング), 2009
  - Kabukicho Seven (歌舞伎町セブン), 2010
  - Kabukicho Damned (歌舞伎町ダムド), 2014
  - Glass Sun ― Noir (硝子の太陽 ノワール), 2016

=== Bushido series ===
1. Bushido Sixteen (武士道シックスティーン), 2007
2. Bushido Seventeen (武士道セブンティーン), 2008
3. Bushido Eighteen (武士道エイティーン), 2009
4. Bushido Generation (武士道ジェネレーション), 2015

== See also ==
- Japanese detective fiction
