= Thinking Dogs =

Japanese rock band

- Genre: Rock
- Years active: 2014–2024
- Label: Sony
- Members: Tsubasa (vocals); Wachu (bass); Jun (guitar); Daiki (drums)
- Website: Official website

Thinking Dogs were a Japanese rock band formed in 2014. They made their major-label debut with Sony Music Entertainment Japan in June 2015 with the single "Sekai wa Owaranai" (世界は終わらない), which served as the theme song of the television drama Yamegoku: Yakuza Yamete Itadakimasu, starring Yuko Oshima; all three songs on the debut single had lyrics by Yasushi Akimoto. Their third single, "Sonna Kimi, Konna Boku", was used as an ending theme in season 20 of Naruto: Shippuden, while "Ienakatta Koto" served as the theme song of the 2018 Japanese remake of You Are the Apple of My Eye, starring Asuka Saitō.

While the band's music were initially written by outside songwriters, including Akimoto, by the 2020s, the members have created the lyrics and composition on much of their material. Thinking Dogs have released multiple singles and digital releases, including the 2023 album FAQ. They disbanded on June 22, 2024, following a final concert at the Shindaita Fever in Setagaya, Tokyo.
