= Soko Magattara, Sakurazaka? =

Japanese weekly variety show

- Title card

Japanese name
- Kanji: そこ曲がったら、櫻坂?
- Literal meaning: If You Turn There, is it Sakurazaka?
- Genre: Variety show
- Created by: Yasushi Akimoto
- Presented by: Yū Sawabe; Teruyuki Tsuchida
- Starring: Sakurazaka46
- Narrated by: Umeka Shōji
- Country of origin: Japan
- Original language: Japanese
- No. of episodes: 171

Production
- Producers: Yoshio Konno; Hiroaki Sano; Makoto Nagao
- Running time: 30 min.

Original release
- Network: TV Tokyo
- Release: October 18, 2020

Related
- Keyakitte, Kakenai?; Where is Nogizaka?; Nogizaka Under Construction; Hiragana Oshi; Hinatazaka de Aimashō

Soko Magattara, Sakurazaka? (そこ曲がったら、櫻坂?; "If You Turn There, is it Sakurazaka?") is a Japanese late night variety show starring Japanese idol group Sakurazaka46. It is hosted by Yū Sawabe and Teruyuki Tsuchida and airs every Sunday at 12:35 AM JST on TV Tokyo. It is the direct continuation of Keyakitte, Kakenai?, which had the same cast, format, and time slot, but named after the former name of Sakurazaka46, Keyakizaka46.

The show is also often referred to as Soko Saku (そこさく), which is a shortened version of the original title. This shorter name is also used as part of the name for an original content series on VR SQUARE called "Soko Saku VR" and another feature available on GYAO! called "Soko Saku Daihyakkajiten" (そこさく大百科事典, "Soko Saku Encyclopedia").

== History ==
The idol group Keyakizaka46 was rebranded into Sakurazaka46 on October 14, 2020, and it was announced in the Keyakitte, Kakenai? broadcast on October 11 that the show would also be renewed with a new title. The new show aired on October 19 without the title card in the beginning, and the new title was announced in the middle of the show. The title references the fact that the real Keyakizaka and Sakurazaka streets in Roppongi, Tokyo, are connected. Despite being a variety show, like Keyakitte, Kakenai?, this show is also used as a platform for various announcements regarding the group or the members, including the announcement of various Sakurazaka46 single selections.

From April 5, 2021, an exclusive broadcast catch-up service began to be available on GYAO! every Monday after the live television broadcast. This service provides a delayed on-demand streaming solution for fans or potential audiences who missed the live television broadcast. On GYAO!, a special edition of "Soko Saku Encyclopaedia" had been available since March of the same year, prior to the start of the on-demand streaming of the show.

On October 4, 2021, the video service VR SQUARE, operated by Softbank, also started providing on-demand streaming access to previous live television broadcasts of the show. Besides having the on-demand catch-up streaming service, various original contents, like spin-off videos, are also available on VR SQUARE and FR SQUARE. "Soko Saku VR" is one of the exclusive contents available on VR SQUARE.

On March 31, 2023, GYAO! stopped providing the broadcast catch-up service and the service is no longer accessible from 05:00 PM JST of that day.

On February 20, 2023, the 119th and 120th episode titled "Sakurazaka46 5th single hit prayer campaign" was released on YouTube by Sakurazaka46 OFFICIAL YouTube CHANNEL. The uploaded video has since been set to private by the channel owner.

On September 20, 2023, it was announced that VR SQUARE broadcast catch-up (on-demand streaming) and other original exclusives will no longer be added to platform from September 24, 2023, onward. Though, an archive of the already added contents on VR SQUARE will still be available according to the announcement post.

On March 12, 2024, during Sakurazaka46 4th ARENA TOUR 2024 in Osaka-jō Hall, it was announced that from April 8, 2024, the show will be available as a video on demand on the Lemino web streaming platform, which is operated by NTT Docomo. A special commemorative program for this occasion, scheduled to broadcast on March 22, 2024, was also announced.

== Casts ==
=== Regulars ===
==== Hosts ====
- Yū Sawabe (Haraichi)
- Teruyuki Tsuchida

==== Sakurazaka46 Members ====
Below are the Sakurazaka46 members who are still active in the show up until March 6, 2024:

- 1st Generation: Rina Uemura, Minami Koike, Fuyuka Saitō
- 2nd Generation: Rina Inoue, Hikaru Endō, Rei Ōzono, Akiho Ōnuma, Marino Kōsaka, Yui Takemoto, Hono Tamura, Karin Fujiyoshi, Kira Masumoto, Rina Matsuda, Hikaru Morita, Rena Moriya, Ten Yamasaki
- 3rd Generation: Rika Ishimori, Riko Endō, Reina Odakura, Nagisa Kojima, Airi Taniguchi, Yuzuki Nakashima, Mio Matono, Itoha Mukai, Yū Murai. Miu Murayama, Shizuki Yamashita

=== Past performers ===
Sakurazaka46 Graduates:

- 1st Generation: Akane Moriya, Rika Watanabe, Risa Watanabe, Aoi Harada, Rika Ozeki, Yūka Sugai, Mizuho Habu, Yui Kobayashi
- 2nd Generation: Riko Matsudaira, Yumiko Seki

=== Notable guests ===
Name	Episodes appeared in	Appearance information
Yoshiyuki Hamaguchi	3, 64, 116	In all episodes he made an appearance in, he appeared as a fortune teller.
Yuki Iwai (Haraichi)	30, 72–74	In episode 30, he appeared as a guest on the VTR. In episodes 72–74, he replaced Yū Sawabe, who caught COVID-19, as the show's temporary host.
Kayoko Okubo (Oasis)	35, 36	In both episodes she appeared as a mentor, teaching the members how to liven up the show.
Tani Plus 1	39	Tani Plus 1 is a Japanese comedian whose hobby is radio-controlled stuff including RC cars and drones. In this episode, he controlled the RC car used in the "Catch the RC car" challenge.
Nijihiko Amon	69	Appeared as a psychological expert, giving his psychological analysis on the members.
Gensai Jūmonji	78	Appeared as a hypnosis expert who uses hypnosis to help members overcome the things they are not good at dealing with.
Kumi Sasaki (Hinatazaka46)	82	Appeared as a guest on the VTR (video tape recording).
Neru Nagahama (former Keyakizaka46)	82	Appeared as a guest on the VTR (video tape recording).
Takahiro Ueno (more popularly known as TAKAHIRO)	82	Appeared as a guest on the VTR (video tape recording). He is the main choreographer for Sakurazaka46 (and the former group Keyakizaka46).
Miyo Ichikawa (former Japan Women's National Curling Team)	154	Both guests are Japanese professional female curlers. They appeared in the show as curling coaches.
Hinako Sonobe	154	Both guests are Japanese professional female curlers. They appeared in the show as curling coaches.
CRAZY COCO	156, 157	Appeared in both episodes as an English expert and instructor for the members.

== Episode list ==
=== 2020 ===
Episode	Original Broadcast Date	Episode Title	Synopsis	Studio Performance	Remarks
1	2020.10.19	Sakurazaka46 has started a new programme!	The programme has been renewed and relaunched together with Sakurazaka46! The members will work together to make the programme exciting with a new spirit! The name of the new programme will be announced in the studio! You can also look forward to the newly renovated set!	-	1st Single selection announcement
2	2020.10.26	Sakurazaka46 rally! Let's think about the new group (First Half)	The programme has been renewed, and the members announce what they want to do and what they want to try with a renewed spirit! What does Habu want to think about with everyone? And the members' new characters blossom!	-	-
3	2020.11.01	Sakurazaka46 rally! Let's think about the new group (Second Half)	Now that we've made a fresh start, let's have the future of Sakurazaka46 divined! The amazing Yocchan-sensei, who was also with us last time, is back with an astonishing accuracy rate! What are the fortunes of the individual members and the group? What was the reason for Sugai's tears?	-	-
4	2020.11.08	Let the new centre, Hikaru Morita, shine brighter!	A project featuring Hikaru Morita, who is the centre of Sakurazaka46 1st single 'Nobody's fault'! The duo Takemoto & Matsuda introduce an interesting side of Morita that we still don't know much about! The studio panics when Morita's favourite animal appears!	-	-
5	2020.11.15	Break down the group barriers! Sakurazaka46 three-way battle! (First Half)	Let's break down more generation barriers to work as one from now on! This time, three teams from the first and second generation will face off against each other! Teams that seem to get on well with each other will be awarded friendship points! Which team will get on best?	-	-
6	2020.11.22	Break down the group barriers! Sakurazaka46 three-way battle! (Second Half)	The second half of the session continues with the exciting battle between the three teams, including the "Pressure Relay" and the "〇〇Challenge"! Members try their hand at monoboke! The burikko is back again! Which team will win?	-	-
7	2020.11.29	Sakurazaka46 1st single hit prayer campaign! (First Half)	Finally, a hit prayer for Sakurazaka46's 1st single 'Nobody's fault', which will be released on 9 December! This time, they'll be going through a tougher ordeal than ever before! The members' energy and stamina will be tested in the hit prayer! Will they be able to achieve it safely and get off to a good start?	-	-
8	2020.12.06	Sakurazaka46 1st single hit prayer campaign! (Second Half)	The eight members of the Sakura Eight takes on the challenge of climbing a mountain to pray for a hit. The closer they get to the top, the steeper and steeper the path gets! With their physical strength being depleted, will they be able to overcome the remaining four challenges and pray for a hit at the summit with everyone in attendance?	Nobody's Fault	-
9	2020.12.13	Let's get excited about the 1st single - Nobody's Fault game! (First Half)	Challenged to play a game based on the lyrics of the first single 'Nobody's fault'! "Nobody's fault" = "It's nobody's fault" If you fail, you are jointly and severally responsible for the embarrassing punishment for all challengers! Onuma's unusual answer astonished everyone!	Saishū no Chikatetsu ni Notte	-
10	2020.12.20	Let's get excited about the 1st single - Nobody's Fault game! (Second Half)	They continued to play a game based on the lyrics of 'Nobody's Fault'! The 'Guess Your Strengths' quiz, where if you get the answer wrong you'll be 'arrogant'! Can you get the rhythm in silence and come out together at the chorus?	Buddies	-
11	2020.12.27	2020 Year in Review! The Great Clear Up SP	We're holding out our annual shredding project at the end of the year with "Keyakitte, Kakenai?" Clear up "things you left behind this year" and "things you want to ask this year"! Look back at the scenes that were cut and the surveys that were rejected! Let's get rid of the members' dissatisfaction and welcome the new year with peace of mind!	Naze Koi o Shite Konakattan darō?	-

=== 2021 ===
Episode	Original Broadcast Date	Episode Title	Synopsis	Studio Performance	Remarks
12	2021.01.10	Big New Year's Gift! Sakurazaka46 Great New Year's Party (1/3)	In order to start 2021 with a smile, which will be an important year for Sakurazaka46, the program has made a big move! The members compete for what they want, and the winner gets a present! We'll bring you a gorgeous look in our best!	Blue Moon Kiss	-
13	2021.01.17	Big New Year's Gift! Sakurazaka46 Great New Year's Party (2/3)	The members continue to battle it out for what they want! To further boost the New Year's party, we will enter the entertainment section!! The members show their tricks that they have prepared for this day! Don't miss the New Year's party, which is still going to be a lot of fun!	Hanshinhangi	-
14	2021.01.24	Big New Year's Gift! Sakurazaka46 Great New Year's Party (3/3)	The New Year's party is finally on its last night! Who wins the rest of the game and gets what they want!? Kousaka and Masumoto perform magic during the members' entertainment time, which continues from last week! In addition, Onuma's talented swamp song will be unveiled for the first time!	Plastic Regret	-
15	2021.01.31	Sakurazaka46 Sense Queen Tournament (1/3)	Who has the best sense among the members? Not only the sense of words, but also all other senses of art and design will be competed for and finally the MVP will be decided by Tsuchida! New talents of the members will be discovered!	-	-
16	2021.02.07	Sakurazaka46 Sense Queen Tournament (1/3)	Still to come! The Sense Queen Tournament! Sawabe puts on a fashion show wearing a T-shirt designed by a member! They also devise comments for the obi of an imaginary photo book of the members! And the Zero Sense Queen is born!?	-	-
17	2021.02.14	Sakurazaka46 Sense Queen Tournament (1/3)	The members came up with a program character!! Then a battle breaks out between Inoue and Takemoto! And a video queen praised by Onuma-sensei makes her appearance! Who will be crowned queen?	-	-
18	2021.02.21	Blue Moon Kiss Championship!!	The project was held in honour of the song 'Blue Moon Kiss', which is very popular among fans! Before the chorus, Morita says "Oh, I kissed you" and the members show their original words according to the theme!! Lots of revealing stories about things they want to apologise for and things they regret!	-	Last words from Riko Matsudaira, who announced her graduation.
19	2021.02.28	Sakurazaka46 Popular Members Grand Prix!!	All the members were asked who they would like to be their girlfriend! The results will be announced and the most popular member of Sakurazaka46 will be decided! As an extra feature, we'll also announce which member we wouldn't want as a girlfriend! Who is the most popular girl in the group?	-	2nd Single selection announcement
20	2021.03.07	Sakurazaka46 Popular Members Grand Prix!! Boyfriend Edition	In the second half, the members chose the top three "members they would like to have as boyfriends in the group"! A series of heart-throbbing episodes!? Finally, Sakurazaka's best couple was born!	-	-
21	2021.03.14	Celebration! Compulsory education is over! Celebrate Ten-chan's graduation from secondary school! (First Half)	A feature project to commemorate the graduation of Yamazaki Ten, the youngest in the group, from junior high school! Looking back on the past 15 years chronologically!! Episodes and photos from her childhood are also shown! Plus, a member survey on the recent Ten-chan!	-	-
22	2021.03.21	Celebration! Compulsory education is over! Celebrate Ten-chan's graduation from secondary school! (Second Half)	A table tennis revenge match with Sawabe that Ten-chan wanted to play! What happens in the match? And Inoue and Onuma perform a touching song they wrote! Plus, the members will give you a gorgeous present if you succeed in the kendama challenge!	-	-
23	2021.03.28	Let's get a New Year's party prize from the MC!	Tsuchida and Sawabe gives away products he wants with at his own expense to the members who got New Year's money at the big New Year's party project held at the beginning of the year! The members choose what they want from three kinds of products, but the two MCs are nervous because the price is not revealed until they decide..!	-	-
24	2021.04.04	Great Sale of Unwanted Items! Sakurazaka Shop Channel!	Members bring in "things that are still useful but no longer needed at home" and present them to the other members in the style of a mail-order programme! If a member sees it and wants it, they can have it on the spot! What kind of new products will come out?	-	-
25	2021.04.11	Sakurazaka46 2nd single hit prayer campaign	Pray for the hit of Sakurazaka46 2nd single "BAN", which will be released on 14 April! This time, captain Sugai and vice-captain Matsuda represent the members and go on a two-day, one-night temple retreat! The two people who lead the group face their own worries and work hard on their training for two days so that they can become strong people!	-	-
26	2021.04.18	Presentation of the side of me I haven't shown yet!! (First Half)	We've been doing the show for several years since the Keyakake era, but there's a secret side to the members that they haven't shown yet..! So, we'll introduce a side of the members that they haven't shown to the world yet! Finally, the members show their special skills that they have been writing about in questionnaires for years!	BAN	-
27	2021.04.25	Presentation of the side of me I haven't shown yet!! (Second Half)	Continuing with the presentation of the members' talents and special skills that they had not yet revealed to the world! Uemura, Erika, and Takemoto's hidden specialties are revealed!? And one member's sleeping voice is also revealed! Please look forward to the studio live too	Guuzen no Kotae	-
28	2021.05.02	I'll tell you rare information about that girl! Sakurazaka Stories Between You and I! (First Half)	Last time we asked the members to reveal their unexpected sides, but we think they still have rare information! This time, we ask the members to tip off information they know only from each other! A lot of stories are coming out for the first time!	Omotta Yori Mo Sabishikunai	-
29	2021.05.09	I'll tell you rare information about that girl! Sakurazaka Stories Between You and I! (Second Half)	The members continue to tip off information that they know only because they are members of each other! What is Rika more addicted to than bread at the moment!? Everyone is astonished at how Akane Moriya spends her time at home!! Inoue teases Takemoto!?	Kimi to Boku to Sentakumono	-
30	2021.05.16	Congratulations on Sawabe's 35th (Birthday)! King Sawabe Championship!	To celebrate Sawabe's 35th birthday, a quiz contest will be held to decide who knows the most about Yu Sawabe!! The members who have been studying Sawabe's information will be divided into five teams and compete again this time... and Sawabe gets Bullied!? Who will shine on King Sawabe?	Microscope	-
31	2021.05.23	BAN? Do not BAN? Presentation of things I can't stop doing!	Hanging on the title of the second single 'BAN', the members announce what they want to stop doing in their daily lives but can't! Tsuchida judges whether they should stop doing it or not! Things that the members want to quit, such as staying up late and shopping, are discovered one after another!?	Sore ga Ai Nano ne	-
32	2021.05.30	Latest edition! Sakurazaka46 Academic Ranking!! (1/3)	The first academic achievement test since Sakurazaka46! What are the academic abilities of the six 2nd generation members who have never taken an achievement test before doing so? The studio laughed out loud with a series of interesting answers this time too! And the two members who were in the bottom of the class last time, have done it again!?	Sakurazaka no Uta	-
33	2021.06.06	Latest edition! Sakurazaka46 Academic Ranking!! (2/3)	We continue to check out the unusual answers to the academic tests! And finally, the rankings are announced!! The top 5 people will try the speedy quiz and decide who is the Intelligence Queen!! Which dark horse will threaten the previous champion, Harada!? Who will be the first intellectual queen!?	-	-
34	2021.06.13	Latest edition! Sakurazaka46 Academic Ranking!! (3/3)	Continuing with the lower rankings of the academic test!! The members who have been placed in the bottom five are forced to take part in a speedy quiz to decide who will be the queen of the idiots!! The MC is helpless because of a series of stupid answers by stupid people!? How can you get a dishonorable title!?	-	-
35	2021.06.20	I want to know more! Lecture on techniques to liven up programmes (First Half)	Recently, members have become more proactive: "I want to study and make the program more exciting!" So let's learn some techniques to liven up the show from our guest, Kayoko Okubo!! First of all, let's talk about the members' worries and questions!!	-	-
36	2021.06.27	I want to know more! Lecture on techniques to liven up programmes (Second Half)	Continuing on, the members learn techniques from guest Kayoko Okubo to liven up the show! The second half is the practical part! To learn how to wrestle with variety, try microphone performance! The causal showdown is back again with the super-serious "slap and cover rock-paper-scissors pong" to eliminate any reservations about seniors!	-	-
37	2021.07.04	Who has the best voice talent? Voice acting aptitude check!	We want the members to expand their activities in the future, including voice acting work! So, check their aptitude to see who is suitable for voice acting!! While reading children's songs, instantly change your voice tone by becoming the title character!! Trying to dub using a character of your own creation!?	-	-
38	2021.07.11	Get it with everyone's bond! BACKS members united game (First Half)	BACKS members, who are said to have deepened their ties after the recent BACKS LIVE!!, will challenge the game of unity!! Each time they clear the game, they get the right to try their hand at reward-earning curling! What was Onuma's unusual play that had everyone rolling with laughter!? Full of live episodes too!!	-	-
39	2021.07.18	Get it with everyone's bond! BACKS members united game (Second Half)	BACKS members game of unity - second half! The BACKS members are still struggling! How many stones can you get in an RC car catch and a gachinko tug-of-war match Then, they try their hand at curling with the stones they've won! Will you get your reward?	-	-
40	2021.07.25	Get through it! Things only I am manically obsessed with!	The members present their own "maniacal hobbies and passions" that no one else around them can relate to! They revealed that they "like to look at them all the time" one after another! What is it that Saito and Morita like and collect? Your unique and unusual face is revealed!!	-	-
41	2021.08.01	I'm having problems with that girl! Member complaint box	There may be a lot of behaviour among the members that you "actually want them to stop" or "have trouble with". We have therefore called for complaints on the programme! Let's look at the contents of the complaints and try to put out the fires of trouble! The members exchange their complaints with each other!	-	-
42	2021.08.08	Academic tests don't matter! Quick-witted Queen Battle (First Half)	The members who are good at the academic ability test the other day were clear, but this time, regardless of knowledge, they will compete with each other with their "Quick-wittiness"! Will the members who performed poorly in the test be able to get rid of their stupidity? Who will be the fastest thinking member!?	-	3rd Single selection announcement
43	2021.08.15	Academic tests don't matter! Quick-witted Queen Battle (Second Half)	The quiz showdown continues with a 'quick-wittiness' competition! Questions that require inspiration to solve come one after another! Members who lost in the first and second stages also have a chance to come back as losers! Who will be the first Quick-witted Queen!?	-	-
44	2021.08.22	Memory quiz! I'd be shocked if the 2nd generation members forgot (First Half)	The members quiz the other members on the memories they want to be remembered for! The 2nd generation students will try this project that the 1st generation students did before! If the correct answer is less than 3 out of 6 questions, this time the brain is activated with a foot acupressure! Do the members remember their memories with other members!?	-	To prevent the spread of the new coronavirus infection, the MC's seats were separated, but this time they returned to the table.
45	2021.08.29	Memory quiz! I'd be shocked if the 2nd generation members forgot (Second Half)	The 2nd generation students will continue the memory quiz about the memories that other members must remember! An interesting episode between the members that still comes out!! Will the members avoid the foot acupressure!? And Ozeki appeared after a while! Please look forward to it!	-	-
46	2021.09.05	Sakurazaka46 Common Sense Queen Championship	So far, we have decided on all kinds of queens - Sense, Academics and Quick-wit - but there is actually one title we haven't decided on yet! It's Common Sense! Who in the group has the most common sense and way of thinking!? Rely on your senses and find out who is the majority in the world!!	-	-
47	2021.09.12	Get to know the life of our new centre Tamura Hono from the very first step! (First Half)	Let's delve into Tamura, who is the of the 3rd single "Nagaredama", and uncover some unknown charms! With the help of her family, we look back on 22 years timeline of her life! Episodes and photos of your childhood will be shown to the public!!	-	-
48	2021.09.19	Get to know the life of our new centre Tamura Hono from the very first step! (Second Half) and Autumn of Appetite! Gourmet presentation show (First Half)	This time it's a double feature! In the Tamura feature project, the members who are always together with her presents things about her! What's more! The members present their recommendation gourmet!! If you win, you can enjoy that gourmet food!! What kind of gourmet food will appear!?	-	This episode features two different topics in a single episode
49	2021.09.26	Autumn of Appetite! Gourmet presentation show (Second Half)	The members continue to present their favourite gourmet recommendations in earnest! The second round is a sweets showdown! Can Rika and Takemoto win against Akane Moriya's tough presentation? Lastly, a gourmet showdown between Sugai and Chairman Yumiko! What kind of high-end gourmet will be served!?	-	-
50	2021.10.03	Is this weird? The crazy side of me! (First Half)	The members present their slightly crazy behaviours and impulses, which are difficult to tell to others! Then, using psychology, the essence of their behaviour is revealed! The crazy side of Sakurazaka46 has been revealed!? Furthermore! The contents of the 3rd single hit prayer campaign are revealed!!	-	The second half of this episode is aired on the 53rd episode (2021.10.24)
51	2021.10.10	Sakurazaka46 3rd single hit prayer campaign (First Half)	The third hit prayer, in which Sakura 8 dips in to the world of 'trapeze'. This time, they will practice in advance and aim to succeed in the "knee-hang catch" technique. The challenge is at a high altitude and the timing has to be right to succeed! With Tsucchi Sawabe and the BACKS members watching on site, will they achieve their hit prayer?	-	-
52	2021.10.17	Sakurazaka46 3rd single hit prayer campaign (Second Half)	A behind-the-scenes look at the hit prayer that didn't make it into the previous broadcast! We will show you how the members practiced beforehand and how the BACKS members challenged themselves! Then, just one year after Soko Saku started, we held a discussion meeting! The members talk about what they want to do in the future with the programme.	-	-
53	2021.10.24	There's more to come! The crazy side of me! (Second Half)	Continuing from the other day, the members' slightly crazy behaviour and impulses that they couldn't say much about were presented! There were more unknown sides to them!! The members' various fetishes will be revealed!? Plus, a studio live performance of the 3rd single "Nagaredama"! Enjoy!	Nagaredama	-
54	2021.10.31	Wild request! Sakurazaka46 Halloween Championship	Halloween is all about cosplay! This time, however, the members nominate the members they want to cosplay and give them a complete makeover! What kind of cosplay will the nominated members appear in!? And there will also be a game showdown! In the studio live, they performed 'Dead End'!	Dead End	-
55	2021.11.07	The first Sakurazaka46 "Aru Aru Presentation"	The members will present the "Aru Aru Behaviour" in Sakurazaka46, which only the members can understand! Other members press a certain button to measure the agreement among the members! An impersonation of the members who is bound to burst into laughter!! In the studio live, they perform "Mugon no Uchu"!	Mugon no Uchu	"Aru aru" means like "oh, yeah, yeah, that does happen"
56	2021.11.14	The second Sakurazaka46 "Aru Aru Presentation"	More of the members' "certain actions and behaviours", which were also very popular in the previous edition, is still being presented! The members' impersonations of certain members were a great success again! The members' impersonations were also sympathized by the MCs! Which one will win the most sympathy from the members this time!?	-	-
57	2021.11.21	If this is the case, I am the No. 1! Queen nomination!	Members who have never been crowned queen of anything on the show run for the title in their area of expertise! They are tested in the studio, and if they are worthy, they are recognised as queens! Inoue cries!? What queen is Fujiyoshi running for!? Who will be the new queen!?	-	-
58	2021.11.28	Looking back at Sakurazaka's year with the members' smartphone photos! (First Half)	To commemorate the first anniversary of Sakurazaka46, we will look back on how the members have spent the past year with photos and videos on their smartphones!! A big release of photos and videos that have never been shown in Japan before!! The members' everyday life is laid bare!?	-	-
59	2021.12.05	Looking back at Sakurazaka's year with the members' smartphone photos! (Second Half)	We continue to look back at the second half of 2021 with photos and videos taken by our members!! Some photos that had been kept in storage will be leaked!? A lot of shocking off-shoots!? A large selection of treasured photos and videos that were still lying dormant!!	-	-
60	2021.12.12	Sakurazaka46 Year End Sports Day! (First Half)	To make the last memories of this year, we will hold a big sports day that the members have longed for!! The battle between "Team Rather Pacifist" led by Sugai and "Team Gachi" led by Akane Moriya is back after five years! They face off in a total of five events!! A series of unusual and good plays!! The legendary pink hachimaki of the PTA president also makes an appearance!	-	-
61	2021.12.19	Sakurazaka46 Year End Sports Day! (Second Half)	For the first time in almost five years, the heated battle between "Team Gachi" vs. "Team Rather Pacifist" is now in its second half! It's settled with the remaining three games! Can the "Rather Pacifist" team turn the tables!? Sergeant Akane Moriya is now unbeatable in one of the competitions!? Which team will win the reward location this time!?	-	-
62	2021.12.26	Thanks for the past 6 years! Akane Moriya and Rika Watanabe graduation project	Everyone looks back at the past successes of Moriya and Rika, who have been active for about six years as 1st generation members, and makes what the two wanted to do before they graduate come true!! Also things the members wanted to do for the two of them! And finally, a message from the two graduating members.	-	-

=== 2022 ===
Episode	Original Broadcast Date	Episode Title	Synopsis	Studio Performance	Remarks
63	2022.01.09	New Year 2022! Sakurazaka46 Sugoroku Tournament! (First Half)	The first game of the new year is a team-to-team game in which 5 women of the year become leaders and are divided into five teams!! The goal of the game is the "Fortune Teller's House", where fortune teller Yocchan awaits! The team that finishes first wins the right to have their fortune told personally!	-	Women of the year refers to the members whose Chinese zodiac matches the current year's Chinese Zodiac.
64	2022.01.16	New Year 2022! Sakurazaka46 Sugoroku Tournament! (Second Half)	Continuing on, the New Year's Sugoroku Tournament between teams aiming for a goal!! In the second half, we will continue to challenge ourselves with various games! Which team will finish first and have their fortune told by Yocchan? And what will the group's fortune be in 2022?	-	-
65	2022.01.23	Celebration! New adult member maturity check! (First Half)	Takemoto, Fujiyoshi, Morita and Masumoto will be coming of age in 2022. Do the four of them have the common sense and manners they want to acquire as adults!? We invited a manners instructor to check their 'adult ability', including language skills and manners!! Which member is the most 'mature' of them all!?	-	-
66	2022.01.30	Celebration! New adult member maturity check! (Second Half)	In the second half, new adult members Takemoto, Fujiyoshi, Morita and Masumoto will go to a location where they can experience the adult world!! They each dress up in what they think is an adult outfit for a photo shoot! Then, as a celebration from the programme, they enjoy some high-class sushi, but with a shocking ending!?	-	-
67	2022.02.06	Let us do it too! 2nd generation's valentine's delusional confession! (First Half)	Since it's Valentine's Day, the second generation students will confess their true delusions like the 1st generation members had previously performed! This time, too, the members produced their own scripts and costumes, and recreated their own 'ideal confessions'! What is the ideal situation that the members think of!?	-	-
68	2022.02.13	Let us do it too! 2nd generation's valentine's delusional confession! (Second Half)	Continuing with the Valentine's Day delusional confession situation, produced by the second generation members themselves! Even in the second half, the members' throbbing won't stop!? Why is Hikaru-senpai so angry!? Then, a ridiculous delusional play of Masumoto's world was born!!	-	-
69	2022.02.20	Is this weird? My top 10 scariest things	The members each rank what they find "scary"! From sympathetic to unique, the members will show a variety of scary things that are full of individuality! Then, the members who were interested in them are checked by psychological analysis! The teacher makes his first appearance in a while!?	-	-
70	2022.02.27	Don't be shy to tell them! A day to convey your gratitude	A heart-warming project in which members who regularly help each other and give each other gifts express their gratitude to members who have not yet been able to thank them! Unknown episodes within the members are revealed!? Who do you want to thank now!? But be careful not to be conceited!!	-	-
71	2022.03.06	Emergency project! A big release of divine scenes and lost scenes that I want to see again SP	Tsuchida and Sawabe each chose a "famous rare scene from there that I want to see again"! Along with nostalgic videos, there are also unreleased videos that have unfortunately been cut!? The chosen members also talk about behind-the-scenes stories and later episodes! What scene did the two MCs think was the funniest!?	-	-
72	2022.03.13	Things about the members only I know quiz! (First Half)	Members are asked to take a 'member quiz that only they may know'! The other members challenge the quiz! Rewards are given to the contestants who provide rare information and to those who answer the quiz correctly! The latest unknown information about the members will be revealed!?	-	During these three episodes, MC Yū Sawabe caught coronavirus so Yuki Iwai, his partner in Haraichi, replaced him.
73	2022.03.20	Things about the members only I know quiz! (Second Half)	The members continued with a 'member quiz that only you would know'! What was Onuma's appearance at her parents' house that surprised Takemoto? What does Risa do only when she plays with Harada? What does Ozeki eat almost every day? The second half is full of information about the members!!	-	During these three episodes, MC Yū Sawabe caught coronavirus so Yuki Iwai, his partner in Haraichi, replaced him.
74	2022.03.27	Aim for serialization! Sakusatsu!	Nogisatsu and Hinasatsu are popular, but there must be some good photos lying around in the off-shots taken by Sakurazaka members of each other! This time, each member will bring their own photos under the theme of "My favourite photos" and each member will decide on their best shot! A lot of photos that have never been shown before!?	-	During these three episodes, MC Yū Sawabe caught coronavirus so Yuki Iwai, his partner in Haraichi, replaced him.
75	2022.04.03	Sakurazaka46 4th single hit prayer campaign	In order to pray for the success of their 4th single "Samidare yo", the members are going to try their hand at "Kyudo". Yamasaki, Risa, and Morita, who plays the centre role in this album, aim to hit the target three times in a row! The pressure of consecutive successes and the unprecedented high level of skill and concentration required for this challenge. Will they be able to achieve their hit prayers in style!?	-	-
76	2022.04.10	Fool them with your performance! Team Wolf Queen Championship! (First Half)	April means April Fool's Day, so for the first time in a long time, the two teams face off in a game of deception!! Five Tamura and Onuma appear! Pretend to be the person you are and trick the other team!! Impromptu stories of memories related to the false article that was put out!!	-	-
77	2022.04.17	Fool them with your performance! Team Wolf Queen Championship! (Second Half)	Continuing the deception showdown between the teams! Each of the four members is eating their favourite food, but three of them actually hate it!? Who's really gurgling and who's cutting corners!? The second half is a physical deception match! Can you fool the other team while acting well!?	Samidare yo	-
78	2022.04.24	Project to overcome things you are not good with through hypnosis	If there is something you are not good at, it could make it difficult to be invited to different programmes!? So, let's try to overcome the things that members just can't overcome with the help of hypnosis! What are the things the members want to overcome!? In addition, they perform 'Boku no Dilemma' in the studio live! Enjoy!	Boku no Dilemma	-
79	2022.05.01	Masumoto's Sparkling Present Show	Masumoto, who says she wants to give gifts to all kinds of people, is given a budget of 50,000 yen and asked to buy gifts for the 1st generation members as a token of appreciation! The items are chosen with a unique sense of style!! But Munchaburi Masumoto attacks his seniors!? And a studio live performance of "Shakankyori"	Shakanyori	The Japanese title, Masumoto kira kira purezento shō (増本キラキラプレゼントショー), is a word play of Masumoto Kira's name. Kira kira (キラキラ) in Japanese means sparkling.
80	2022.05.08	Let Me Speak! A passionate presentation show of things I like!	Like Yamazaki's recently discovered love of Spider-Man, the members are holding a presentation show to let everyone know about their "favourite things" and talk about them passionately! Will Tamura's enthusiastic presentation reach Tsucchi...? Will Inoue get her revenge!? What will the outcome be!?	-	-
81	2022.05.15	Risa Watanabe Graduation Celebration on Location! (First Half)	To celebrate the graduation of Risa, who has now graduated from the group, they go on location for the first time after a long time! Together with Tsucchi and Sawabe, the members look back on their old days with the members who have rushed to the location, visiting memorable places. Each member also gives a gratitude message to Risa, who has led the group up to now.	-	-
82	2022.05.22	Risa Watanabe Graduation Celebration on Location! (Second Half)	Following up, the 2nd generation members sent a message of gratitude to the Risa. In the second half, what Risa wanted to do was also realized! What awaits her on the road with Tsucchi and Sawabe...? And last but not least, the friends with whom she has shared many hardships and joys will also give their final words. Finally, a message from Risa to everyone.	-	-
83	2022.05.29	The 2nd Let Me Speak! A passionate presentation show of things I like!	The second edition of the event has already been held due to the popularity of the previous one! The members are still around, and they want to talk passionately about their "favourite things"!! What is Morita's favourite thing that she's addicted to and constantly checks out!? Onuma talks passionately about her favourite creature and Rena about her favourite food!!	-	-
84	2022.06.05	Actually, there's more, isn't there? Squeezing members for stories!	The staff were astonished when they saw that the members had given strong episodes that they had never heard of before in other programmes... So this time, we decided to ask them to come up with stories that they had never talked about before! A lot of information is revealed that even the members didn't know about each other!?	-	-
85	2022.06.12	Mass survey! Sakurazaka46 Anything Ranking!	In order to discover new characters among the members, a survey was conducted on various themes, asking "Who would be the best among the members in this ranking?"!! Then, based on the results, the best three of each ranking are announced!! What will happen? Unexpected members are ranked!?	-	Harada Aoi who graduated from the group presents her final messages.
86	2022.06.19	Inoue Presents! Battle for the Queen with no sense of taste	Inoue's long-awaited revenge project for her failed attempts at tasting orange juice and ice cream, in which the members made fun of her sense of taste, has come to live! In order to expose the members who have no sense of taste hidden in Inoue's shadow, they compete with each other in taste!! Can Inoue get out of the crisis!? Who shines as the dishonorable Queen!?	-	-
87	2022.06.26	Find the hidden stars! Three-way quiz battle! (First Half)	Now that Harada, who represented Sakurazaka's intellectuals on numerous programmes, is no longer with us, a quiz competition is held to find a new quiz slot! The quiz battle was divided into three teams, led by Takemoto, Ozono and Inoue! The questions cover a wide range of topics from general knowledge to specialised fields! Will a new quiz star be discovered?	-	-
88	2022.07.03	Find the hidden stars! Three-way quiz battle! (Second Half)	The quiz battle continued, divided into three teams! Onuma's miraculously unusual answers!? Inoue goes for the big game!? Can you solve the difficult questions read out by Rena, who can't read sentences correctly? Can the bottom-ranked Takemoto team turn the tables? Which team will win?	-	-
89	2022.07.10	The 2nd Mass survey! Sakurazaka46 Anything Ranking!	Once again, the best three members of every ranking in the group are announced based on a survey conducted on the members! Who are the fashionable and generous people chosen by the members!? Another member comes up with an unexpected ranking!?	-	-
90	2022.07.17	Sakurazaka46 THE SUMMER MATCH!! (1/3)	It's the middle of summer, so the two teams put on their happi coats and face off in a summery game!! The winning team gets an exquisite cool sweet! From the first game, carry a portable shrine and get all wet!? And then we bring you scary ghost stories that our members have actually experienced. Blow away the heat wave!!	-	-
91	2022.07.24	Sakurazaka46 THE SUMMER MATCH!! (2/3)	The hot summer battle between the two teams enters the middle stage! Next up: a water pistol showdown! Speaking of summer, Sakurazaka46 gets drenched every year at their live performances. Just like last week, this week they'll get drenched again!? The MC also praises the summer kyun movie that the members have filmed with their smartphones!	-	In Japanese, Kyun means heart-wringing which in this context usually means cute pictures that makes you have butterflies.
92	2022.07.31	Sakurazaka46 THE SUMMER MATCH!! (3/3)	Finally, the final battle!! Can you complete your task without ringing the wind chime on your head!? New talents of the members blossom in the new competition!? A mysterious new unit is born! Which team will win and get the best shaved ice!?	-	-
93	2022.08.07	Album Release Commemoration! Let's look back at Sakurazaka46 MVs! (First Half)	To commemorate the release of the 1st album, we will look back on the MV (music videos) of Sakurazaka46's previous singles while listening to the members' explanations and behind-the-scenes stories! A series of unknown episodes, such as the members' favorite points and incidents behind the scenes, are revealed one after another!?	-	-
94	2022.08.14	Album Release Commemoration! Let's look back at Sakurazaka46 MVs! (Second Half)	We continue to look back on Sakurazaka46's music video while listening to the recommended points and secret stories of the shooting! What happened on the set of the 3rd single "Nagaredama" and the 4th single "Samidare yo"!? The members burst into laughter at the episodes and footage that are still coming out for the first time!	-	-
95	2022.08.21	Presentation of the proverbs I have learned in my life! (First Half)	Seven years have passed since the group was formed. The members, who have gained a certain amount of life experience, present a saying about "the lessons they have learnt in life that they would like to share with everyone!" From informative lessons to not-so-helpful ones? What kind of proverbs will come out!? But Ozeki's unexpected happening leads to a mysterious turn of events!?	-	-
96	2022.08.28	Presentation of the proverbs I have learned in my life! (Second Half)	Continuing from the last issue, the members present the lessons learnt in life that they have gained from their life experiences, which they would like to share with everyone, as proverbs! Masumoto says a proverb that everyone agrees with!? Watch out for the mocking contest that heats up even more! Which proverb will be chosen as the MVP...!?	-	-
97	2022.09.04	Members praise project! That is me! (First Half)	In order to get members who are reluctant to receive praise to become more proactive, a project to praise members was carried out! From a questionnaire conducted with about 50 staff members who know the members well, one complimentary point was announced for each member! If you hear that and think, "It's about me!" then they will come forward! But beware of self-admiration!?	-	-
98	2022.09.11	Members praise project! That is me! (Second Half)	Following the last time, the staff members will present what they think are the best compliments for the members!!! Who's next to be praised!? Will they be able to get rid of their poor skill at receiving compliments!? Plus, a surprise for Ozeki!? Finally, a message to everyone from Ozeki, who is graduating from the group.	-	Ozeki Rika who graduated from the group presents her final messages.
99	2022.09.18	Kōsaka Marino's DEATH game! (First Half)	Kōsaka Presents Death Game is Held!! Those who successfully win the game will be awarded with a splendid prize! But if you fail, there will be a merciless punishment..! Don't go against Marino!! And watch out for her assistant Masumoto!?	-	-
100	2022.09.25	Kōsaka Marino's DEATH game! (Second Half)	The remaining members of Block C face a challenge from Lady Marino! The members struggle against the low-pitched death voice!? And in the final battle, Marino-sama finally descends on the studio!! The members face off directly against each other! Who will win the Death Game!?	-	-
101	2022.10.02	Sakurazaka46 autumn artistic instincts check! (First Half)	We haven't done a proper members' drawing check before, so now that it's autumn in the arts, we're finally holding it! Can you draw a picture of the subject from memory!? Habu-sensei's masterpiece is born!? And live drawings in the studio. Enjoy a variety of works by the painters!	-	-
102	2022.10.09	Sakurazaka46 autumn artistic instincts check! (Second Half)	In the second half, the members are divided into two teams for an inter-team game battle! New species of creatures are born one after another in the combined creature picture quiz!? In addition, there is a Sakurazaka music picture quiz! The difficulty level of the questions increases and the member's drawing ability is tested, but what kind of pictures will they draw!?	-	-
103	2022.10.16	New Discovery! The Three Sisters of Sakurazaka (First Half)	The wind-chime sisters, Saito, Matsuda and Morita, were born as part of a summer showdown project. This time, in order to discover new Three Sisters, the members will challenge themselves to do what they are good at and say "I can be the Three Sisters if I can do this!" The three who seem to be able to clear the challenge will try to do what they are good at! First of all, the Three Limbo Sisters will be chosen!	-	-
104	2022.10.23	New Discovery! The Three Sisters of Sakurazaka (Second Half)	In order to discover three new sisters following the three wind-chime sisters, we aim to create three sisters with dexterity and memory in the second half!! And finally, those three return..! The three wind chime sisters try that trick again!! Will they succeed this time!?	-	-
105	2022.10.30	Straight from the members! Gourmet food combinations!	As autumn is the season of appetite, the members introduce their own recommended gourmet food combinations! Tamura and the MC, who left the adage that "the combination of Japanese and Western is the best," will examine it! There are plenty of combinations that have both pros and cons!! You will definitely want to try it too!?	-	Tamura Hono joins as the show's MC for this episode.
106	2022.11.06	Seven years of hard work! Celebrating the graduation of Sugai Yūka! (First Half)	Sugai, who has served as the group's captain, is graduating, and to show our gratitude for everything she has done, we will treat Sugai with all the hospitality she deserves!! We send her off by fulfilling what Sugai wants to do and what the members want to do for her! The members are also doing their best to please Sugai-sama!	-	-
107	2022.11.13	Seven years of hard work! Celebrating the graduation of Sugai Yūka! (Second Half)	In the second half, more and more things that Sugai wants to do and the members want to do for her are realised! What location did Sugai and Masumoto come to!? And then there's the 1st generation meeting! There are stories that can only be told now. And the members gave Sugai a nice surprise present! Finally, a message from Sugai to everyone.	-	Final message from Sugai Yūka, who graduated on 9 November 2022.
108	2022.11.20	Autumn of reading: Presentation show of the book that made my life! (First Half)	Members give a presentation on the book that changed their lives, which they recommend for the autumn reading season! Finally, Tsuchida decided whose book he wanted to read the most!! From manga to practical books and talent books, various genres of books have appeared!! What kind of books influenced the members!?	-	-
109	2022.11.27	Book presentation show (Second Half) and Home item collection (First Half)	This time, we have two projects! The second half of "Autumn of Reading: Presentation show of the book that made my life!" and the first half of "QOL boost! My collection of home items" Following on from last time, we present the recommended "books that have influenced my life" for the autumn reading season!! Inoue transforms herself into her dream 〇〇! Plus, we introduce the special items in the members' homes that enrich their lives! But Ten-chan makes a mess!?	-	QOL is an abbreviation for Quality of Life.
110	2022.12.04	QOL boost! My collection of home items (Second Half)	Continuing from the previous issue, the members introduce the 'special items that enrich their lives' in their house! What are Onuma and Rena's favourite electrical appliances!? From useful items to items related to their hobbies, there are a lot of items that show how the curious members spend their time at home!?	-	-
111	2022.12.11	Sakurazaka46 Hit Ranking 2022 (First Half)	A ranking of what was popular among members, apart from what was popular in the world during the year! Not only items, but also silly games that were popular only among some members, and a lot of private material!? The show will end when the atmosphere in the studio becomes unbearable due to the backstage humour. Please watch with care.	-	-
112	2022.12.18	Sakurazaka46 Hit Ranking 2022 (Second Half)	Continuing the list of what was popular among the members this year! In the second half, the members rank the original backstage games thought up by the members! What kind of game is it!? In addition, the items that all the members have and the unexpected food boom is revealed!? Off-shoots from their personal cameras are also shown!!	-	-
113	2022.12.25	2022 Year in Review! The Great Clear Up Special	The annual end-of-year project returns for the first time after two years! The members announce what they want to say and what they want to resolve this year! Revealing rejected questionnaires and cut scenes!? The familiar shredding will be used to make offerings and clear away the bother before the end of the year!	-	5th Single selection announcement.

=== 2023 ===
Episode	Original Broadcast Date	Episode Title	Synopsis	Studio Performance	Remarks
114	2023.01.08	Celebration! 2023 Pyon Pyon New Year's Party (1/3)	New Year's game battle between two teams, led by a woman of the year! In honour of the Year of the Rabbit, the members dressed as rabbits challenge you to a game of leaping and jumping!! The winning team will have their fortune told for 2023!! The rabbits are excited to start the New Year!?	-	Woman of the year are the members whose Chinese Zodiac sign matches the current year's zodiac sign.
115	2023.01.15	Celebration! 2023 Pyon Pyon New Year's Party (2/3)	The long-awaited entertainment time for the New Year's party has begun!! The members who have been practicing for this day will perform tricks against each other!! The magic show by the Kiramari duo is back!? A swamp dance by dance members was born!! Inoue & Fujiyoshi's rice cake making, Onuma's 〇〇 demolition show, and many other things to see!!	-	-
116	2023.01.22	Celebration! 2023 Pyon Pyon New Year's Party (3/3)	The New Year's party is now 30–10 in favour of Team "Rabbit"! With victory on the line, the second half of the game is also jumping up and down! Which team will be able to get Yocchan's fortune-telling!? And what's the fortune of the group for 2023!?	-	-
117	2023.01.29	Commemorating the inauguration of the new captain! Get to know Rina Matsuda!	A feature project on Matsuda, who has been appointed captain of Sakurazaka46! With the cooperation of her family, we look back at Matsuda's upbringing in a timeline!! Episodes from childhood, precious photos and videos are also released!! A little-known side of Matsuda is also revealed!?	-	-
118	2023.02.05	Eat this and your heart will be warm! Winter gourmet presentation show	This is the second edition of the gourmet presentation project, which was so much fun before!! The members present the recommended local gourmet food they want everyone to try!! Only the member who chooses the gourmet dish that gets the most votes in the studio can eat it!! What kind of gourmet food will appear this time?!	-	-
119	2023.02.12	Sakurazaka46 5th single hit prayer campaign (First Half)	Rena Moriya, who is appointed as centre for the first time with the fifth single "Sakurazuki", and Rina Matsuda, the new captain of the group, take on the challenge of praying for a hit! Moriya has been chosen to be the centre in this single after spending some time as a Sakamichi trainee in the lower ranks. So this time, they will run up to the top from 0m above sea level!! On the way, a certain person rushes to support them!?	-	-
120	2023.02.19	Sakurazaka46 5th single hit prayer campaign (Second Half)	Matsuda and Moriya, pushed on by Onuma's support, pedalled their bicycles again. Then, with the fatigue of kayaking and biking accumulated, they went on to climb to the top of Mt. Washizu. In the rain, they encouraged each other to keep going. Starting from 0 m above sea level, will they be able to reach the summit safely!?	-	-
121	2023.02.26	Before the 3rd generation enters, we have to tidy up the black history of the show!	Let's take this opportunity to seal off the embarrassing past of the members that we don't want the soon-to-be juniors to know about!! Reveal what the members consider to be their own black history, including their early days, their lost characters, their slip-ups and failures at live shows!! Blush at the footage from those embarrassing days!?	-	-
122	2023.03.05	A thrilling first appearance! Welcome, Sakurazaka 3rd generation! (1/3)	The 11 new 3rd generation members who have joined Sakurazaka46 finally make their first appearance in the studio!! The senior members introduce the new members' curious profiles and special skills to everyone!! What kind of unique members are here!? Let's warmly watch the third term students who are full of nervousness and newness!!	Sakurazuki	-
123	2023.03.12	A thrilling first appearance! Welcome, Sakurazaka 3rd generation! (2/3)	The fresh 3rd generation members continue to make an appearance in the studio!! They introduce themselves to the seniors and show off their individual personalities!! Some members show off their amazing skills!? Plus, a studio live performance of Ozono's centre song 'Cool'!	Cool	-
124	2023.03.19	A thrilling first appearance! Welcome, Sakurazaka 3rd generation! (3/3)	There are only four 3rd generation members left to introduce themselves!! Some of them are so nervous they cry!! The momentum of the 3rd generation members continues with the arrival of the athletic members and the third Kira Kids! Then they performed the 3rd generation song 'Natsu no Chikamichi' at the studio live!	Natsu no Chikamichi	-
125	2023.03.26	Whatever you answer is correct! Assertiveness quiz! (First Half)	To encourage members to be more active, we organise a buzzer quiz competition where no matter what the answer is, it will be the correct answer!! The questions are not academic quizzes, but personal questions that anyone can answer!! If they win, they will be rewarded!! You might be able to hear information about the members that they haven't told you anywhere yet!?	-	-
126	2023.04.02	Whatever you answer is correct! Assertiveness quiz! (Second Half)	Continuing with the goal of winning gourmet food, active members will continue to answer personal questions!! Information may appear for the first time in the second half!? Habu's world explodes!? Furthermore, a final match will be held to decide the most proactive member!! Who shines as the Active Queen!?	-	-
127	2023.04.09	Get along with your seniors! Charge on! Kirako's cram school! (First Half)	For 3rd generation members who want to get to know their seniors better, the ghost of communication skills, Masumoto, gives a lecture on how to get closer to the senior members! Each member is taught a different strategy! And the 3rd generation members struggle in practice based on Masumoto's lecture!? Can the seniors and the 3rd generation members get closer?	-	-
128	2023.04.16	Get along with your seniors! Charge on! Kirako's cram school! (Second Half)	Next, the head of the cram school, Masumoto, continues to teach the 3rd generation members how to capture and pay attention to senior members!! Odakura sets her sights on Fujiyoshi!? Habu's manliness is on full display!? Some of them are not very good at handling things. Is Masumoto's lecture properly on target!?	-	-
129	2023.04.23	Aim for Whiteness! Spring bargaining session on improving the workplace environment!	These days, the working environment is improving with the promotion of work style reforms. So, let's make this programme, which is the workplace of the members, a better working environment! The members propose and negotiate improvement ideas for the programme!! The adopted ideas are put into practice from the next recording! Various requests are coming out from the members!?	-	-
130	2023.04.30	Better than normal talent presentation	The members can do this better than the average level!! The members show a little skill that they think they can do better than the general level!! The members compete against the other member who represents the general level, and if they win, it is recognised as a special skill!! Will Inoue finally be able to clear her name!? Also, watch out for the studio that has changed after the last project to improve the working environment!?	-	Final message from Yumiko Seki, who graduated on 30 April 2023.
131	2023.05.07	3rd generation members' athletic ability check! (First Half)	Every time new members enter, we do the athletic ability check!! This time too, they tried their hand at a variety of competitions. What are the potentials of third gens!? We'll also get a glimpse of the new aspects of the third gens and their relationships on location for the first time!? In addition, there will be a beach flag competition between seniors and third gens in the studio!!	-	-
132	2023.05.14	3rd generation members' athletic ability check! (Second Half)	In the second half, we will check the athletic ability of the 3rd generation members who are still unknown with the repeated side jump and high jump tests!! The high jump is a high-level contest!? Will anyone be able to surpass the record of the senior members!? In addition, a heated arm-wrestling duel in the studio!! Sakurazaka's strongest and weakest arms will be decided!?	-	-
133	2023.05.21	My brilliant award-winning journey show!!	A big list of all the brilliant awards the members have won during their school years! Ranked and announced in order of the number of awards!! Who is the member with an outstanding number of awards!? The glory of the past is revealed!! You must see the works and photos from that time!!	-	-
134	2023.05.28	3rd generation members' reaction check! (First Half)	Reaction Check at Fuji-Q, a gateway to success that senior members have also experienced!! This time, not only the 3rd generation members but also the 2nd generation members who hadn't been there yet will participate!? What kind of reactions will they show on the well-known roller coaster "FUJIYAMA"!?	-	-
135	2023.06.04	3rd generation members' reaction check! (Second Half)	The second half is a reaction check at Fuji-Q's most terrifying haunted house, the Senritsu Meikyu (戦慄迷宮, "Shivering Labyrinth")!! A lot of members cry because they are so scared!? The members are pushed into extreme conditions, and a side of them that you haven't seen yet comes out!?	-	-
136	2023.06.11	Go for it! Academy Actress! Sakurazaka46 acting check! (First Half)	To see the acting potential of the members, they are divided into several genres and their acting skills are checked!! For the themed situations, they were challenged to act in front of a green screen or with just their faces!! How good are the 3rd generation members whose skills are still unknown!? The members of the third generation are all laughing at their performances!?	-	The acrylic board (that was originally installed due to COVID-19) was completely removed from this recording session.
137	2023.06.18	Go for it! Academy Actress! Sakurazaka46 acting check! (Second Half)	We continue to check the members' acting skills!! In the second half, they try their hand at acting in five seconds according to a theme, and then a full-fledged ad-lib acting!! Don't miss the many great performances, from the talented to the unique!!	-	-
138	2023.06.25	Sakurazaka46 6th single hit prayer campaign!	All 1st and 2nd generation members are challenged to pray for the hit of the new song "Start over!", which will be released on 28 June!! Start over again and again until you succeed in the 10 missions you have been given = keep redoing!! This is the first hit prayer in which everyone is united in the challenge. Aim for everyone to succeed!! Will a miracle happen!?	-	-
139	2023.07.02	Selection for Shiga location shoot!	It's been three years since Takemoto's local presentation project for the Shiga location was decided... Finally, they got to go on location in Shiga, which they had longed for!! The winning member wins the right to go on location!! Who will go on location!?	-	-
140	2023.07.09	Sakurazaka46 academic ranking! (First Half)	In order to check the academic performance of the 3rd generation members, a simultaneous academic test was held for the first time in a long time!! Based on the ranking of the written test conducted beforehand, a quick quiz was held between the top and the bottom students to determine the Sakurazaka intelligent queen and the idiot queen!! Again, a number of unusual answers were given!! How good are the 3rd generation members!? A certain member's big breakthrough is suspected of cheating!?	-	-
141	2023.07.16	Sakurazaka46 academic ranking! (Second Half)	In the second half, a buzzer quiz by the top members of the academic test will determine the new intelligent queen!! And then the lower ranks of the academic test will be announced!? Who is in the lowest rank this time!? In the buzzer quiz to decide the new idiot queen, the stupid members can't stop giving unusual answers! Who will be crowned Sakurazaka's second intelligent queen and idiot queen?	-	-
142	2023.07.23	Quiz! You have got to know what ranking of seniors this is? (First Half)	The 3rd generation members, who have grown closer to their seniors through the tour, take a quiz to see how well they understand them!! The first and second term students have been placed in order of their ranking on a "certain thing", and the 3rd gens have to guess what kind of a ranking it is. If they fail to guess, they will be punished for the first time in their lives!!	Start over!	-
143	2023.07.30	Quiz! You have got to know what ranking of seniors this is? (Second Half)	We continue to look at the 1st and 2nd generation members in a certain ranking order while the 3rd gens guess, "What is the ranking order about?" What is in the ranking order this week!? The punishment games keep getting better and better! The third term students are going to put their bodies on the line!! Plus, there will be a studio live performance of the song "Seijaku no Bouryoku" by the 3rd generation members. Enjoy!	Seijaku no Bouryoku	-
144	2023.08.06	Hey listen! My dialect presentation! (First Half)	Many Sakurazaka members are from regional areas. So this time, the plan is to show off their regional dialects in a cute way on behalf of their prefectures!! The members show off their dialects in accordance with the situations in the theme!! The members' hearts can't stop wringing over the cute azatoi dialects!? The members' dialects, which you don't usually get to hear, is the focus of the show!!	Drone Senkaichu	-
145	2023.08.13	Hey listen! My dialect presentation! (Second Half)	The members from the region continue to show off more and more of the cute dialects of their hometowns!! This time the situations are 'getting angry' and 'apologising'. The cute dialects that keep coming out one after the other will cause a storm of full marks!? Who will win the grand prize!?	-	-
146	2023.08.20	I want to know more about 3rd gens! Family questionnaire! (First Half)	The annual project that everyone has been waiting for: A family survey of 3rd generation members! The family's tip-offs reveal an unknown side of the 3rd generation members!! Cute childhood treasure photos have also been released!! In addition, a top-secret video of one of the members will be shown for the first time, shocking all of us!? Don't miss it!!	-	-
147	2023.08.27	I want to know more about 3rd gens! Family questionnaire! (Second Half)	We continue to reveal more and more information that only the families know from the questionnaires answered by the families of the 3rd generation members! The daughters are getting a bit nervous about the recklessness of their families!? Lots of new charms and embarrassing episodes!! And what's the reason for the members' tears!?	-	-
148	2023.09.03	Takemoto Presents! Shiga Great Enjoyment Tour! (First Half)	It's been three years since Takemoto's presentation on the Shiga location was decided... Finally, the long-awaited Shiga location shoot has arrived!! Takemoto has prepared a lot for this day and she will take you on a tour of spots that will show you the charm of Shiga!! From activities to exquisite gourmet food, everyone is excited to be able to enjoy the summer in Shiga!!	-	MC Sawabe was absent in these two episodes due to a live broadcast of another programme. He appeared remotely during the show.
149	2023.09.10	Takemoto Presents! Shiga Great Enjoyment Tour! (Second Half)	The heated fish grabbing showdown!? Takemoto & Tsucchi show their true colours!? And in the second half, everyone will enjoy superb gourmet food!! A tasty 〇〇 showdown in Shiga for the sweet treats that people have to queue for!! Plus, a surprise appearance by a certain person reveals Takemoto's roots!?	-	MC Sawabe was absent in these two episodes due to a live broadcast of another programme. He appeared remotely during the show.
150	2023.09.17	If it's physical strength, I won't lose! Seniors vs. juniors battle! (First Half)	The senior members were overwhelmingly beaten by the 3rd gens in the recent academic test. If it wasn't for studying, they might be able to beat the 3rd generation members!? So this time, we will hold a reverse battle between the 3rd gens against the 1st and 2nd gens!! The senior members who can't lose, will they recover their honor!?	-	7th Single selection announcement.
151	2023.09.24	If it's physical strength, I won't lose! Seniors vs. juniors battle! (Second Half)	A physical battle of 1st and 2nd generation vs. 3rd generation in a competitive battle!! In the second half, a game of radish-removal and power force, a physical power showdown!! And the heated dodge ball determines the winner!? Who will win the reward of yakiniku!?	-	-
152	2023.10.01	2nd Hometown Presentation Tournament	Since the Shiga location was realised recently, the second local presentation competition was held to decide the next location, albeit being a little too early!! This time, the 3rd generation members presented local attractions at their hometown!! The presentation battle between Gunma vs Hiroshima vs Fukuoka, who will win the next local location!?	-	Shizuki Yamashita, who was due to present Kyoto, was absent due to health conditions.
153	2023.10.08	The 1st Sakurazaka46 Hair Arrangement Awards	In honour of 8 October being Hair Day, the most popular member hairstyles in the group are announced!! Awards of excellence are decided from the hairstyles nominated in each category by members' nominations!! A number of unusual hairstyles that are not often seen on the programme are ranked in the list!? Whose hairstyle is the most popular among the members!?	-	Hair Day in this context is a Japanese word play on the date's reading: tō (10) + hatsu (8) → 頭髪 which directly translates to "hair on the head". The aim is to make as many people as possible more aware of their scalp and hair, and to raise their spirits by checking their hair style. The anniversary was recognised and registered by the Japan Anniversary Association (日本記念日協会) in 2017 (Heisei 29).
154	2023.10.15	Sakurazaka46 7th Single "Shōnin Yokkyū" Hit Prayer Campaign	To pray for the hit of their seventh single 'Shōnin Yokkyū', which will be released on 18 October, front members Morita, Taniguchi and Yamashita try curling for the first time!! The three members take turns as throwers and sweepers, and they succeed if everyone can put a stone at the centre!! A very difficult challenge for beginners, but will they be able to achieve it!?	-	-
155	2023.10.22	Sakurazaka46's 1st world tour - Show us the behind the scenes!	Sakurazaka46 performed abroad for the first time this summer in Paris and Malaysia at the Japan Expo. For some of the members, it was their first time abroad. This time, we've released a lot of off-shots with memorable episodes from those trips!! Don't miss the members' high spirits abroad!!	Shōnin Yokkyū	-
156	2023.10.29	Spread your wings to the world! Team English Battle (First Half)	In order to become a more global group in the future, we aim to improve our English language skills and battle teams in games using English!! How good is the English of the members who have performed overseas? Onuma's comments caused a stir among the audience!!	-	-
157	2023.11.05	Spread your wings to the world! Team English Battle (Second Half)	We continue the English game battle between teams to improve their English skills!! In the second half, they have to talk to a foreigner in a practical situation!! Can the members listen and respond properly!? Will team 'Genius' lose their name!?	-	-
158	2023.11.12	Sakurazaka46 Sense Queen Tournament! (First Half)	Since the 3rd generation members are here, the Sense Queen Tournament is held again after 3 years!! Once again, we check the members' sense in various genres such as word sense, art and design!! Members come up with autobiography titles and unit names!! You may find the hidden talent of the third term students!?	-	-
159	2023.11.19	Sakurazaka46 Sense Queen Tournament! (Second Half)	Let's continue to check the members' sense!! A project and thumbnail that can aim for 1 million views are devised!! What kind of project will be born!? And another drawing challenge this time!! What is the drawing sense of the third generation who is participating in the competition for the first time!? Unexpected member will be the 3rd Queen of Sense!? Finally, a message from Habu, who is graduating from the group, to everyone.	-	Final message from Mizuho Habu, who announced her graduation.
160	2023.11.26	Returned! Kōsaka Marino's DEATH Game Season 2 (First Half)	The Death Game from Hell is back after a year's absence! This time, too, if you fail in the game, you will be humiliated by Marino-sama... The members who is sitting on the electric shock chair for the first time scream in agony!! And 'that' member makes a miracle!! Beware of new recruits!?	-	-
161	2023.12.03	Returned! Kōsaka Marino's DEATH Game Season 2 (Second Half)	In the second half, the remaining C block challenges Ise Takuan Cut Battle!! Those who lose will be punished with a nasty punishment. And if you win the next super-difficult ordeal, Marino-sama will finally descend!! What will she be wearing this time!? Which members will survive to the end!?	-	-
162	2023.12.10	Resolving 3rd gens' questions! Soko saku class meeting!	Senior members address the worries and doubts of 3rd generation members in the industry!! From reactions to preparedness, the senior members teach the troubled 3rd gens the methods they practice on recordings on a daily basis!! They give a lot of useful advice that will make you think, "Indeed!" !?	-	-
163	2023.12.17	Sakurazaka46 Hit Ranking 2023 (First Half)	Following on from last year, this year's list of the most popular things in the group is again presented in a ranking format!! With the addition of third-generation students, what kind of boom was going on this year!? What is Odakura's masterpiece 'motsunabe'? What kind of gymnastics was popular during the filming of the music video "Sukimakazeyo"!? And this time too, a new dressing room game is ranked!!	-	-
164	2023.12.24	Sakurazaka46 Hit Ranking 2023 (Second Half)	We're still looking back at the year's trends in Sakurazaka!! The second half ranks items, food and even Nakashima's expressions!? Sakura Meets members are also very active!! Please continue to keep up with the members' backstage antics!	-	-

=== 2024 ===
Episode	Original Broadcast Date	Episode Title	Synopsis	Studio Performance	Remarks
165	2024.01.07	Cool vs Burikko: New Year! Battle of the teams! (First Half)	The cool vs. the burikko team battle, led by the girls of the year Ōzono and Moriya!! The winning team gets a reward!! First, each leader faces off in their speciality!! To make Sawabe grin, they go all out with their burikko!! The first battle of the new year is about to get off to a flying start!!	-	-
166	2024.01.14	Cool vs Burikko: New Year! Battle of the teams! (Second Half)	Team Cool led by Ōzono and Team Burikko led by Moriya continue to clash!! The members show their true colours in an extremely difficult game where they have to guess the contents of a box by smell!? There's also a tablecloth pull challenge and a poker face showdown!! Can Team Burikko get back on track!?	-	-
167	2024.01.21	8 years of hard work! Celebrating Yui Kobayashi's graduation! (First Half)	To thank Kobayashi for her hardwork in leading the team over the years, we will fulfill "things Kobayashi wants to do" and "things the members wants to do with Kobayashi". Kobayashi appears in a very rare costume!! Looking back on the fellow members and their performance on the program, we held the last handshake event to meet the requests of 2nd generation members!! The last battle with Sawabe!?	-	8th single selection announcement
168	2024.01.28	8 years of hard work! Celebrating Yui Kobayashi's graduation! (Second Half)	In the second half, Kobayashi will have the first and last two-shot talk with the 3rd generation members!! What words will Kobayashi give them?! The graduation ceremony was filled with tears as the members' feelings overflowed. And a challenge will bring the show to a shocking end!? There is also a message from Kobayashi to the audience!	-	Final message from Yui Kobayashi, who announced her graduation.
169	2024.02.04	Sakurazaka46 2nd generation handsome guy audition	Now that Habu, the best looking guy in the group, has graduated, auditions are held to determine the next generation of handsome guys!! The 6 candidates who ranked high in the members' votes appear in men's clothes!! From cool and handsome scenes, we will show you the lines requested by the members!! Tonight, you won't be able to stop the excitement!?	-	-
170	2024.02.11	Sakurazaka46 camera roll beauty pageant	The members submit their best photos from their camera rolls and each member decides the best shot from the nominated photos!! The members are able to take pictures of each other's true faces and first-time photos, which are a must-see!! In the midst of many cute photos, Ōzono unexpectedly burst into tears!?	-	-
171	2024.02.18	Sakurazaka46 8th single hit prayer campaign	To pray for the hit of the 8th single "Ikutsu no Koro ni Modoritai no ka?" which will be released on the 21st February, front members Morita, Fujiyoshi and Yamazaki tried their hand at fishing! The aim is to catch the swordfish, which is said to bring good luck in this year's Chinese zodiac sign, the Year of the Dragon. The aim is to catch a huge Dragon-sized fish!! Can they catch it beautifully!?	-	-
172	2024.02.25	Digging into the 8th single Music Video	Sakurazaka46's music videos for every single have attracted a lot of attention. It's been a long time since we dug into the music video!! While watching the music video of the 8th single "Ikutsu no Koro ni Modoritai no ka?" and the coupling song "Abura wo Sase!" by BACKS members, you will receive attention points and behind-the-scenes stories from the members!! This makes watching the music video even more fun!?	-	-
173	2024.03.03	The youngest child image improvement project (First Half)	In fact, more than half of the members of Sakurazaka46 are the youngest children in their family. The youngest children often have the image of being unplanned and left to other's care? It's said to be so. This time, we are trying to improve the image of the youngest child! The members are divided into the eldest daughter, the middle child, and the youngest child, and Yamashita, the only child, asks for their opinions fairly!!	-	-
174	2024.03.10	The youngest child image improvement project (Second Half)	Continuing, the eldest, middle and youngest siblings clash in their respective position claims!! They also show how happy they are with their current sibling position!! Plus, they express their gratitude to their siblings! Some heart-warming episodes! Did the youngest child managed to improve their image...?	-	-
175	2024.03.17	Team Music Battle (First Half)	Members are divided into teams and face off in music-related games!! Try various music buzzer quizzes, including intro and reverse playback!! The questions are from a wide range of genres, and some members shine in their favourite genres!? Also, watch the members' piano skills!!	-	-
176	2024.03.24	Team Music Battle (Second Half)	In the second half, Masumoto's trumpet plays a big part in the music quiz!! The members' playlists are revealed in a big way!! A karaoke medley of their favourite songs, and a lot of fun!? Plus, the band delivers their thoughts on the members using familiar melodies.	-	-
177	2024.03.31	Bento Confession Championship	The other day, Moriya made a homemade lunch box and showed off her amazing cooking skills, and it exploded!! So this time, the members who say "I can do it too!" brings a homemade bento to suit their ideal confession situation!! The Bento Queen will be chosen from among them!! The members' ideal confessions have everyone laughing out loud!? How good are their cooking skills!?	-	-
178	2024.04.07	The 4th Wolf Queen Championship (First Half)	It's April, so the Wolf Queen Championship is held again after a while!! Can you spot the real Murai and Matono!! How good are the third generation members who are competing for the first time!? A new Wolf Queen is born!? You too will be fooled by the members' acting skills!?	-	-
179	2024.04.14	The 4th Wolf Queen Championship (Second Half)	The third-generation members try the popular trick game that seniors played in the past!! Can you successfully trick them while stepping on foot acupressure and spinning around in place!? And the members also play with celebrities they've just met for the first time with their best fake episodes!? Can you find out the one person who is telling the truth!?	-	-
180	2024.04.21	What Character Am I? Ranking (1)	For the 3rd generation members who still don't understand what kind of character they are, we took a questionnaire from the members to find out what kind of character they are and announced it!! In the first section, we delve deeper into the characters of Murayama, Taniguchi and Mukai!! An unexpected side of Murayama is revealed!? What ikemen episode does Taniguchi have!?	-	-
181	2024.04.28	Behind the Tour: Yuru Scoop Award	The members become journalists and they submit scoops between the members that were going on behind the scenes of the 4th tour!! Kosaka cries backstage!? Why is Takemoto dancing!? The scoops taken by the members are a must-see!! Enjoy!!	-	-
182	2024.05.05	What Character Am I? Ranking (2)	A project to find the characters of the 3rd generation members! The second installment will feature Ishimori, Nakashima, and Murai!! What kind of character do the members around them actually see? Ishimori's shocking nickname revealed. Murai has many secret stories!	-	-
183	2024.05.12	What Character Am I? Ranking (3)	We surveyed the members and dug deeper into what kind of characters the 3rd generation members are!! This time is Endo, Kojima, and Matono's turn!! Endo is a character as you could imagine, but also has a surprising side! What kind of youth slang do they use? What Matono did that surprised Ishimori! Please look forward to Murayama's polished overall review!	-	-
184	2024.05.19	Happy 38th day! Sawabe Fes 2024	May 19 is Sawabe's birthday, and the members went all out to celebrate him! We've prepared a gift to show our appreciation!! There will be a smile competition for Sawabe's favorite song, "Naze Koi wo Shite Konakattan Darou?"!! Furthermore, members confess their own opinions of Sawabe! There will also be many other activities such as game showdowns! Be sure to check out Fujiyoshi's rare MC performance!	-	9th single selection announcement
185	2024.05.25	Tell Us! Hobbies & Preferences Q&A Sesh	A survey was conducted to find out the tastes and preferences of the members, such as favorite TV shows and books they have recently purchased! Let's see the answers and guess who it belongs to! Various other unknown tastes and preferences, such as the live concerts they have been to and the comedians they are into, are also revealed!	-	-
186	2024.06.01	What Kinda Character I am? Ranking (4)	A series of in-depth character studies of 3rd gen members based on questionnaires from the members! The last two are Odakura and Yamashita!! Various tip-off episodes were received from the same gen. Mademoiselle Odakura has some unexpected aspects?! Yamashita can see people's auras!? Furthermore, we verified something else!!	-	-
187	2024.06.08	Let's-Protect-Seniors'-Faces Challenge Part 1	Inspired by Matono's recent comment that "I want to protect Morita's face," the 3rd gens will be taking on a game in which they must protect their seniors' faces!! If they fail the game, the senior members will get a pie in the face...! Morita in danger of getting her first face pie?! Also pay attention to the relationship between the 3rd gens and their seniors!	-	-
