= Keyakitte, Kakenai? =

Japanese variety show

- Title

Japanese name
- Kanji: 欅って、書けない?
- Literal meaning: Can you write "keyaki"?
- Genre: Variety show
- Created by: Yasushi Akimoto
- Presented by: Yū Sawabe; Teruyuki Tsuchida
- Starring: Keyakizaka46
- Narrated by: Umeka Shōji
- Country of origin: Japan
- Original language: Japanese
- No. of episodes: 253

Production
- Producers: Yoshio Konno; Hiroaki Sano; Makoto Nagao
- Running time: 30 min.

Original release
- Network: TV Tokyo
- Release: October 5, 2015 – October 12, 2020

Related
- Soko Magattara, Sakurazaka? Where is Nogizaka? Nogizaka Under Construction; Hiragana Oshi; Hinatazaka de Aimashō

Keyakitte, Kakenai? (欅って、書けない?; "Can you write 'keyaki'?") is a Japanese late night variety show starring Japanese idol group Keyakizaka46. It was hosted by Yū Sawabe and Teruyuki Tsuchida and aired every Sunday at 12:35 AM JST on TV Tokyo. After the group was rebranded into Sakurazaka46 in 2020, the show was cancelled and immediately renewed as Soko Magattara, Sakurazaka? (そこ曲がったら、櫻坂？; "If you turn there, is it Sakurazaka?").

== History ==
Keyakitte, Kakenai? was first aired on October 5, 2015, roughly two months after the formation of Keyakizaka46. The show was styled similar to Nogizaka46's weekly show, Nogizaka Under Construction.

Although primarily used for variety shows, Keyakitte, Kakenai? has also been used as a platform for various announcements, including introducing Neru Nagahama to the group, and announcing participating members of the upcoming single in a process called senbatsu (選抜制). The show has also had a variety of guest appearances, including Sunshine Ikezaki, Kazuya Kojima, Ayano Fukuda, and Ami Kikuchi. Keyakizaka46's subgroup, Hiragana Keyakizaka46, also occasionally appeared on the show until they received their own show, Hiragana Oshi.

Due to the COVID-19 pandemic, starting from the 17 May 2020 episode, the program transitioned from recording in a studio to recording remotely via Zoom.
