= Nagaredama =

2021 single by Sakurazaka46

- Type A cover

Single by Sakurazaka46

from the album As You Know?
- B-side: "Dead End" (all versions); "Utsukushiki Nervous" (regular); "Sonia" (Type A); "Jamaica Beer" (Type B); "On My Way" (Type C); "Mugon no Uchū" (Type D)
- Released: October 13, 2021
- Genre: J-pop
- Length: 4:16
- Label: Sony Music Japan
- Composer: Derek Turner
- Lyricist: Yasushi Akimoto

Sakurazaka46 singles chronology
"Ban" (2021)	"Nagaredama" (2021)	"Samidare yo" (2022)

Music video
- "Nagaredama" on YouTube

"Nagaredama" (流れ弾; "Stray bullet") is the third single by Japanese idol group Sakurazaka46 after their 2020 renaming. It was released on October 13, 2021. The title track features Hono Tamura as center. The music video was premiered on YouTube a month in advance of the single, on September 12, 2021. The single debuted atop the Oricon Singles Chart and the Billboard Japan Hot 100, selling over 375,000 copies in Japan in its first week of release.

== Background and release ==
In August 2021, "Nagaredama" was announced for release on October 13, 2021. The choreography formation was introduced the next day, during Sakurazaka46's variety show Soko Magattara, Sakurazaka?. Hono Tamura succeeds centre position in the choreography for the title song from Hikaru Morita, along with Risa Watanabe and Hikaru Morita replacing Karin Fujiyoshi and Ten Yamasaki from centre positions on coupling tracks respectively.

Rika Ozeki participated in the single after announcing her return from recuperating leave during the W-Keyaki Fes. 2021 in July. Yui Kobayashi took leave to recuperate, which was confirmed by the management committee in September 2021. Moreover, Akane Moriya and Rika Watanabe announced their departure from the group after the release of "Nagaredama".

Musician and columnist Azusa Ogiwara described the choreography as a bold, yet prudent change.

== Music video ==
The music video was directed by Kazuma Ikeda, who previously directed the video for "Silent Majority" during the Keyakizaka46 period.

== Track listing ==
Regular edition
No.	Title	Length
1.	"Nagaredama" (流れ弾)	4:16
2.	"Dead End"	4:33
3.	"Utsukushiki Nervous" (美しきNervous)	4:23
4.	"Nagaredama" (流れ弾; off vocal version)	4:16
5.	"Dead End" (off vocal version)	4:33
6.	"Utsukushiki Nervous" (美しきNervous; off vocal version)	4:23

Type A CD
No.	Title	Length
1.	"Nagaredama" (流れ弾)	4:16
2.	"Dead End"	4:33
3.	"Sonia" (ソニア)	4:27
4.	"Nagaredama" (流れ弾; off vocal version)	4:16
5.	"Dead End" (off vocal version)	4:33
6.	"Sonia" (ソニア; off vocal version)	4:27

Type B CD
No.	Title	Length
1.	"Nagaredama" (流れ弾)	4:16
2.	"Dead End"	4:33
3.	"Jamaica Beer" (ジャマイカビール)	3:22
4.	"Nagaredama" (流れ弾; off vocal version)	4:16
5.	"Dead End" (off vocal version)	4:33
6.	"Jamaica Beer" (ジャマイカビール; off vocal version)	3:22

Type C CD
No.	Title	Length
1.	"Nagaredama" (流れ弾)	4:16
2.	"Dead End"	4:33
3.	"On My Way"	3:48
4.	"Nagaredama" (流れ弾; off vocal version)	4:16
5.	"Dead End" (off vocal version)	4:33
6.	"On My Way" (off vocal version)	3:48

Type D CD
No.	Title	Length
1.	"Nagaredama" (流れ弾)	4:16
2.	"Dead End"	4:33
3.	"Mugon no Uchū" (無言の宇宙)	4:54
4.	"Nagaredama" (流れ弾; off vocal version)	4:16
5.	"Dead End" (off vocal version)	4:33
6.	"Mugon no Uchū" (無言の宇宙; off vocal version)	4:54

== Participating members ==
=== Nagaredama ===
3rd Row: Rei Ozono, Rina Matsuda, Minami Koike, Karin Fujiyoshi, Rena Moriya, Yui Takemoto

2nd Row: Yūka Sugai, Rika Watanabe, Risa Watanabe, Yui Kobayashi, Mizuho Habu

1st Row: Ten Yamasaki, Hono Tamura (centre), Hikaru Morita

== Charts ==
=== Weekly charts ===
Weekly chart performance for "Nagaredama"
Chart (2021)	Peak position
Japan (Japan Hot 100)	1
Japan (Oricon)	1

=== Year-end charts ===
Year-end chart performance for "Nagaredama"
Chart (2021)	Position
Japan (Oricon)	18

== Certifications ==
Certifications for "Nagaredama"
Region	Certification	Certified units/sales
Japan (RIAJ)	2× Platinum	500,000^{^}
^{^} Shipments figures based on certification alone.
