= Nogizaka Kōjichū =

Japanese late-night variety show

Japanese name
- Kanji: 乃木坂工事中
- Literal meaning: Nogizaka Under Construction
- Genre: Variety show
- Created by: Yasushi Akimoto
- Presented by: Bananaman (Osamu Shitara, Yūki Himura)
- Starring: Nogizaka46
- Narrated by: Kenji Sato; Yoshiyoshi Oedo
- Theme music composer: Seiichi Kyoda
- Opening theme: "Overture"
- Country of origin: Japan
- Original language: Japanese
- No. of episodes: 502

Production
- Camera setup: Multi-camera
- Running time: 25 minutes
- Production companies: TV Aichi; Kmax Co., Ltd.

Original release
- Network: TV Tokyo Network
- Release: April 21, 2015-present

Related
- Nogizakatte, Doko?; Keyakitte, Kakenai?; Soko Magattara, Sakurazaka?; Hiragana Oshi; Hinatazaka de Aimashō

Nogizaka Kōjichū (Japanese: 乃木坂工事中; transl. Nogizaka Under Construction) is a Japanese variety television show, hosted by Bananaman and starring the girl group Nogizaka46. It was first aired on April 21, 2015. It is produced by TV Aichi and broadcast by member stations of the TV Tokyo Network.

== Overview ==
Nogizaka Kōjichū is the successor to Nogizaka46's first regular terrestrial television program, Nogizakatte, Doko? (乃木坂って、どこ？; lit. 'Where is Nogizaka?') (October 3, 2011 – April 13, 2015), which was also hosted by Bananaman. The title of the show was created by Yasushi Akimoto, the general producer of Nogizaka46. (Note: Nogizaka46 was named after the SME Nogizaka building on Nogizaka street in Minato, Tokyo, where the final auditions for the group's founding members took place.)

On December 30, 2016, the show's first one-hour special episode was aired, featuring a joint year-end party with Keyakizaka46, whose television show Keyakitte, Kakenai? aired after this show's timeslot on TV Tokyo at the time. Subsequent one-hour special episodes have been aired on December 26, 2017, January 9, 2018, and January 8, 2019.

Starting with the May 17, 2021 episode, each episode has been made available after the terrestrial broadcast on the YouTube channel Nogizaka Haishinchū (乃木坂配信中; lit. 'Nogizaka Streaming Now'), which was newly established on May 6. Nikkan Sports reported that it is unusual for a terrestrial television program to be officially distributed for free on YouTube.

Due to their good relationship in the show, the Bananaman duo have become known as the "official older brothers" (公式お兄ちゃん) of Nogizaka46. Yūki Himura has also taken the lead dancer position in Nogizaka46's live dance performances wearing replicas of the group's costumes as his female character Himuko (ヒム子), such as during the 2017 TV Tokyo Music Festival and the 2017 Midsummer National Tour at the Meiji Jingu Stadium. The preparation and performances were documented in the episodes aired on July 16 and 23, 2017.

== Reception ==
Business Journal reported in 2021 that while TV Tokyo generally has the lowest viewership ratings among Kantō region broadcasters, its late Sunday night block, which airs three Sakamichi Series variety shows (Nogizaka Kōjichū, Soko Magattara, Sakurazaka?, and Hinatazaka de Aimashō) back-to-back, has "astonishingly high" household viewership ratings at around 1.5–2 percent comparable to larger stations such as Nippon TV. It also noted the high number of time shifted (recorded) viewing, which indicated that viewers were actively watching the shows.
