= Haraichi =

Japanese comedy duo

- Haraichi (ハライチ)
- Employer: Watanabe Entertainment

Comedy career
- Years active: 2005–
- Genre: Manzai
- Members: Yū Sawabe (Tsukkomi); Yūki Iwai (Boke)

Notes
- Same year/generation as: Satoshi Mukai (Panther); Edo Harumi; Barbie; Sunshine Ikezaki; Chocolate Planet

Haraichi (ハライチ, Haraichi) is a Japanese comedy duo (kombi) consisting of Yū Sawabe (澤部佑) and Yūki Iwai (岩井勇気). They have featured in a number of Japanese television shows. They are employed by Watanabe Entertainment, a talent agency based in Tokyo.

== Beginning ==
Sawabe and Iwai have known each other since pre-school. They formed Haraichi in 2005, named after the local neighborhood of Haraichi (原市) in their hometown of Ageo, Saitama.

== Members ==
- Yū Sawabe (澤部佑) Born July 31, 1986, in Ageo, Saitama. Plays the tsukkomi.
- Yūki Iwai (岩井勇気) Born May 19, 1986, in Ageo, Saitama. Plays the boke and writes all their material.

== Achievements ==
- M-1 Grand Prix finalist, 5th place (2009)
- M-1 Grand Prix finalist, 7th place (2010)
- M-1 Grand Prix finalist, 9th place (2015)
- M-1 Grand Prix finalist, 6th place (2016)

== Media ==
=== Television (Variety) ===
==== Sawabe ====
Current Regular

- Aiba Manabu (相葉マナブ) -- TV Asahi (4/21/2013-)
- Knight Scoop (探偵!ナイトスクープ) -- ABCTV (10/11/2013-)
- Hayashi-sensei no Hatsumimigaku (林先生が驚く初耳学!) -- MBS TV (4/12/2015-)
- Soko Magattara, Sakurazaka? (そこ曲がったら、櫻坂?) -- TV Tokyo (10/18/2020-) MC
- Naming Variety - Nihonjin no Namae! (ネーミングバラエティー 日本人のおなまえっ!) -- NHK General TV (4/6/2017-)
- Nariyuki Kaidotabi (なりゆき街道旅) -- Fuji TV (4/1/2018-) MC
- Aberē on'na 〜 kurabeta garu on'na-tachi 〜 (アベレー女 〜比べたがるオンナたち〜) (2026, Fuji TV) co-host with Timelesz's Fuma Kikuchi

Current Irregular

- Tokoton Horisagetai! Ikimono ni Thank you!! (トコトン掘り下げ隊!生き物にサンキュー!!) -- Tokyo Broadcasting System Television
- NBA Basketball (NBA バスケットボール) -- WOWOW

==== Iwai ====
Current Regular

- Oha Suta (おはスタ) -- TV Tokyo (4/2015-) Mondays
- HOT WAVE Neppa (HOT WAVE 熱波) -- Television Saitama (4/7/2016-)
- Hinekure 3 (ひねくれ3) -- TV Tokyo (4/6/2019-) MC

Former Irregular

- Keyakitte, Kakenai? (欅って、書けない?) -- TV Tokyo (11/30/2015-10/12/2020)

==== Sawabe and Iwai (Haraichi) ====
Current regular

- Poka Poka (ぽかぽか) (Fuji TV) Host, performer
- Odo Odo x Hara Hara (オドオド×ハラハラ) (Fuji TV, 2023)

Current irregular

- Tamori Club (タモリ俱楽部) -- TV Asahi
