= Nobody's Fault (Sakurazaka46 song) =

2020 single by Sakurazaka46

- Regular edition cover

Single by Sakurazaka46

from the album As You Know?
- B-side: "Naze Koi o Shite Konakattan darō?"; "Hanshinhangi" (Type-A); "Plastic Regret" (Type-B); "Saishū no Chikatetsu ni Notte" (Type-C); "Buddies" (Type-D); "Blue Moon Kiss" (Regular)
- Released: December 9, 2020
- Genre: J-pop
- Length: 4:29
- Label: Sony Music
- Composer(s): Derek Turner
- Lyricist(s): Yasushi Akimoto
- Producer(s): Yasushi Akimoto (exec.)

Sakurazaka46 singles chronology
"Dare ga Sono Kane o Narasu no ka?" (2020)	"Nobody's Fault" (2020)	"Ban" (2021)

Music video
- "Nobody's Fault" on YouTube

"Nobody's Fault" (stylized in sentence case) is the first single from Japanese idol group Sakurazaka46 after their renaming and repositioning from Keyakizaka46. It was released on December 9, 2020. The title track features Hikaru Morita as center. The single debuted atop the Oricon Singles Chart and the Billboard Japan Hot 100, selling over 408,000 copies in Japan in its first week of release.

== Background and release ==
"Nobody's Fault" was premiered during Keyakizaka46's Last Live KEYAKIZAKA46 Live Online, but with YOU! on October 13, 2020. Hikaru Morita was featured as centre position in the choreography for the title song, making her the first second-generation member to hold such position after the departure of Yurina Hirate, the most renowned member of the group. Karin Fujiyoshi and Ten Yamasaki also took center positions in coupling tracks as the management committee set forth, made it technically a trio-center. The formation was announced on the Sakurazaka46 starring variety show Soko Magattara, Sakurazaka? prior to the premiere. There is no "unit song" and "solo song" on this release though a three-row formation was kept. Apart from the third-row members being rotated in different songs, the first and second row members, named "Sakura Eight" (櫻エイト), were featured in all tracks.

== Music video ==
The music video for the title song was taken in Sadogashima, west of Niigata Prefecture. It was directed by Shohei Goto, also known as the director of Mizkan, Shiseido, Sony and Uniqlo commercials. It reached 1 million views in 2 days after released on YouTube.

== Track listing ==
All lyrics are written by Yasushi Akimoto, except off vocal version track.

=== Type-A ===
Credits adapted from album liner notes.

CD
No.	Title	Music	Arrangement	Length
1.	"Nobody's Fault"	Derek Turner	Yūichi "Masa" Nonaka	4:29
2.	"Naze Koi o Shite Konakattan darō?" (なぜ 恋をして来なかったんだろう?)	SoichiroK; Nozomu.S	Soulife	3:29
3.	"Hanshinhangi" (半信半疑)	Haruyuki	Haruyuki; hruk.	4:52
4.	"Nobody's Fault" (off vocal version)	Turner	Masa	4:29
5.	"Naze Koi o Shite Konakattan darō?" (off vocal version)	SoichiroK; Nozomu.S	Soulife	3:29
6.	"Hanshinhangi" (off vocal version)	Haruyuki	Haruyuki; hruk.	4:51
Total length:				25:39

Blu-ray
No.	Title	Director(s)	Length
1.	"Nobody's Fault" (music video)	Shohei Goto	4:24
2.	"Overture" (KEYAKIZAKA46 Live Online, but with YOU!: Part I)		1:29
3.	"Taiyō wa Miageru Hito o Erabanai" (KEYAKIZAKA46 Live Online, but with YOU!: Part I)		4:36
4.	"Eccentric" (KEYAKIZAKA46 Live Online, but with YOU!: Part I)		4:29
5.	"Tōkyō Tower wa Doko Kara Mieru?" (KEYAKIZAKA46 Live Online, but with YOU!: Part I)		4:12
6.	"Student Dance" (KEYAKIZAKA46 Live Online, but with YOU!: Part I)		4:15
7.	"Nobody" (KEYAKIZAKA46 Live Online, but with YOU!: Part I)		3:43
8.	"Ambivalent" (KEYAKIZAKA46 Live Online, but with YOU!: Part I)		4:30
Total length:			31:38

=== Type-B ===
Credits adapted from album liner notes.

CD
No.	Title	Music	Arrangement	Length
1.	"Nobody's Fault"	Turner	Masa	4:29
2.	"Naze Koi o Shite Konakattan darō?"	SoichiroK; Nozomu.S	Soulife	3:29
3.	"Plastic Regret"	Ryuta Sakamoto	Sakamoto	3:41
4.	"Nobody's Fault" (off vocal version)	Turner	Masa	4:29
5.	"Naze Koi o Shite Konakattan darō?" (off vocal version)	SoichiroK; Nozomu.S	Soulife	3:29
6.	"Plastic Regret" (off vocal version)	Sakamoto	Sakamoto	3:40
Total length:				23:17

Blu-ray
No.	Title	Director(s)	Length
1.	"Nobody's Fault" (music video)	Goto	4:24
2.	"Otona wa Shinjitekurenai" (KEYAKIZAKA46 Live Online, but with YOU!: Part II)		3:31
3.	"Hiraishin" (KEYAKIZAKA46 Live Online, but with YOU!: Part II)		4:00
4.	"Kaze ni Fukarete mo" (KEYAKIZAKA46 Live Online, but with YOU!: Part II)		4:29
5.	"Glass wo Ware!" (KEYAKIZAKA46 Live Online, but with YOU!: Part II)		3:42
6.	"Dare ga Sono Kane o Narasu no ka?" (KEYAKIZAKA46 Live Online, but with YOU!: Part II)		4:58
Total length:			24:12

=== Type-C ===
Credits adapted from album liner notes.

CD
No.	Title	Music	Arrangement	Length
1.	"Nobody's Fault"	Turner	Masa	4:29
2.	"Naze Koi o Shite Konakattan darō?"	SoichiroK; Nozomu.S	Soulife	3:29
3.	"Saishū no Chikatetsu ni Notte" (最終の地下鉄に乗って)	Aokado	Aokado	3:41
4.	"Nobody's Fault" (off vocal version)	Turner	Masa	4:29
5.	"Naze Koi o Shite Konakattan darō?" (off vocal version)	SoichiroK; Nozomu.S	Soulife	3:29
6.	"Saishū no Chikatetsu ni Notte" (off vocal version)	Aokado	Aokado	3:40
Total length:				25:25

Blu-ray
No.	Title	Director(s)	Length
1.	"Nobody's Fault" (music video)	Goto	4:24
2.	"Naze Koi o Shite Konakattan darō?" (music video)	Hidejin Kato	3:24
3.	"Rina Inoue" (井上梨名)	Hiroki Sugiyama
4.	"Yui Takamoto" (武元唯衣)	Mitsuaki Matsunaga
5.	"Karin Fujiyoshi" (藤吉夏鈴)	Keisuke Tamura
6.	"Riko Matsudaira" (松平璃子)	Yujirō Hashimoto
7.	"Ten Yamasaki" (山﨑天)	Katsuaki Ishii
8.	"Rei Ōzono" (大園玲)	Kei Asahina
9.	"Marino Kōsaka" (幸阪茉里乃)	Yoshihiro Nagata
10.	"Rena Moriya" (守屋麗奈)	Tsugumi Matsunaga

=== Type-D ===
Credits adapted from album liner notes.

CD
No.	Title	Music	Arrangement	Length
1.	"Nobody's Fault"	Turner	Masa	4:29
2.	"Naze Koi o Shite Konakattan darō?"	SoichiroK; Nozomu.S	Soulife	3:29
3.	"Buddies"	Daisuke Nakamura	Nakamura	5:02
4.	"Nobody's Fault" (off vocal version)	Turner	Masa	4:29
5.	"Naze Koi o Shite Konakattan darō?" (off vocal version)	SoichiroK; Nozomu.S	Soulife	3:29
6.	"Buddies" (off vocal version)	Aokado	Aokado	5:00
Total length:				25:58

Blu-ray
No.	Title	Director(s)	Length
1.	"Nobody's Fault" (music video)	Goto	4:24
2.	"Buddies" (music video)	Yudai Maruyama	3:24
3.	"Yumiko Seki" (関有美子)	Takuya Ohata
4.	"Hono Tamura" (田村保乃)
5.	"Rina Matsuda" (松田里奈)
6.	"Hikaru Morita" (森田ひかる)	Raita Kuramoto
7.	"Hikari Endō" (遠藤光莉)
8.	"Akiho Onuma" (大沼晶保)
9.	"Kira Masumoto" (増本綺良)	Shōkei Katō

=== Regular edition ===
Credits adapted from album liner notes.

CD
No.	Title	Music	Arrangement	Length
1.	"Nobody's Fault"	Turner	Masa	4:29
2.	"Naze Koi o Shite Konakattan darō?"	SoichiroK; Nozomu.S	Soulife	3:29
3.	"Blue Moon Kiss" (ブルームーンキス)	Yoichiro Nomura	Nomura	5:22
4.	"Nobody's Fault" (off vocal version)	Turner	Masa	4:29
5.	"Naze Koi o Shite Konakattan darō?" (off vocal version)	SoichiroK; Nozomu.S	Soulife	3:29
6.	"Blue Moon Kiss" (off vocal version)	Nomura	Nomura	5:22
Total length:				26:40

=== Special edition ===
Credits adapted from Apple Music

Digital download, streaming
No.	Title	Music	Arrangement	Length
1.	"Nobody's Fault"	Turner	Masa	4:29
2.	"Naze Koi o Shite Konakattan darō?"	SoichiroK; Nozomu.S	Soulife	3:29
3.	"Hanshinhangi"	Haruyuki	Haruyuki; hruk.	4:52
4.	"Plastic Regret"	Sakamoto	Sakamoto	3:41
5.	"Saishū no Chikatetsu ni Notte"	Aokado	Aokado	3:41
6.	"Buddies"	Nakamura	Nakamura	5:02
7.	"Blue Moon Kiss"	Nomura	Nomura	5:22
Total length:				31:40

== Participating members ==
=== Nobody’s Fault ===
3rd row: Yui Takemoto, Rei Ozono, Akane Moriya, Rina Matsuda, Mizuho Habu

2nd row: Yūka Sugai, Karin Fujiyoshi, Minami Koike, Ten Yamasaki, Hono Tamura

1st row: Yui Kobayashi, Hikaru Morita (centre), Risa Watanabe

=== Naze Koi wo Shite Konakattan darou? ===
3rd row: Rina Inoue, Marino Kousaka, Aoi Harada, Rika Watanabe, Kira Masumoto, Yumiko Seki

2nd row: Yuuka Sugai, Hikaru Morita, Minami Koike, Ten Yamasaki, Hono Tamura

1st row: Yui Kobayashi, Karin Fujiyoshi (centre), Risa Watanabe

=== Hanshinhangi ===
3rd row: Hikari Endo, Rina Uemura, Akiho Onuma, Rena Moriya, Riko Matsudaira, Fuyuka Saito

2nd row: Yuuka Sugai, Karin Fujiyoshi, Minami Koike, Hikaru Morita, Hono Tamura

1st row: Yui Kobayashi, Ten Yamasaki (centre), Risa Watanabe

=== Plastic Regret ===
3rd row: Rina Inoue, Marino Kousaka, Aoi Harada, Rika Watanabe, Kira Masumoto, Yumiko Seki

2nd row: Yuuka Sugai, Hikaru Morita, Minami Koike, Ten Yamasaki, Hono Tamura

1st row: Yui Kobayashi, Karin Fujiyoshi (centre), Risa Watanabe

=== Saishuu no Chikatetsu ni Notte ===
3rd row: Yui Takemoto, Rei Ozono, Akane Moriya, Rina Matsuda, Mizuho Habu

2nd row: Yūka Sugai, Karin Fujiyoshi, Minami Koike, Ten Yamasaki, Hono Tamura

1st row: Yui Kobayashi, Hikaru Morita (centre), Risa Watanabe

=== Buddies ===
3rd row: Hikari Endo, Rina Uemura, Akiho Onuma, Rena Moriya, Riko Matsudaira, Fuyuka Saito

2nd row: Yuuka Sugai, Karin Fujiyoshi, Minami Koike, Hikaru Morita, Hono Tamura

1st row: Yui Kobayashi, Ten Yamasaki (centre), Risa Watanabe

=== Blue moon kiss ===
3rd row: Yui Takemoto, Rei Ozono, Akane Moriya, Rina Matsuda, Mizuho Habu

2nd row: Yūka Sugai, Karin Fujiyoshi, Minami Koike, Ten Yamasaki, Hono Tamura

1st row: Yui Kobayashi, Hikaru Morita (centre), Risa Watanabe

== Charts ==
=== Weekly charts ===
Chart (2020)	Peak position	First week sales
Japan (Oricon)	1	409,000
Japan Hot 100 (Billboard)	1	414,024

=== Year-end charts ===
Chart (2020)	Position
Japan (Oricon)	12
