= Ban (song) =

2021 single by Sakurazaka46

- Regular edition cover

Single by Sakurazaka46

from the album As You Know?
- B-side: "Guuzen no Kotae" (all versions); "Sakurazaka no Uta" (regular); "Sore ga Ai Nano ne" (Type A); "Kimi to Boku to Sentakumono" (Type B); "Microscope" (Type C); "Omotta Yori Mo Sabishikunai" (Type D)
- Released: April 14, 2021
- Genre: J-pop
- Length: 3:39
- Label: Sony Music Japan
- Composers: A-Note; S-Tone
- Lyricist: Yasushi Akimoto

Sakurazaka46 singles chronology
"Nobody's Fault" (2021)	"Ban" (2021)	"Nagaredama" (2021)

Music video
- "Ban" on YouTube

"Ban" is the second single by Japanese idol group Sakurazaka46 after their 2020 renaming. It was released on April 14, 2021. The title track features Hikaru Morita as center. The music video was premiered on YouTube on March 17, 2021.

== Track listing ==
Regular edition
No.	Title	Length
1.	"Ban"	3:39
2.	"Guuzen no Kotae" (偶然の答え)	4:14
3.	"Sakurazaka no Uta" (櫻坂の詩)	4:43
4.	"Ban" (off vocal version)	3:39
5.	"Guuzen no Kotae" (偶然の答え; off vocal version)	4:14
6.	"Sakurazaka no Uta" (櫻坂の詩; off vocal version)	4:41

Type A CD
No.	Title	Length
1.	"Ban"	3:39
2.	"Guuzen no Kotae" (偶然の答え)	4:14
3.	"Sore ga Ai Nano ne" (それが愛なのね)	4:25
4.	"Ban" (off vocal version)	3:39
5.	"Guuzen no Kotae" (偶然の答え; off vocal version)	4:14
6.	"Sore ga Ai Nano ne" (それが愛なのね; off vocal version)	4:24

Type B CD
No.	Title	Length
1.	"Ban"	3:39
2.	"Guuzen no Kotae" (偶然の答え)	4:14
3.	"Kimi to Boku to Sentakumono" (君と僕と洗濯物)	3:44
4.	"Ban" (off vocal version)	3:39
5.	"Guuzen no Kotae" (偶然の答え; off vocal version)	4:14
6.	"Kimi to Boku to Sentakumono" (君と僕と洗濯物; off vocal version)	3:43

Type C CD
No.	Title	Length
1.	"Ban"	3:39
2.	"Guuzen no Kotae" (偶然の答え)	4:14
3.	"Microscope"	3:49
4.	"Ban" (off vocal version)	3:39
5.	"Guuzen no Kotae" (偶然の答え; off vocal version)	4:14
6.	"Microscope" (off vocal version)	3:48

Type D CD
No.	Title	Length
1.	"Ban"	3:39
2.	"Guuzen no Kotae" (偶然の答え)	4:14
3.	"Omotta Yori Mo Sabishikunai" (思ったよりも寂しくない)	4:20
4.	"Ban" (off vocal version)	3:39
5.	"Guuzen no Kotae" (偶然の答え; off vocal version)	4:14
6.	"Omotta Yori Mo Sabishikunai" (思ったよりも寂しくない; off vocal version)	4:19

== Participating members ==
=== Ban ===
- 3rd Row: Rei Ozono, Rina Inoue, Rina Matsuda, Rena Moriya, Rika Watanabe, Mizuho Habu
- 2nd Row: Hono Tamura, Ten Yamasaki, Minami Koike, Karin Fujiyoshi, Yūka Sugai
- 1st Row: Yui Kobayashi, Hikaru Morita (centre), Risa Watanabe

=== Guuzen no Kotae ===
- 3rd row: Rika Ozeki, Yumiko Seki, Aoi Harada, Rina Uemura, Yui Takemoto
- 2nd Row: Hono Tamura, Ten Yamasaki, Minami Koike, Hikaru Morita, Yūka Sugai
- 1st Row: Yui Kobayashi, Karin Fujiyoshi (centre), Risa Watanabe

=== Sore ga Ai Nano ne ===
- 3rd row: Akiho Onuma, Marino Kousaka, Fuyuka Saito, Kira Masumoto, Akane Moriya, Hikari Endo
- 2nd Row: Hono Tamura, Hikari Morita, Minami Koike, Karin Fujiyoshi, Yūka Sugai
- 1st Row: Yui Kobayashi, Ten Yamasaki (centre), Risa Watanabe

=== Kimi to Boku to Sentakumono ===
- 3rd Row: Rei Ozono, Rina Inoue, Rina Matsuda, Rena Moriya, Rika Watanabe, Mizuho Habu
- 2nd Row: Hono Tamura, Ten Yamasaki, Minami Koike, Karin Fujiyoshi, Yūka Sugai
- 1st Row: Yui Kobayashi, Hikaru Morita (centre), Risa Watanabe

=== Microscope ===
- 3rd row: Rika Ozeki, Yumiko Seki, Aoi Harada, Rina Uemura, Yui Takemoto
- 2nd Row: Hono Tamura, Ten Yamasaki, Minami Koike, Hikaru Morita, Yūka Sugai
- 1st Row: Yui Kobayashi, Karin Fujiyoshi (centre), Risa Watanabe

=== Omotta Yori Mo Sabishikunai ===
- 3rd row: Akiho Onuma, Marino Kousaka, Fuyuka Saito, Akane Moriya, Hikari Endo
- 2nd Row: Hono Tamura, Hikari Morita, Minami Koike, Karin Fujiyoshi, Yūka Sugai
- 1st Row: Yui Kobayashi, Ten Yamasaki (centre), Risa Watanabe

=== Sakurazaka no Uta ===
- 1st Generation: Rina Uemura, Rika Ozeki, Minami Koike, Yui Kobayashi, Fuyuka Saito, Yūka Sugai, Mizuho Habu, Aoi Harada, Akane Moriya, Rika Watanabe, Risa Watanabe
- 2nd Generation: Rina Inoue, Hikari Endo, Rei Ozono, Akiho Onuma, Marino Kousaka, Yumiko Seki, Yui Takemoto, Hono Tamura, Karin Fujiyoshi, Kira Masumoto, Rina Matsuda, Hikaru Morita, Rena Moriya, Ten Yamasaki

== Charts ==
=== Weekly charts ===
Weekly chart performance for "Ban"
Chart (2021)	Peak position
Japan (Japan Hot 100)	1
Japan (Oricon)	1

=== Year-end charts ===
Year-end chart performance for "Ban"
Chart (2021)	Position
Japan (Oricon)	16
