= Hiragana Oshi =

Japanese variety show

Japanese name
- Kanji: ひらがな推し
- Literal meaning: Rooting for Hiragana
- Genre: Variety show
- Created by: Yasushi Akimoto
- Presented by: Audrey (Toshiaki Kasuga, Masayasu Wakabayashi)
- Starring: Hiragana Keyakizaka46
- Narrated by: Yōhei Azakami
- Country of origin: Japan
- Original language: Japanese
- No. of episodes: 50

Production
- Running time: 30 min.

Original release
- Network: TV Tokyo
- Release: April 9, 2018 – April 1, 2019

Related
- Where is Nogizaka? Nogizaka Under Construction; Keyakitte, Kakenai? Soko Magattara, Sakurazaka? Hinatazaka de Aimashō

Hiragana Oshi (Japanese: ひらがな推し) is a Japanese late night variety show starring Japanese idol group Hiragana Keyakizaka46. It was hosted by the comedy duo Audrey and aired every Monday at 1:05 AM JST on TV Tokyo. After the group was rebranded to Hinatazaka46, the show was succeeded by Hinatazaka de Aimashō.

== History ==
As a subgroup of Keyakizaka46, Hiragana Keyakizaka46 members initially appeared on Keyakitte, Kakenai? with the main group members. In March 2018, a new show for the subgroup was announced. After episode 5, a song performance was included at the end of the show.

The last episode aired on April 1, 2019, as Hiragana Keyakizaka46 changed their name to Hinatazaka46. The show was succeeded by Hinatazaka de Aimashō, which is identical except for the name.

In March 2021, the first set of Hiragana Oshi DVD and Blu-ray was released, consisting of five editions. Instead of including episodes in chronological order, each edition was named after a first generation Hinatazaka46 member and included episodes which featured notable scenes, including deleted scenes, of that member; the same member would also lead the discussion segment in each edition. The second set of five editions, named after second generation Hinatazaka46 members and Hinano Kamimura (the only third generation member who ever appeared in the show), was released in January 2022.

== Production ==
The Hiragana Keyakizaka46 management intended to create a program with the same atmosphere as Nogizakatte, Doko? (predecessor to Nogizaka Kōjichū) for the group, and producer Makoto Nagao, who has also been the producer of Nogizaka46 and Keyakizaka46's variety shows, aimed for the shows to become a "catalog" for the group and lead to various outside jobs. The reason for using Audrey as MC was to create a similar relationship between the hosts and the members as in Nogizaka Kōjichū and Keyakitte, Kakenai?, so that it would look good if a joint special episode was to be produced. They also had the reputation of not being good at working with young girls, partly because they had attended a boys' school during their youth, which was thought to be able to form an interesting dynamic, and many staff members had wanted to work with them. Despite their busy schedules, they agreed almost immediately.

The production staff appreciated that many of the members were "cheerful and positive", and wrote detailed answers in the production questionnaires and asked questions after the recording. In the early days of the show, the Audrey duo did come across as being shy around a large group of girls, but Wakabayashi managed to bring out the members' individual characteristics and the "groove" of the show steadily grew.

Nagao noted that Audrey and the production staff were comparable to boys' school students, while the Hiragana Keyakizaka46 members were like neighboring girls' school students who would organize joint events with them, creating a relationship that worked well. Director Katsutoshi Shirano commented that after the two-part episode titled "Let's Get Closer to Audrey!", the members and Audrey actually became closer and the members became easier to work with.

== Reception ==
Pop culture writer Hiko noted that the production staff's love for Audrey was "extraordinary", and that Hiragana Oshi could be seen as a "redo" of Audrey's youth at a boys' school. He agreed that the members' excitement and "overflowing girls' school spirit" successfully created an atmosphere of "encounter between an all-boys school and an all-girls school", which became the core of Hiragana Oshi.

Hiko particularly noted episode 43, in which Audrey introduced the shōnen manga Kinnikuman to the members, as the "pinnacle of boys' school enthusiasm". It was mentioned on Twitter by Takashi Shimada, one of the two Kinnikuman authors who share the pen name Yudetamago, and was featured on the obi for the 66th volume of the manga released on March 7, 2019. Konoka Matsuda, who was selected as the episode's MVP, was interviewed in the May 20, 2019 issue of Weekly Playboy as "an idol who knows too much about Kinnikuman".

Real Sound commented that Hiragana Keyakizaka46's variety skills "blossomed" in the show and that the group's encounter with the Audrey duo was, in member Shiho Katō's words, "the work of fate".

== Home media ==
=== First set (March 2021) ===
Featured member	Title	Episodes
Shiho Katō	"Toshi-chan and Her Merry Friends" Edition (「としちゃんと愉快な仲間たち」編)	#10–11 Hiragana Keyakizaka46 Debut Album Hit Prayer!; #20–21 Find the Future Akutagawa Prize Winners! The King of Writing Contest; #44 Solving Your Problems! Snack Mao [Night 13 / 14 / 15]
Kyōko Saitō	"Kyoko-san, What Have You Done?" (Note: A quote by Manamo Miyata from episode 30) Edition (「京子さん、何してんですか?」編)	#22–23 Hiragana Keyakizaka46 Academic Test; #29–30 Team Competition! Relay Cooking in 3 Minutes!; #31 Hiragana Keyakizaka46 Artistic Ability Museum
Kumi Sasaki	"Birth of Hinata's Variety Queen" Edition (「日向のバラエティ女王誕生」編)	#16–17 Doki! Hiragana Keyakizaka46's All-out Hilarious Comedy Contest; #25–27 Hiragana Keyakizaka46 Miscellaneous Ranking
Mirei Sasaki	"I'll Fire The Bread Gun" (Note: A quote by Sasaki from episode 13) Edition (「パンの鉄砲を撃ちますよ」編)	#7–8 Challenge Kasuga! Special Skill Battle!; #12 Hiragana Keyakizaka46 Young vs. Adult Variety Game Battle!; #13 Hiragana Keyakizaka46's The Class I Want to Do The Most in the World
Ayaka Takamoto	"Otake Became My Nickname" (Note: Discussed in episode 2) Edition (「あだ名がおたけになりました」編)	#1–2 Kasuga Presents! Introduction by Member Profile Memorization! (Parts 1–2); #28 Solving Your Problems! Snack Mao [Night 4 / 5 / 6]; #33–34 Let's Get Closer to Audrey

=== Second set (January 2022) ===
Featured member	Title	Episodes
Miku Kanemura	"You Have to Support The First-caught Skipjack Tuna" (Note: A combination of Kanemura's catchphrase and a quote by her from episode 39) Edition (『初ガツオを推すしかない編』)	#3 Kasuga Presents! Introduction by Member Profile Memorization! (Part 3); #14–15 Bring Out More Charm! Family Questionnaire; #38 New Year! Hiragana Keyakizaka46! Who Will Be The Luckiest in 2019?; #39–40 Adults vs. Minors, Maturity Showdown!
Akari Nibu	"'Is There Someone You Like?' 'It's Nibu'" (Note: An exchange between Nibu and Kasuga's characters in their skit in episode 37) Edition (『好きな人いるの？ニブだよ編』)	#9 Fantasy Future History (Tomita, Nibu, Kageyama, Iguchi); #24 Solving Your Problems! Opening of Snack Mao! [Night 1 / 2 / 3]; #36–37 Hiragana Keyakizaka46 Burikko Championship!; #47 Solving Your Problems! Snack Mao [Night 16 / 17 / Final]
Konoka Matsuda	"Birth of A Heavy Little Toos" (Note: Audrey fandom name) Edition (『ヘビーリトルトゥース誕生編』)	#35 Solving Your Problems! Snack Mao [Night 10 / 11 / 12]; #41 Hiragana Members' First Project Presentation: Let's All Make it a Success!; #43 "I Won't Even Need the Push from my Farts!" Let's Learn About Kinnikuman!; #45–46 Konoka Matsuda Presents: Hiragana Music Sports Competition
Miho Watanabe	"The Raging Detonator Created by Saitama and Kasuga" Edition (『埼玉と春日が生んだ怒涛の起爆剤編』)	#4 Kasuga Presents: Introduction by Member Profile Memorization! (Part 4); #5–6 Hiragana Keyakizaka46 2nd Anniversary, Unannounced Bag Check!; #18–19 1st vs. 2nd Generation Members Athletic Ability Battle; #32 Solving Your Problems! Snack Mao [Night 7 / Night 8 / Night 9]
Hinano Kamimura	"A Curveball Anytime, Anywhere" Edition (『いつでもどこでも変化球編』)	#42 Let's Get to Know Hinano Kamimura, The Only Third Generation Member!; #47 Hinatazaka46 Debut Single Hit Prayer Announcement!; #48–50 Hinatazaka46 Debut Single Hit Prayer, 120 km Ekiden!
