= Hinatazaka de Aimashō =

Japanese variety show

- Title card

Japanese name
- Kanji: 日向坂で会いましょう
- Literal meaning: Let's meet at Hinatazaka
- Genre: Variety show
- Created by: Yasushi Akimoto
- Presented by: Audrey (Toshiaki Kasuga, Masayasu Wakabayashi)
- Starring: Hinatazaka46
- Narrated by: Yōhei Azakami
- Opening theme: "Tokimeki Sō"
- Country of origin: Japan
- Original language: Japanese
- No. of episodes: 314

Production
- Running time: 30 min.
- Production companies: Kmax Co., Ltd.

Original release
- Network: TV Tokyo
- Release: April 8, 2019 – present

Related
- Hiragana Oshi; Nogizakatte, Doko?; Nogizaka Kōjichū; Keyakitte, Kakenai?; Soko Magattara, Sakurazaka?

Hinatazaka de Aimashō (Japanese: 日向坂で会いましょう; lit. 'Let's Meet at Hinatazaka') is a Japanese late night variety show starring idol group Hinatazaka46. It is the successor to Hiragana Oshi and also hosted by the comedy duo Audrey. The show airs every Monday at 1:05 AM JST on TV Tokyo.

== History ==
On April 8, 2019, Hiragana Oshi was rebranded as Hinatazaka de Aimashō, following the rebranding of Hiragana Keyakizaka46 to Hinatazaka46 in March 2019. Hinatazaka de Aimashō also airs in a larger area than the previous show. The title is a reference to the real Hyūgazaka street in Minato, Tokyo, which can be alternately read as Hinatazaka, after which the group was named.

A baseball-style uniform worn during location shooting in Miyazaki Prefecture in 2019 (episodes 28−30).

The show is mostly recorded in the studio, but several location shootings have been carried out as well, mostly for the "hit prayer" challenges traditionally taken on by Sakamichi Series groups for each music release. These include Lake Biwa in Shiga Prefecture for the second single's dragon boat rowing challenge, Miura Peninsula in Kanagawa Prefecture for the first album's tilefish catching challenge, and various locations in Miyazaki Prefecture to commemorate the show's syndication in the prefecture.

Due to the COVID-19 pandemic, starting from the episode aired on May 17, 2020, the program transitioned from recording in a studio to recording remotely via Zoom. The remote episodes consisted of discussions of notable scenes from previous episodes and a three-part Academic Ability Test, the group's first one since their rebranding and second one overall. It returned to studio recording, with various health precautions, since the episode aired on July 18, 2020.

== Reception ==
Gendai Business commented that Hinatazaka de Aimashō is "funnier" than the usual idol variety shows, while idol journalist Yutaka Sato commented in Entame Next that the show "deviated" at times from the idol show formula to that of comedy shows, particularly noting the late 2020 episodes featuring comedian Takushi Tanaka. Sato attributed this to the Hinatazaka46 members' "greed" for laughter, a trait normally possessed by comedians; Wakabayashi and Kasuga have commented that some segments would be challenging even for experienced comedians. The interaction between the members and Audrey is also positively received, as well as the quality of post-production work.

In addition to the members' growth, pop culture writer Hiko commented that the show also documents the growth of the Audrey duo. Both of them had the reputation of being "shy" around women, and their connection with the members through the years had allowed them to "redo their youth", as they went from being bachelors when Hiragana Oshi started in 2018 to having daughters of their own as of 2022.

The September 2020 issue of B.L.T. magazine has the show as its feature story and named Shiho Katō, Kumi Sasaki, Suzuka Tomita, and Konoka Matsuda as Hinatazaka46's "comedy elites".

In August 2025, Eikichi Okada, deputy director of TV Tokyo's production department, named Hinatazaka de Aimashō as the station's "most entertaining program" at the time.

== Notable guests ==
- Kenji Hamatani, comedian (Hamaka-n), episodes 11–13, 33–34, 147–149
- Mitsuharu Sato, comedian (Dokidoki Camp), episodes 14–15, 25, 30, 44, 74, etc.
- Shunji Kōno, Governor of Miyazaki Prefecture, episode 30
- Takushi Tanaka, comedian (Ungirls), episodes 87–89, 97–98
- Takashi Yoshimura, comedian (Heisei Nobushi Kobushi), episode 124
- Michio, comedian (Tom Brown), episodes 230–231
- Nao Tōyama, voice actress, guest narrator, episode 383
- Kento Miyahara, pro wrestler, episode 388

== Home media ==
=== Volume 1 (2023) ===
The first set of home media was released on January 1, 2023. As with Hiragana Oshi, the episodes were released with a certain theme on each edition instead of in chronological order.

Featured member	Title	Episodes
Shiho Katō	Shiho Katō's Let's Meet at the Barbecue (加藤史帆のバーベキューで会いましょう)	#6–7 Get Rid of the Stingy Character! Let's Have Kasuga the Man Treat Everyone for Real!; #11–13 Kasuga the Man's Complete Treat! Hinatazaka46's Reward BBQ Bus Tour!; Audio commentary: Shiho Katō, Mana Takase, Mei Higashimura, Hiyori Hamagishi
Kumi Sasaki	Kumi Sasaki's Let's Meet for Baseball (佐々木久美の野球で会いましょう)	#19–20 Go for the Ceremonial First Pitch! The Miracle of Hinatazaka Baseball Club!; #28–30 Go Harder for the Ceremonial First Pitch! The Miracle of Hinatazaka Baseball Club in Miyazaki Camp; Audio commentary: Kumi Sasaki, Ayaka Takamoto, Hinano Kamimura, Haruyo Yamaguchi
Miku Kanemura	Miku Kanemura's Let's Meet with Audrey (金村美玖のオードリーに合いましょう)	#23 Let's Celebrate the Lonely Waka-chan's Birthday Together!; #33 It's Time to Repick Waka-sama's Favorite Member (double-length episode); #34 It's Time to Repick Waka-sama's Favorite Member (Unreleased Scenes); #43 Cheer Up Kasuga on His Birthday! A Whole 30 Minutes of Nibu Festival; Audio commentary: Miku Kanemura, Kyōko Saitō, Suzuka Tomita, Konoka Matsuda
Nao Kosaka	Nao Kosaka's Let's Meet at the Hit Campaigns (小坂菜緒のヒットキャンペーンで会いましょう)	#14–15 Let's Watch the 2nd Single Hit Prayer Recording Together!; #24–25 3rd Single Hit Prayer! Let's Record the Show's Original Music Video in One Cut!; #131 6th Single Hit Campaign "Tteka", Let's Paint a Giant Illustration Together!; Audio commentary: Nao Kosaka, Sarina Ushio, Hina Kawata, Mikuni Takahashi
Akari Nibu	Akari Nibu's Let's Meet at the Team Competitions (丹生明里の団体戦で会いましょう)	#17–18 Chan-nibu Extreme Battle! The Nibumonea; #47–48 HinaAi vs HinaMashō: Let's Decide Once and For All! Nickname Standardization Match; #105–106 First Debut Anniversary of the New Third-generation Members: Let's Leave Our Mark in the Battle to Surpass the Seniors; Audio commentary: Akari Nibu, Yūka Kageyama, Mirei Sasaki, Marie Morimoto

=== Volume 2 (2024) ===
The second set of home media was released on January 31, 2024.

Featured member	Title	Episodes
Kyōko Saitō	Kyōko Saitō's Let's Come to Love Baseball (齊藤京子の野球を好きになりましょう)	#26–27 Aiming for More Ceremonial First Pitches! The Miracle of the Hinatazaka Baseball Club!; #116 I'm No. 1 in This! Kyōko's Anything Ranking!!; #133–134 Revival! The Prestigious Hinatazaka Baseball Club!!; Audio commentary: Kyōko Saitō, Kumi Sasaki, and Mana Takase
Mirei Sasaki	Mirei Sasaki's Let's Reel In The Ohisamas' (Note: Hinatazaka46 fandom name) Hearts (佐々木美玲のおひさまたちを釣りましょう)	#40 Let's Look Back on the 20-year History of the First Members to Become Adults in the Reiwa Era; #72–73 What's Wrong With Being Cunningly Cute? The 2nd Burikko Championship; #74–75 I Want to Catch One! I Want to Show It Off! I Want to Let Them Hear It! Reel In Lucky Fish From the Sea; Audio commentary: Mirei Sasaki, Miku Kanemura, Hiyori Hamagishi
Hina Kawata	Hina Kawata's Let's Meet Around Autumn (河田陽菜の秋頃に会いましょう) (Note: Kawata's botched ghost storytelling in episode 70 begins with "Was it around autumn?")	#8 Imaginary Future History, Episode 2; #70 Junji Hinagawa's Ghost Story Night; #71 Let's Warmly Watch Over the Inexperienced Girls' 'First Times'!; #83–84 The Path to Becoming a Great Actress: Now is the Time to Hone Your Acting Skills!; #165 Let's Belatedly Look Back on Kageyama and Kawata's 20-year History!; Audio commentary: Shiho Katō, Hina Kawata, Haruyo Yamaguchi
Konoka Matsuda	Konoka Matsuda's Let's Be Little Tooses (Note: Audrey fandom name) (松田好花のリトルトゥースになりましょう)	#144–146 Hinatazaka46 No.1 Sportswoman Deciding Match!! KASUKE; #181 Quiz! We Surveyed Around 100 Ohisamas; #185–186 Whose Love for the Members is the Strongest? Autumn G1 Hinatazaka Derby 2022; Audio commentary: Ayaka Takamoto, Mei Higashimura, Suzuka Tomita, Konoka Matsuda
Hinano Kamimura	Hinano Kamimura's Let's Meet the Third-generation Members (上村ひなのの三期生に出会いましょう)	#51 Dear Waka-san, Hinano Has Made Some Friends, So Let's Introduce the New Third-generation Members to Everyone; #81–82 Are the Seniors Getting in the Way? Let's Bring Out the True Faces of the Third-generation members!; #193–194 When the Lucky Girl of the Zodiac Year is Decided at Midnight! The 1st Lucky Girl Championship! (Note: The group's eighth single is titled "Tsuki to Hoshi ga Odoru Midnight"); Audio commentary: Nao Kosaka, Hinano Kamimura, Mikuni Takahashi, Marie Morimoto

=== 2025 ===
Released on April 9, 2025.

Title	Episodes
Let's Have a Battle Right at the Start of the New Year (新年早々バトりましょう)	#90–91 New Year's Special Project! Battle for High-Grade Wagyu Beef! Cow Girl Battle!!; #141–142 Who's the Luckiest in the Year of the Tiger! Hinatazaka46 Lucky Girl Deciding Match!!; #243–244 Let's Grab It!! Dragon Girl Faction Battle!!; Audio commentary: Hina Kawata, Konoka Matsuda, Mikuni Takahashi
Let's Expose the OBKs (Note: From obaka (おバカ; lit. 'fool')) (OBKを炙り出しましょう)	#127 Show Off Your Imagination! Queen of No Riddle-solving Spark Contest!; #174–175 Defeat the Quiz Queen!! Hinatazaka46 Quiz Battle!; #203–205 New Students Have Joined, So Let's Have an Academic Ability Test!!; Audio commentary: Miku Kanemura, Hinano Kamimura, Haruyo Yamaguchi
Let's Gather The Klutzes (ポンコツたちを集めましょう)	#172–173 Summer Vacation Special Project! Midnight Confession Gathering! (Note: A song on the group's seventh single is titled "Mayonaka no Zange Taikai" (真夜中の懺悔大会; lit. 'Midnight Confession Gathering')); #207–208 Gather 'Round, Klutz Forest! Welcome, Airheads!; #219 Let's Draw Up Marie's Genius Relationship Chart!!; #242 Wrap Up 2023! Midnight Confession Gathering!; Audio commentary: Suzuka Tomita, Marie Morimoto, Haruka Yamashita
Let's Get to Know the Fourth-generation Members (四期生を知ってもらいましょう)	#183–184 Audrey-san, We'd Really Like You to Meet Our New Juniors!; #188–189 Hinatazaka46 Fourth-generation Members' Athletic Ability Check Team!!; #201–202 Find the Second Nibu-chan!! Fourth-generation Members' Reaction Check Team; Audio commentary: Yōko Shōgenji, Honoka Hirao, Kaho Fujishima
Let's Go to Miyazaki (宮崎に行きましょう)	#223–225 The Members' All-Out Great Project! The Great Summer Sports Day Team Competition!!; #240–241 Celebrating the Team Competition Victory! Higashimura Gentlemanly Army's Reward Location Shoot in Miyazaki; Audio commentary: Kumi Sasaki, Mirei Sasaki, Nao Kosaka

=== 2026 ===
Released on April 29, 2026.

Title	Episodes
Let's Fall in Love with Delusional Pounding Hearts (妄キュンで恋しちゃいましょう)	#150–151 A Late Valentine's Day: Heart-Pounding Fantasy Reading Sessions!!; #190–191 Christmas Special! Heart-Pounding Fantasy Confession Situations; #290–291 A Slightly Early Christmas! Heart-Pounding Fantasy Confession Situations 2024; Audio commentary: Rio Shimizu, Kaho Fujishima, Rina Watanabe
Let's Decide Who's Mightier (どっちが強いか決めましょう)	#212–213 To Be a 'Hama Girl: The 1st Yokohama-suitable Girl Championship!; #256–257 The Duels Return; #270–271 Marine Day Commemorative "Ah, Summer Vacation" Battle!!; Audio commentary: Haruyo Yamaguchi, Tamaki Ishizuka, Kirari Takeuchi, Sumire Miyachi
Let's Go on Reward Location Shootings (ご褒美でロケしましょう)	#167–169 Hit Campaign Victory Celebration! Reward Tour; #323–324 Gather 'Round, Lone Wolves! Reward Tour!!; Audio commentary: Mikuni Takahashi, Nanami Konishi, Yōko Shōgenji
Let's Become Friendly (フレンドリーになりましょう)	#196–197 Celebrating Toshiaki Kasuga's 44th Birthday! Let's have a blast with Kasu-chan!!; #267–268 Let's Become Friendly with Waka-sama and Get Him to Call Us by Our Desired Nicknames!!; #282–283 Let's Become Friendly with Waka-sama — Senior Edition; Audio commentary: Marie Morimoto, Honoka Hirao, Haruka Yamashita
Let's Celebrate Graduations with a Smile (笑って卒業を祝いましょう)	#222 Yūka Kageyama Graduation Commemoration: Kasuga's Having a Hard Time, Goodbye Kage-san; #239 Sarina Ushio Graduation Commemoration: Terima Kasih! Sarimakasih! Sampai Jumpa Lagi! (Note: Indonesian for "Thank You! Sarimakasih! See You Again!"); #255 Kyōko Saitō Graduation Commemoration: Kyōko's Anything Ranking Special; #269 Ayaka Takamoto Graduation Commemoration: The 2nd Yokohama-suitable Girl Championship!; #293 Shiho Katō, Mei Higashimura, Akari Nibu, Hiyori Hamagishi Graduation Commemoration: Let's Send Them Off with Kasukasu Radio!!; #306 Kumi Sasaki, Mirei Sasaki, Mana Takase Graduation Commemoration: Let's Make Your Dreams Come True Special; #340 Hina Kawata Graduation Commemoration: Kawafes 2025 ~Autumn~; Audio commentary: Miku Kanemura, Nao Kosaka, Hinano Kamimura, Mitsuki Hiraoka
