= Samidare yo =

2022 single by Sakurazaka46

- Regular edition

Single by Sakurazaka46

from the album As You Know?
- B-side: "Boku no Dilemma" (all versions); "Koi ga zetsumetsu suru hi" (regular); "I'm in" (Type A); "Danzetsu" (Type B); "Seifuku no Ningyo" (Type C); "Shakankyori" (Type D)
- Released: April 6, 2022
- Genre: J-pop
- Length: 5:16
- Label: Sony Music Japan
- Composer: Atsushi
- Lyricist: Yasushi Akimoto

Sakurazaka46 singles chronology
"Nagaredama" (2021)	"Samidare yo" (2022)	"Sakurazuki" (2023)

Music video
- "Samidare yo" on YouTube

"Samidare yo" (五月雨よ) is the fourth single by Japanese idol group Sakurazaka46 after their 2020 renaming. It was released on April 6, 2022. The title track features Ten Yamasaki as center.

== Track listing ==
Regular edition
No.	Title	Length
1.	"Samidare yo" (五月雨よ)	5:16
2.	"Boku no Dilemma" (僕のジレンマ)	4:39
3.	"Koi ga zetsumetsu suru hi" (恋が絶滅する日)	3:57
4.	"Samidare yo" (五月雨よ; off vocal version)	5:16
5.	"Boku no Dilemma" (僕のジレンマ; off vocal version)	4:39
6.	"Koi ga zetsumetsu suru hi" (恋が絶滅する日; off vocal version)	3:56

Type A CD
No.	Title	Length
1.	"Samidare yo" (五月雨よ)	5:16
2.	"Boku no Dilemma" (僕のジレンマ)	4:39
3.	"I'm in"	5:01
4.	"Samidare yo" (五月雨よ; off vocal version)	5:16
5.	"Boku no Dilemma" (僕のジレンマ; off vocal version)	4:39
6.	"I'm in"	5:00

Type B CD
No.	Title	Length
1.	"Samidare yo" (五月雨よ)	5:16
2.	"Boku no Dilemma" (僕のジレンマ)	4:39
3.	"Danzetsu" (断絶)	4:13
4.	"Samidare yo" (五月雨よ; off vocal version)	5:16
5.	"Boku no Dilemma" (僕のジレンマ; off vocal version)	4:39
6.	"Danzetsu" (断絶; off vocal version)	4:11

Type C CD
No.	Title	Length
1.	"Samidare yo" (五月雨よ)	5:16
2.	"Boku no Dilemma" (僕のジレンマ)	4:39
3.	"Seifuku no Ningyo" (制服の人魚)	4:51
4.	"Samidare yo" (五月雨よ; off vocal version)	5:16
5.	"Boku no Dilemma" (僕のジレンマ; off vocal version)	4:39
6.	"Seifuku no Ningyo" (制服の人魚; off vocal version)	4:50

Type D CD
No.	Title	Length
1.	"Samidare yo" (五月雨よ)	5:16
2.	"Boku no Dilemma" (僕のジレンマ)	4:39
3.	"Shakankyori" (車間距離)	4:24
4.	"Samidare yo" (五月雨よ; off vocal version)	5:16
5.	"Boku no Dilemma" (僕のジレンマ; off vocal version)	4:39
6.	"Shakankyori" (車間距離; off vocal version)	4:23

== Participating members ==
=== Samidare yo ===
3rd Row: Yui Takemoto, Rina Matsuda, Rina Inoue, Mizuho Habu, Yumiko Seki, Rina Uemura, Rei Ozono

2nd Row: Rena Moriya, Minami Koike, Risa Watanabe, Yui Kobayashi, Karin Fujiyoshi

1st Row: Hikaru Morita, Ten Yamasaki (centre), Hono Tamura

== Charts ==
=== Weekly charts ===
Weekly chart performance for "Samidare yo"
Chart (2022)	Peak position
Japan (Japan Hot 100)	1
Japan (Oricon)	1

=== Year-end charts ===
Year-end chart performance for "Samidare yo"
Chart (2022)	Position
Japan (Oricon)	19
