= Sunshine Ikezaki =

Japanese comedian

- サンシャイン池崎
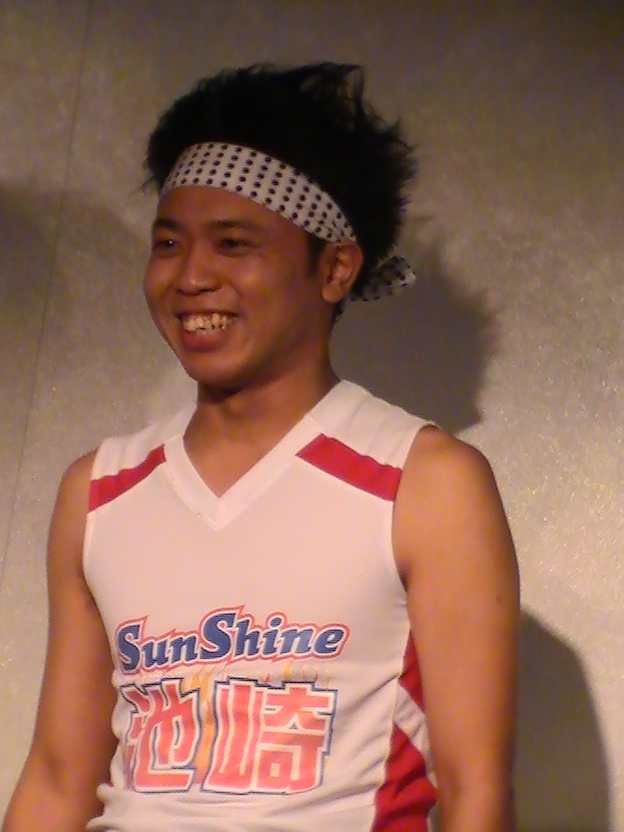
- Sunshine in 2016
- Born: Satoru Ikezaki; 9 October 1981 (age 44); Kanoya, Kagoshima, Japan
- Education: Oita Faculty of Engineering, Information Systems
- Employer: Watanabe Entertainment

Comedy career
- Years active: 2005–
- Medium: Television
- Genres: Owarai, gags

Notes
- Same year/generation as: Haraichi

Satoru Ikezaki (池崎 慧, Ikezaki Satoru; born October 9, 1981, in Kanoya, Kagoshima, Japan), better known for his stage name Sunshine Ikezaki (サンシャイン池崎, Sanshain Ikezaki), is a Japanese comedian. His talent agency is Watanabe Entertainment.

== Life and career ==
Ikezaki attended Kanoya High School and graduated with a Bachelor of Engineering, majoring in information systems at Oita University. In middle school, he was in the table tennis club for all three years and had inter-school competitive experience at the prefecture level. In high school, he was a part of the rowing team, and placed 2nd at the prefecture championships, and was a participant in the Kyushu championships.

After graduating university, Ikezaki did not pursue any jobs, but moved to Tokyo at the recommendation of his girlfriend at the time and joined Watanabe Entertainment in April 2005. He formed the comedy duo Sonic Brothers with a friend from university who also went to Tokyo, but were unsuccessful as the group dissolved in September 2007. Ikezaki continued activities as a solo comedian afterwards.

In 2008, he participated in the R-1 Grand Prix and made it to the 2nd round. In 2014, he made it to the semi-finals. In 2016, Ikezaki made it to the finals for the first time after finishing 3rd at the Resurrection Stage. The year after, Ikezaki once again made it to the finals from the Resurrection Stage and finished 2nd place overall as a finalist.

Ikezaki's performance in R-1 Grand Prix propelled him to popularity as he has been appearing frequently on television since 2016. He was already gaining traction before that, with a decent number of appearances on various comedy focus programs.
