= Teruyuki Tsuchida =

Japanese comedian and TV presenter

- 土田 晃之
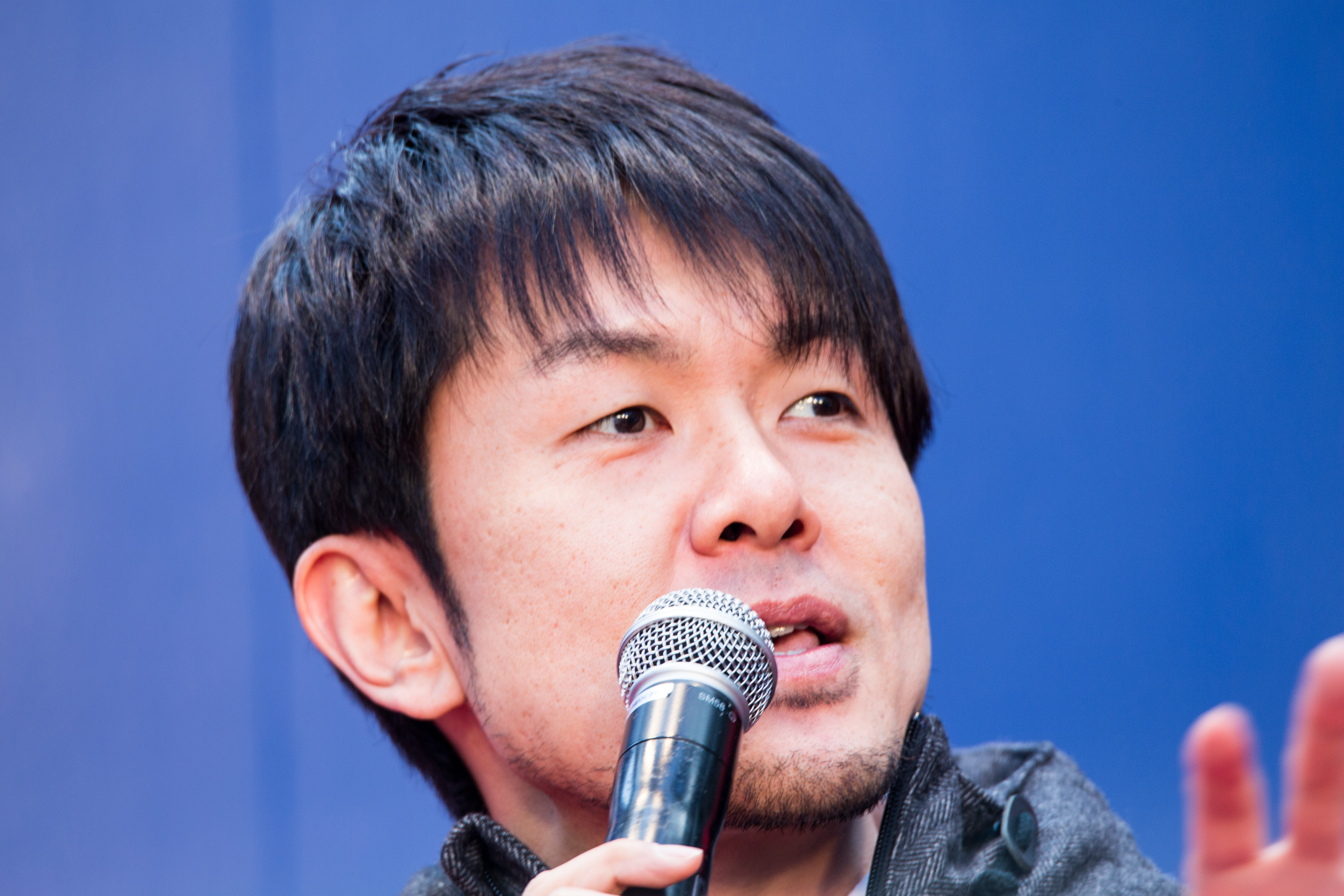
- Aeroflot Manchester United Trophy Tour in Tokyo
- Born: 1 September 1972 (age 54); Nerima, Tokyo, Japan raised in Omiya, Saitama
- Employer: Ohta Production
- Spouse: Married
- Children: 4

Comedy career
- Years active: 1991–present
- Medium: Television
- Genre: Owarai

Teruyuki Tsuchida (土田 晃之, Tsuchida Teruyuki; born September 1, 1972 in Nerima, Tokyo and grew up in Omiya, Saitama) is a Japanese comedian, tarento and TV presenter. His talent agency is Ohta Production.

He has been active as a solo comedian since 2001, but started in the entertainment industry in 1992 as a kombi called U-Turn with Morihiro Tsushima, which dissolved in 2001 when Tsushima retired from the industry.

== Life and career ==
Tsuchida lived in Tokyo until the first grade of elementary school when he moved to Omiya, Saitama prefecture. Throughout his school years, Tsuchida has experienced difficulty keeping up with his studies and had attitude problems, causing him to drop out and be suspended multiple times. He was a delinquent in those years, and only managed to stay in school at the behest of his father despite his poor grades and rebellious attitude.

After graduating high school, Tsuchida enrolled in the Tokyo Announcer Academy for the comedy talent course. His classmates noted that he was good at acting, but had troubles because he was unable to read some of the kanji on the scripts. During this period, he also worked part time as an extra at Fuji TV, appearing in several variety programs at the time.

At the Tokyo Announcer Academy, Tsuchida met Morihiro Tsushima, who was the president of the student council in high school. The combination of former delinquent and former student council president generated popularity for the duo as they decided to form a comedy unit together called U-Turn. The duo was well received immediately after formation with their conte skits. However, throughout the 10 years leading up to the unit's dissolve, their popularity did not rise and dwindled as by 1999, the group had almost zero regular programs and little income compared to earlier years.

In 2001, Tsushima retired from the industry and U-Turn was dissolved. Tsuchida continued activities as a solo comedian and thrived as a comedic reporter at first. He slowly gained popularity with his talk skills and persona with appearances on multiple talk shows and achieved success. Recently, he has also worked as a media commentator and expresses his views on various issues on TV.

== Character ==
- Played baseball in elementary school and soccer in middle school. Because he was not very athletic, he was forced to play in the position of defender.
- His biggest interests are soccer, idols, and anime (mainly Gundam) and was able to receive many bookings related to them in his career.
- Very knowledgeable in regards to home consumer electronics (such as vacuum cleaners), with the exception of computers.
