= Ten Yamasaki =

Japanese singer, model, and actress

- 山﨑 天
- Born: September 28, 2005 (age 21); Osaka Prefecture, Japan
- Occupations: Singer; model; actress
- Years active: 2018–present
- Musical career
- Genre: J-pop
- Instrument: Vocals
- Label: Sony Music
- Member of: Sakurazaka46
- Modeling information
- Height: 169 cm (5 ft 7 in)
- Hair color: Black
- Website: Official website

Ten Yamasaki (Japanese: 山﨑 天, Hepburn: Yamasaki Ten; born September 28, 2005) is a Japanese singer, model, and actress. She is the captain of the idol group Sakurazaka46 (formerly Keyakizaka46) and an exclusive model for the fashion magazine ViVi.

Yamasaki has been called the "ace" and "symbol" of Sakurazaka46, and has been the original lead performer for the most Sakurazaka46 songs. She coined the Sakurazaka46 fandom name, Buddies, after a song on Sakurazaka46's debut single.

Yamasaki has appeared in numerous fashion events and served as a model for fashion brands. As an actress, she played the lead role in the short film A Train of Memories and a supporting role in the television drama Kokoro no Fufufu. She has also starred in various commercials.

== Filmography ==
=== Film ===
Year	Title	Role	Notes	Ref.
2026	We Are Aliens	Konatsu (voice)		

=== Television ===
Year	Title	Role	Notes	Ref.
2026	The Game of Death or Youth	Akane Ochiai	Lead role	
