= Dare ga Sono Kane o Narasu no ka? =

2020 single by Keyakizaka46

Single by Keyakizaka46

from the album Eien Yori Nagai Isshun: Ano Koro, Tashika ni Sonzaishita Watashitachi
- Language: Japanese
- English title: Who will ring the bell?
- Released: August 21, 2020
- Genre: J-pop
- Length: 4:05
- Label: Sony Music Entertainment Japan
- Songwriter: Yasushi Akimoto

Keyakizaka46/Sakurazaka46 singles chronology
"Kuroi Hitsuji" (2019)	"Dare ga Sono Kane o Narasu no ka?" (2020)	"Nobody's Fault" (2020)

"Dare ga Sono Kane o Narasu no ka?" (Japanese: 誰がその鐘を鳴らすのか?; lit. "who will ring the bell?") is the ninth and final single from Japanese idol group Keyakizaka46. The single was released on August 21, 2020, the group's five-year anniversary, as a digital download only.

== Background and Release ==
Since the release of "Kuroi Hitsuji" in early 2019, Keyakizaka46 has gone through major changes to its roster. The group saw the arrival of fifteen new members (known as the "second generation") and the departure of Neru Nagahama, a prominent member of the group. Additionally, Hiragana Keyakizaka46, who performed B-sides to all of Keyakizaka46's singles so far, became an independent group known as Hinatazaka46.

On September 8, 2019, Keyakizaka46 held an senbatsu (member choosing) on Keyakitte, Kakenai?, a weekly television show featuring the group. The senbatsu featured Yurina Hirate at the center position. Originally set to be released at the end 2019, the release was first delayed due to production issues, and then further delayed with the sudden departure of Hirate from the group in January 2020.

In February 2020, a Japanese retail company AEON released a new advertising campaign for their credit card that featured Keyakizaka46 in the commercials. At the end of the commercials, a short excerpt of "Dare ga Sono Kane o Narasu no ka?" was played. On July 16, 2020, Keyakizaka46 live streamed a concert titled Keyakizaka46 Live Online, but with YOU!, where they performed the song for the first time. Instead of using the senbatsu results from earlier, all of the 28 members were featured in the song. The group confirmed that this would be the last single released under the Keyakizaka46 name, and the group would be renamed and reorganized in the future.

== Charts ==
Weekly chart performance for "Dare ga Sono Kane o Narasu no ka?"
Chart (2020)	Peak position
Japan (Japan Hot 100)	14
