= Hibiki: Shōsetsuka ni Naru Hōhō =

Japanese manga series

- First tankōbon volume cover, featuring Akui Hibiki

響 小説家になる方法
- Manga
- Written by: Mitsuharu Yanamoto
- Published by: Shogakukan
- Magazine: Big Comic Superior
- Original run: August 22, 2014 – October 11, 2019
- Volumes: 13
- Live-action film
- Directed by: Sho Tsukikawa
- Written by: Masafumi Nishida
- Studio: Toho
- Released: September 14, 2018
- Runtime: 106 minutes
- icon

Hibiki: Shōsetsuka ni Naru Hōhō (響 小説家になる方法; lit. 'Resonance: How to Become a Novelist') is a Japanese manga series written and illustrated by Mitsuharu Yanamoto. It was serialized in Shogakukan's seinen manga magazine Big Comic Superior from August 2014 to October 2019, with its chapters collected in 13 tankōbon volumes.

A live-action film adaptation, starring Keyakizaka46's Yurina Hirate as Hibiki, was released in September 2018.

By October 2019, Hibiki: Shōsetsuka ni Naru Hōhō had over 2.3 million copies in circulation. The manga won the 10th Manga Taishō award in 2017 and the 64th Shogakukan Manga Award for the general category in 2019.

== Plot ==
The staff of a literary magazine worries about the poor state of the book publishing industry. A handwritten manuscript is sent to their newcomer's contest. Since the contest only accepts web submissions, the manuscript is supposed to be thrown away, but it catches the eye of an editor called Hanai. The manuscript is under the name "Hibiki Akui", but has no contact address. Meanwhile, an eccentric girl called Hibiki is entering high school and decides to join the school's literature club.

== Media ==
=== Manga ===
Hibiki: Shōsetsuka ni Naru Hōhō, written and illustrated by Mitsuharu Yanamoto, was serialized in Shogakukan's seinen manga magazine Big Comic Superior from August 22, 2014, to October 11, 2019. Shogakukan collected its chapters in thirteen tankōbon volumes, released from February 27, 2015, to November 29, 2019.

==== Volumes ====
No.	Japanese release date	Japanese ISBN
1	February 27, 2015	978-4-09-186769-8
2	July 30, 2015	978-4-09-187148-0
3	December 28, 2015	978-4-09-187368-2
4	June 30, 2016	978-4-09-187646-1
5	November 30, 2016	978-4-09-189244-7
6	April 12, 2017	978-4-09-189490-8
7	August 10, 2017	978-4-09-189620-9
8	December 27, 2017	978-4-09-189707-7
9	April 27, 2018	978-4-09-189864-7
10	August 30, 2018	978-4-09-860067-0
11	January 30, 2019	978-4-09-860209-4
12	June 28, 2019	978-4-09-860323-7
13	November 29, 2019	978-4-09-860448-7

=== Live-action film ===
A live-action film adaptation, starring Yurina Hirate as Hibiki, was released on September 14, 2018.

== Reception ==
By October 2019, the manga had over 2.3 million copies in circulation.

The manga ranked 12th in the 2016 edition of Takarajimasha's Kono Manga ga Sugoi! guidebook for male readers. The manga was nominated for the 10th Manga Taishō awards in 2017; and respectively won the award. In 2019, the manga, along with Kenkō de Bunkateki na Saitei Gendo no Seikatsu, won the 64th Shogakukan Manga Award for the general category.

== See also ==
- Ryū to Ichigo, another manga series by the same author
