= Karin Fujiyoshi =

Japanese singer and actress (born 2001)

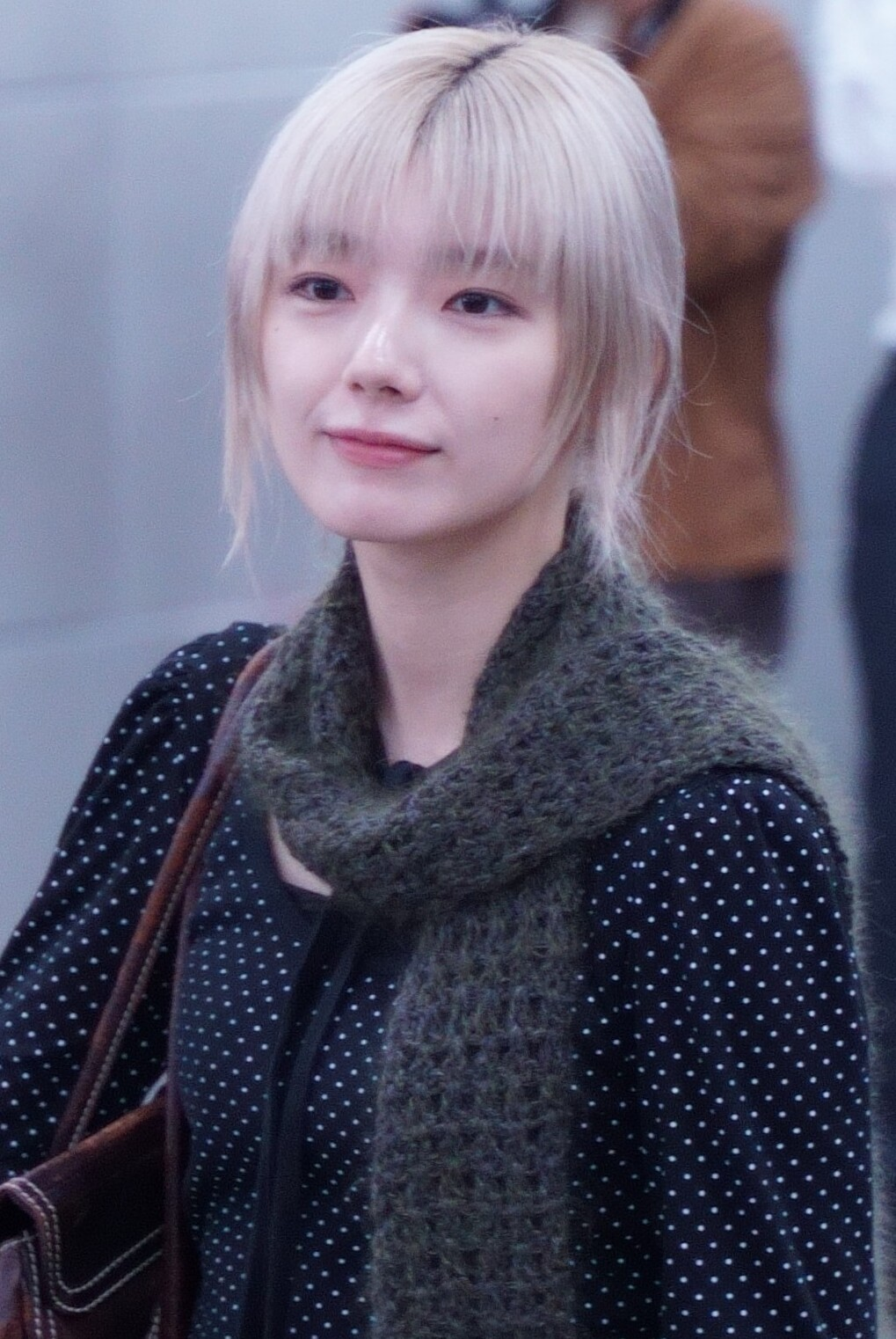
- Fujiyoshi in Taiwan in 2025
- Born: August 29, 2001 (age 24); Osaka Prefecture, Japan
- Occupations: Singer; actress
- Musical career
- Genres: J-pop
- Instrument: Vocals
- Years active: 2018–present
- Labels: Seed & Flower LLC
- Member of: Sakurazaka46; Keyakizaka46; (Note: Keyakizaka46 went on hiatus after their live performance THE LAST LIVE, held on October 12 and 13, 2020, and Sakurazaka46 began their activities on October 14 of the same year.)

Japanese name
- Kanji: 藤吉 夏鈴
- Hiragana: ふじよし かりん
Transcriptions
- Romanization: Fujiyōshi Karin

Karin Fujiyoshi (Japanese: 藤吉 夏鈴, romanized: Fujiyoshi Karin; born August 29, 2001) is a Japanese singer and actress. She is a second generation member of the idol girl group Sakurazaka46.

== Early life and career ==
Karin Fujiyoshi was born on August 29, 2001 in Osaka Prefecture, Japan.

On August 19, 2018, she passed the Sakamichi Joint New Member Recruitment Audition and joined Keyakizaka46 on November 10. On December 10 of the same year, she made her stage debut at the "Keyakizaka46 2nd Generation and 3rd Generation Meet and Greet," performing three songs with fellow members, at the event, she was chosen to be the center for the song "Silent Majority".

On February 29, 2020, Fujiyoshi made her runway debut at the "30th Mynavi Tokyo Girls Collection 2020 Spring/Summer". She was selected to be the center of the choreography for the first time in the song "Naze Koi o Shite Konakattan darō?" from Sakurazaka46's first single, "Nobody's Fault," released on December 9. That same year, on October 14, the girl group changed its name from Keyakizaka46 to Sakurazaka46.

Fujiyoshi was selected as the center of the choreography for Sakurazaka46's sixth single, "Start over!", which was released on June 28, 2023.

She made her first television appearance in the teen romance drama, Blue Spring Ride's Season 2, which began broadcasting and streaming on January 19, 2024. She also starred in her first film appearance in the movie The Scoop, released on August 9 of the same year.

== Filmography ==
=== Film ===
Year	Title	Role	Notes	Ref.
2024	The Scoop	Yui Tokoro	Lead role	
2026	Bayside Shakedown: N.E.W	Kiiko Murashita		

=== Television ===
Year	Title	Role	Notes	Ref.
2023–24	Blue Spring Ride	Yui Narumi	2 Seasons	
2024	She Loves to Cook, and She Loves to Eat	Sena Nagumo	Season 2	
2024	Monster	Sae Kawano	Episode 1	
