= Dining Bar Akira =

Japanese manga

- Japanese cover

くいもの処 明楽 (Kuimonodokoro Akira)
- Genre: Yaoi
- Manga
- Written by: Tomoko Yamashita
- Published by: Tokyomangasha
- English publisher: NA: Netcomics
- Published: March 15, 2007
- Volumes: 1

Dining Bar Akira (Japanese: くいもの処明楽, Hepburn: Kuimonodokoro Akira) is a Japanese manga written and illustrated by Tomoko Yamashita. It was published in Japan by Tokyomangasha and in North America by Netcomics. A drama CD was released in Japan by Momogre on September 26, 2007.

== Reception ==
Michelle Smith of Pop Culture Shock appreciates the need to earn trust in the relationship and the depiction of the men as being mature but hurt in the past, and felt vaguely dissatisfied by the open ending. Smith compares Yamashita's art to est em's. Kinukitty, writing for The Comics Journal-hosted blog Hooded Utilitarian, praised the artwork, and said of the story that "if you like your yaoi touchy, ill-tempered, and cross, with a twist of twisty, I think you'll be into it." Dining Bar Akira made About.com writer Deb Aoki's reader's choice of yaoi manga list. Johanna Draper Carlson from Manga Worth Reading liked that it was about "a guy coming to terms with his feelings" and the acknowledgement that "relationships don't exist in a vacuum."
