= Kenkō de Bunkateki na Saitei Gendo no Seikatsu =

Japanese manga series

- First tankōbon volume cover, featuring Emiru Yoshitsune

健康で文化的な最低限度の生活
- Manga
- Written by: Haruko Kashiwagi
- Published by: Shogakukan
- Magazine: Weekly Big Comic Spirits
- Original run: March 31, 2014 – present
- Volumes: 14
- Television drama

Caseworker's Diary – Constitutional Rights
- Directed by: Keita Motohashi
- Written by: Kōichi Yajima
- Original network: Fuji TV
- Original run: July 17, 2018 – September 18, 2018
- Episodes: 10
- icon

Kenkō de Bunkateki na Saitei Gendo no Seikatsu (Japanese: 健康で文化的な最低限度の生活; 'A Minimum Healthy and Cultural Life' (Note: The series title comes from Article 25 of the Constitution of Japan: "All people shall have the right to maintain the minimum standards of wholesome and cultured living.")) is a Japanese manga series written and illustrated by Haruko Kashiwagi. It has been serialized in Shogakukan's seinen manga magazine Weekly Big Comic Spirits since March 2014. A ten-episode television drama adaptation, known as Caseworker's Diary – Constitutional Rights, was broadcast on Fuji TV from July to September 2018.

In 2019, the manga won the 64th Shogakukan Manga Award in the general category.

== Characters ==
Emiru Yoshitsune (義経 えみる, Yoshitsune Emiru)
Portrayed by: Riho Yoshioka
China Kurihashi (栗橋 千奈, Kurihashi China)
Portrayed by: Rina Kawaei
Ryuichi Shichijo (七条 竜一, Shichijō Ryūichi)
Portrayed by: Yūki Yamada
Masao Akuzawa (阿久沢 正男, Akuzawa Masao)
Portrayed by: Kenichi Endō

== Media ==
=== Manga ===
Written and illustrated by Haruko Kashiwagi, Kenkō de Bunkateki na Saitei Gendo no Seikatsu started in Shogakukan's seinen manga magazine Weekly Big Comic Spirits on March 31, 2014. Shogakukan has collected its chapters into individual tankōbon volumes. The first volume was released on August 29, 2014. As of October 30, 2026, 14 volumes have been released.

==== Volumes ====
No.	Japanese release date	Japanese ISBN
1	August 29, 2014	978-4-09-186357-7
2	January 30, 2015	978-4-09-186746-9
3	January 29, 2016	978-4-09-187435-1
4	August 30, 2016	978-4-09-187810-6
5	May 30, 2017	978-4-09-189513-4
6	January 30, 2018	978-4-09-189786-2
7	August 30, 2018	978-4-09-860064-9
8	June 28, 2019	978-4-09-860320-6
9	June 30, 2020	978-4-09-860643-6
10	March 30, 2021	978-4-09-860871-3
11	February 28, 2022	978-4-09-861209-3
12	August 30, 2023	978-4-09-862548-2
13	November 12, 2024	978-4-09-863096-7
14	October 30, 2026	978-4-09-864145-1

=== Drama ===
A ten-episode television drama adaptation, known in English as Caseworker's Diary – Constitutional Rights, was broadcast on Fuji TV from July 17 to September 18, 2018. The series' opening theme is "Tomorrow", performed by AAA.

== Reception ==
By May 2018, the manga had 500,000 copies in circulation. By November 2024, it had over 1.25 million copies in circulation (print and digital versions).

The manga was one of the Jury Recommended Works at the 19th and 23rd Japan Media Arts Festival in 2015 and 2020, respectively. In 2019, the manga, along with Hibiki: Shōsetsuka ni Naru Hōhō, won the 64th Shogakukan Manga Award in the general category. It was also nominated for the 23rd Tezuka Osamu Cultural Prize in 2019.
