= Ryū to Ichigo =

Japanese manga series

- First tankōbon volume cover, featuring Ichigo Aida

龍と苺
- Manga
- Written by: Mitsuharu Yanamoto
- Published by: Shogakukan
- Imprint: Shōnen Sunday Comics
- Magazine: Weekly Shōnen Sunday
- Original run: May 20, 2020 – June 3, 2026
- Volumes: 29
- icon

Ryū to Ichigo (龍と苺) is a Japanese shogi-themed manga series written and illustrated by Mitsuharu Yanamoto. It was serialized in Shogakukan's shōnen manga magazine Weekly Shōnen Sunday from May 2020 to June 2026, with its chapters collected in 29 tankōbon volumes.

== Plot ==
At Fujigasaki Junior High School in Kitaese City, second-year student Ichigo Aida (藍田 苺, Aida Ichigo) attacks a bullying classmate with a chair. School counselor Tatsuo Miyamura (宮村 辰夫, Miyamura Tatsuo), a former principal, engages her in conversation while teaching her shogi, believing the activity will help her open up. Ichigo reveals she had no personal connection to the bullied student—she simply wanted a genuine fight, disgusted by what she sees as the artificial friendships and shallow emotions around her. During their game, Ichigo wagers her life on the outcome. Though initially humoring the novice player, Miyamura becomes alarmed as Ichigo demonstrates remarkable talent, nearly defeating him before losing to an illegal move. When Ichigo attempts suicide, Miyamura intervenes and later enters her in a local shogi tournament.

Despite only two days of experience, Ichigo defeats seasoned players through raw talent alone. Her winning streak ends when professional player Izuru Kōdai (伊鶴 航大, Izuru Kōdai), observing her matches, challenges her to continue from her final game's position and soundly defeats her. This first true loss ignites Ichigo's competitive spirit, and she resolves to pursue shogi professionally for a rematch with Izuru.

== Publication ==
Written and illustrated by Mitsuharu Yanamoto, Ryū to Ichigo was serialized in Shogakukan's shōnen manga magazine Weekly Shōnen Sunday from May 20, 2020, to June 3, 2026. Shogakukan has collected its chapters into 29 tankōbon volumes, released from August 18, 2020, to August 18, 2026.

=== Volumes ===
No.	Japanese release date	Japanese ISBN
1	August 18, 2020	978-4-09-850169-4
2	November 18, 2020	978-4-09-850280-6
3	March 17, 2021	978-4-09-850391-9
4	June 17, 2021	978-4-09-850536-4
5	September 17, 2021	978-4-09-850651-4
6	December 17, 2021	978-4-09-850739-9
7	March 17, 2022	978-4-09-850877-8
8	June 17, 2022	978-4-09-851149-5
9	September 15, 2022	978-4-09-851261-4
10	December 16, 2022	978-4-09-851477-9
11	March 16, 2023	978-4-09-851769-5
12	June 16, 2023	978-4-09-852124-1
13	September 15, 2023	978-4-09-852842-4
14	December 18, 2023	978-4-09-853049-6
15	March 18, 2024	978-4-09-853178-3
16	June 18, 2024	978-4-09-853377-0
17	August 17, 2024	978-4-09-853546-0
18	November 18, 2024	978-4-09-853680-1
19	February 18, 2025	978-4-09-854010-5
20	March 18, 2025	978-4-09-854019-8
21	June 18, 2025	978-4-09-854150-8
22	September 18, 2025	978-4-09-854238-3
23	December 18, 2025	978-4-09-854377-9
24	January 16, 2026	978-4-09-854412-7
25	March 18, 2026	978-4-09-854486-8
26	May 18, 2026	978-4-09-854535-3
27	June 18, 2026	978-4-09-854649-7
28	July 16, 2026	978-4-09-854706-7
29	August 18, 2026	978-4-09-854740-1

== Reception ==
The series ranked 37th on the 2022 "Book of the Year" list by Da Vinci magazine.

== See also ==
- Hibiki: Shōsetsuka ni Naru Hōhō, another manga series by the same author
