= She Loves to Cook, and She Loves to Eat =

Japanese manga series

- First tankōbon volume cover

作りたい女と食べたい女 (Tsukuritai Onna to Tabetai Onna)
- Genre: Cooking; Romance; Yuri
- Manga
- Written by: Sakaomi Yuzaki
- Published by: Kadokawa Shoten
- English publisher: NA: Yen Press
- Magazine: Comic It
- Original run: January 8, 2021 – present
- Volumes: 6
- Television drama
- Directed by: Yui Matsusaki; Hiroyuki Nakata
- Written by: Yuri Yamada
- Music by: Gorō Itō
- Original network: NHK General TV
- Original run: November 29, 2022 – February 29, 2024
- Episodes: 30
- icon

She Loves to Cook, and She Loves to Eat (Japanese: 作りたい女と食べたい女, Hepburn: Tsukuritai Onna to Tabetai Onna) is a Japanese web manga series written and illustrated by Sakaomi Yuzaki. It has been serialized on Kadokawa Shoten's digital manga manga magazine Comic It since January 2021. A 10-episode television drama adaptation was broadcast on NHK General TV from November to December 2022. A 20-episode second season aired from January to February 2024.

== Synopsis ==
Yuki Nomoto, a woman living alone in Tokyo, enjoys cooking, and while she posts her homemade dishes on social media, she regrets that she cannot make the large servings she longs for because she has a small appetite. After being frustrated at work, Nomoto accidentally cooks a large amount of food and is at a loss on how to eat it all. She then remembers her neighbor two houses down, Totoko Kasuga, who eats large amounts of fast food by herself. Nomoto decides to invite Kasuga to eat with her, soon forming a friendship around their love of cooking and eating. As they become closer overtime, visiting each other's houses and going on outings together, the pair begin to develop feelings for each other.

== Characters ==
Yuki Nomoto (野本 ユキ, Nomoto Yuki)
Portrayed by: Manami Higa
A woman who loves to cook, Yuki Nomoto is single woman living in Tokyo who enjoys sharing pictures online of her cooking. She has longed to cook big dishes like the ones she saw in picture books when she was a child, but she has never been able to do so because she lives alone and has a small appetite. However, after meeting Kasuga, she reaffirms the joy of cooking. Although her upbringing was fairly ordinary, since she was a child she has felt uncomfortable about her love life, her relationships with the men and what is considered "normal" by others. She is confused when she realizes her romantic feelings for Kasuga, but with the advice of her friend Yako, she embraces the realization that she is a lesbian.
Totoko Kasuga (春日 十々子, Kasuga Totoko)
Portrayed by: Emi Nishino
A woman who loves to eat, Kasuga lives in the apartment two doors down from Nomoto. She is usually very reserved, but gradually opens up as she and Nomoto share more meals together. She was raised in a conservative family where men were prioritized over women and was often served smaller meal portions compared to her father and brother. Her discomfort with her father's views on her place within the family caused her to eventually cut ties with them seek employment away from home.
Kaname Yako (矢子可菜芽, Yako Kaname)
Portrayed by: Rie Tomosaka
An online friend of Nomoto's, she loves to eat but has no interest in cooking, so she eats out or eats at convenience stores. She has followed Nomoto's social media for several years, enjoying her food posts, but only begins chatting more directly with her after Nomoto writes about her interest in a recently released lesbian film. As Nomoto comes to understand her own sexuality, Yako gives her advice from her perspective as an asexual lesbian.
Sena Nagumo (南雲瀬奈, Nagumo Sena)
Portrayed by: Karin Fujiyoshi
A young woman who moves into the apartment between Nomoto and Kasuga. She has had no interest in food since she was a child, and has been traumatized by her parents, who, although loving, were unsympathetic about it, and by a teacher who forced her to eat school lunches. As a result, she can only drink liquids in public and keeps her distance from her family. Through her interactions with Nomoto, Kasuga, and Yako, she learned that she has a phobia of eating in public, and began to work on cognitive therapy.

== Media ==
=== Manga ===
Written and illustrated by Sakaomi Yuzaki, She Loves to Cook, and She Loves to Eat originated on Yuzaki's Twitter and Pixiv accounts in March 2020. It then started on Kadokawa Shoten's digital manga magazine Comic It on January 8, 2021. The series went on hiatus in June 2024 and resumed in June 2026. Kadokawa Shoten has collected its chapters into individual tankōbon volumes. The first volume was released on June 15, 2021. As of June 15, 2026, six volumes have been released.

In March 2022, Yen Press announced that they licensed the series for English release in North America.

==== Volumes ====
No.	Original release date	Original ISBN	English release date	English ISBN
1	June 15, 2021	978-4-04-913651-7	October 18, 2022	978-1-9753-4882-3
2	December 15, 2021	978-4-04-914024-8	March 21, 2023	978-1-9753-6297-3
3	November 15, 2022	978-4-04-914424-6	October 17, 2023	978-1-9753-7233-0
4	June 15, 2023	978-4-04-914950-0	May 21, 2024	978-1-9753-8891-1
5	February 15, 2024	978-4-04-915337-8	January 21, 2025	979-8-8554-0781-5
6	June 15, 2026	978-4-04-915995-0	—	—

=== Drama ===
A television drama adaptation was announced in October 2022; it was written by Yuri Yamada, with Gorō Itō composing the music and Manami Higa and Emi Nishino performing the leads. It was broadcast for ten episodes on NHK General TV's Yorudora programming block from November 29 to December 14, 2022. A 20-episode second season was announced in June 2023, with the cast and staff reprising their roles from the first season. It aired from January 29 to February 29, 2024.

=== Other ===
In November 2022, a store selling merchandise from the series was opened. All the proceeds from the store will be donated to Marriage For All Japan, an organization advocating for same-sex marriage in Japan.

== Reception ==
=== Manga ===
On Takarajimasha's Kono Manga ga Sugoi! list of best manga of 2022 for women readers, the series ranked second. The series ranked 12th and 13th in the web category of the Next Manga Awards in the 2021 and 2022 editions respectively.

In Anime News Network's Fall 2022 Manga Guide, Rebecca Silverman gave volume 1 of She Loves to Cook, and She Loves to Eat 4.5 out 5, summarizing "this is yuri for the adult crowd, not because it's sexy or because it's more realistic ... but because it isn't about the short-term payoff – this is a story about two women who are just letting their relationship grow naturally." Similarly, Christopher Farris also gave the first volume 4.5 out 5, noting that the cooking and eating segments provide a strong framework for the narrative that allows it to explore other aspects of the characters lives, such as their everyday aggravations of sexism, though noting that "even with the societal stressors powering the background of it, She Loves to Cook, and She Loves to Eat still largely comes off as comfort food." MrAJCosplay gave the first volume 3 out of 5, praising Sakaomi's depiction of a variety of body types and feeling that "there isn't much in the way of recipes, but there's just something nice about watching other people enjoy something nice amongst good company."

=== Drama ===
Erica Friedman of Yuricon gave both seasons an overall 10 out of 10 rating. In her season 1 review Friedman praised the adaptation as being one of the "very best adaptation from a manga I have ever seen in any media." She further praised Manami Higa and Nishino Emi's performances, noting that Manami's portrayal of Nomoto "wears her every emotion openly, so we can burn with repressed rage, or tear up in amazed relief, or joy" while Nishino's portrayal "does a fantastic job of the sincere, eager, yet reserved, Kasuga." Friedman had similar praise in her season 2 review, summarizing that "as live-action adaptations of manga go, Tsukuritai Onna to Tabetai Onna is one of the best I've ever seen. It does not change or shy away from uncomfortable issues. When it takes a slightly reductive tack on things like systemic homophobia, or Nagumo's eating disorder, the series is not dismissive, it's focusing on the power of having allies, and support. After all, this is a feel-good evening drama, not an exposé.
