= Kuroi Hitsuji =

2019 single by Keyakizaka46

- Regular edition cover. Each version A, B, C, and D has separate cover artwork.

Single by Keyakizaka46

from the album Eien Yori Nagai Isshun: Ano Koro, Tashika ni Sonzaishita Watashitachi
- Released: February 27, 2019
- Genre: J-pop; Art pop
- Label: Sony Music Entertainment Japan
- Lyricist: Yasushi Akimoto

Keyakizaka46 singles chronology
"Ambivalent" (2018)	"Kuroi Hitsuji" (2019)	"Dare ga Sonokane o Narasunoka?" (2020)

Music video
- "Kuroi Hitsuji" (on the official website of Keyakizaka46) "Kuroi Hitsuji"(Vevo)

"Kuroi Hitsuji" (Japanese: 黒い羊, Hepburn: Kuroi Hitsuji; literally "Black sheep") is the 8th single from Japanese idol group Keyakizaka46. It was released on February 27, 2019, through Sony Music Entertainment Japan. The title track features Yurina Hirate as center.

The single was announced on January 14, 2019. The song was first broadcast on January 21 on Tokyo FM's program "SCHOOL OF LOCK!" and the music video was first released on Keyakizaka46's website on February 1, 2019.

== Track listing ==
=== Type A ===
All lyrics are written by Yasushi Akimoto.

CD
No.	Title	Length
1.	"Kuroi Hitsuji" (黒い羊)	5:07
2.	"Kimi ni Hanashite Okitai Koto" (君に話しておきたいこと)	4:57
3.	"Nobody"	3:48
4.	"Kuroi Hitsuji" (off-vocal)	5:08
5.	"Kimi ni Hanashite Okitai Koto" (off-vocal)	4:57
6.	"Nobody" (off-vocal)	3:47

Blu-ray
No.	Title	Length
1.	"Kuroi Hitsuji music video"	5:37
2.	"Nobody music video"	4:02
3.	"Keyakizaka46 Bonus Video ‘KEYAKI HOUSE’ ~Part.1~"

=== Type B ===
All lyrics are written by Yasushi Akimoto.

CD
No.	Title	Length
1.	"Kuroi Hitsuji" (黒い羊)	5:07
2.	"Kimi ni Hanashite Okitai Koto" (君に話しておきたいこと)	4:57
3.	"Dakishimete Yaru" (抱きしめてやる)	4:06
4.	"Kuroi Hitsuji" (off-vocal)	5:08
5.	"Kimi ni Hanashite Okitai Koto" (off-vocal)	4:57
6.	"Dakishimete Yaru" (off-vocal)	4:05

Blu-ray
No.	Title	Length
1.	"Kuroi Hitsuji music video"	5:37
2.	"Dakishimete Yaru music video"
3.	"Keyakizaka46 Bonus Video ‘KEYAKI HOUSE’ ~Part.2~"

=== Type C ===
All lyrics are written by Yasushi Akimoto.

CD
No.	Title	Length
1.	"Kuroi Hitsuji" (黒い羊)	5:07
2.	"Kimi ni Hanashite Okitai Koto" (君に話しておきたいこと)	4:57
3.	"Heel no Taka-sa" (ヒールの高さ)	3:50
4.	"Kuroi Hitsuji" (off-vocal)	5:08
5.	"Kimi ni Hanashite Okitai Koto" (off-vocal)	4:57
6.	"Heel no Taka-sa" (off-vocal)	3:49

Blu-ray
No.	Title	Length
1.	"Kuroi Hitsuji music video"	5:37
2.	"Heel no Taka-sa music video"	4:43
3.	"Keyakizaka46 Bonus Video ‘KEYAKI HOUSE’ ~Part.3~"

=== Type D ===
All lyrics are written by Yasushi Akimoto.

CD
No.	Title	Length
1.	"Kuroi Hitsuji" (黒い羊)	5:08
2.	"Kimi ni Hanashite Okitai Koto" (君に話しておきたいこと)	4:57
3.	"Gomen ne Christmas" (ごめんね クリスマス)	4:37
4.	"Kuroi Hitsuji" (off-vocal)	5:08
5.	"Kimi ni Hanashite Okitai Koto" (off-vocal)	4:57
6.	"Gomen ne Christmas" (off-vocal)	4:36

Blu-ray
No.	Title	Length
1.	"Kuroi Hitsuji music video"	5:37
2.	"Gomen ne Christmas music video"
3.	"Hiragana Keyakizaka46 Bonus Video “Hiragana Keyaki Chanto”"
4.	"Kanji Keyakizaka46 2nd Generation Bonus Video"
5.	"Hiragana Keyakizaka46 3rd Generation Bonus Video"

=== Regular edition ===
All lyrics are written by Yasushi Akimoto.

CD
No.	Title	Length
1.	"Kuroi Hitsuji" (黒い羊)	5:08
2.	"Kimi ni Hanashite Okitai Koto" (君に話しておきたいこと)	4:57
3.	"Hitei Shita Mirai" (否定した未来)	4:29
4.	"Kuroi Hitsuji" (off-vocal)	5:08
5.	"Kimi ni Hanashite Okitai Koto" (off-vocal)	4:57
6.	"Hitei Shita Mirai" (off-vocal)	4:28

== Participating members ==
=== "Kuroi Hitsuji" ===
Center: Yurina Hirate

- 1st row: Yui Kobayashi, Nijika Ishimori, Yurina Hirate, Minami Koike, Shiori Satō
- 2nd row: Nana Oda, Yūka Sugai, Risa Watanabe, Akane Moriya, Mizuho Habu
- 3rd row: Miyu Suzumoto, Nanako Nagasawa, Rika Ozeki, Neru Nagahama, Rika Watanabe, Rina Uemura, Fuyuka Saitō

=== “Kimi ni Hanashite Okitai Koto“ ===
- Hiragana Keyakizaka46 1st Generation: Mao Iguchi, Sarina Ushio, Memi Kakizaki, Shiho Katō, Kyōko Saitō, Kumi Sasaki, Mirei Sasaki, Mana Takase, Ayaka Takamoto, Mei Higashimura
- Hiragana Keyakizaka46 2nd Generation: Miku Kanemura, Hina Kawata, Nao Kosaka, Suzuka Tomita, Akari Nibu, Hiyori Hamagishi, Konoka Matsuda, Manamo Miyata, Miho Watanabe

=== "Nobody" ===
- Kanji Keyakizaka46: Nijika Ishimori, Rina Uemura, Rika Ozeka, Nana Oda, Minami Koike, Yui Kobayashi, Fuyuka Saitō, Shiori Satō, Yūka Sugai, Miyu Suzumoto, Nanako Nagasawa, Neru Nagahama, Mizuho Habu, Yurina Hirate, Akane Moriya, Rika Watanabe, Risa Watanabe

=== “Dakishimete Yaru“ ===
- Hiragana Keyakizaka46 1st Generation: Mao Iguchi, Sarina Ushio, Memi Kakizaki, Shiho Katō, Kyōko Saitō, Kumi Sasaki, Mirei Sasaki, Mana Takase, Ayaka Takamoto, Mei Higashimura
- Hiragana Keyakizaka46 2nd Generation: Miku Kanemura, Hina Kawata, Nao Kosaka, Suzuka Tomita, Akari Nibu, Hiyori Hamagishi, Konoka Matsuda, Manamo Miyata, Miho Watanabe

=== “Heel no Taka-sa” ===
- Kanji Keyakizaka46: Yūka Sugai, Akane Moriya

=== "Gomen ne Christmas" ===
- Kanji Keyakizaka46: Rina Uemura, Rika Ozeki, Nanako Nagasawa, Rika Watanabe

=== “Hitei Shita Mirai” ===
- Kanji Keyakizaka46: Neru Nagahama

== Charts ==
=== Weekly charts ===
Chart (2019)	Peak position
Japan (Japan Hot 100)	1
Japan (Oricon)	1

=== Year-end charts ===
Chart (2019)	Position
Japan (Japan Hot 100)	14
