= Journal with Witch =

Japanese manga series and its adaptations

- First tankōbon volume cover, featuring Makio (left) and Asa (right)

違国日記 (Ikoku Nikki)
- Genre: Drama
- Manga
- Written by: Tomoko Yamashita
- Published by: Shodensha
- English publisher: NA: Inklore
- Imprint: Feel Comics Swing
- Magazine: Feel Young
- Original run: June 8, 2017 – June 8, 2023
- Volumes: 11
- Live-action film
- Directed by: Natsuki Seta
- Written by: Natsuki Seta
- Music by: Masakatsu Takagi
- Released: June 7, 2024
- Runtime: 139 minutes
- Anime television series
- Directed by: Miyuki Oshiro
- Written by: Kōhei Kiyasu
- Music by: Kensuke Ushio
- Studio: Shuka
- Licensed by: Crunchyroll: SEA: Plus Media Networks Asia
- Original network: BS Asahi, Tokyo MX, ABC TV, AT-X
- Original run: January 4, 2026 – March 29, 2026
- Episodes: 13
- icon

Journal with Witch (Japanese: 違国日記, Hepburn: Ikoku Nikki; lit. 'Diary of a Strange Land') is a Japanese manga series written and illustrated by Tomoko Yamashita. It was serialized in Shodensha's josei manga magazine Feel Young from June 2017 to June 2023, with its chapters collected in 11 tankōbon volumes. The series follows Makio Kōdai, a reclusive novelist, and Asa Takumi, her orphaned niece who she takes in.

A live-action film adaptation was released in June 2024. A 13-episode anime television series adaptation produced by Shuka aired from January to March 2026.

The anime adaptation received overwhelmingly positive reviews, with praise for its writing, production value, and exploration of emotional themes; several critics named it as the best series of the season.

== Plot ==
Makio Kōdai is a 35-year-old novelist who dislikes social contact. Asa Takumi is Makio's 15-year-old niece left orphaned after her parents die in a car accident. While Makio had a strained relationship with Asa's mother, she takes Asa in after becoming frustrated with how the rest of their extended family treats her as a burden.

The two soon begin living together, and although Asa's friendly personality clashes with Makio's reserved nature, they adjust to their new life as Asa works through her grief and Makio tries socializing for the first time in years. At Makio's suggestion, Asa keeps a journal about her daily life and feelings.

== Characters ==
Makio Kōdai (高代 槙生, Kōdai Makio)
Voiced by: Miyuki Sawashiro
Portrayed by: Yui Aragaki
A 35-year-old writer who lives alone. She is deeply introverted, and has not communicated with her relatives for a long time due to arguments with her mother and sister.
Asa Takumi (田汲 朝, Takumi Asa)
Voiced by: Fuko Mori
Portrayed by: Ikoi Hayase
Makio's teenage niece. She is left without any immediate family to take care of her after the death of her parents.
Nana Daigo (醍醐 奈々, Daigo Nana)
Voiced by: Eriko Matsui
Portrayed by: Kaho
Makio's best friend. She has been friends with Makio since their teenage years.
Emiri Nara (楢 えみり, Nara Emiri)
Voiced by: Sumire Morohoshi
Portrayed by: Rina Komiyama
Asa's classmate and best friend. They have known each other since elementary school, but briefly lose touch due to Asa's family problems. Asa eventually learns that Emiri is a lesbian and that Emiri is dating a girl who attends the same preparatory classes.
Shingo Kasamachi (笠町 信吾, Kasamachi Shingo)
Voiced by: Junichi Suwabe
Portrayed by: Kōji Seto
Makio's former boyfriend. They encounter each other again after Asa moves in.
Kyōko Kōdai (高代 京子, Kōdai Kyōko)
Portrayed by: Guin-Poon-Chaw
Makio's mother and Asa's grandmother.
Minori Kōdai (高代 実里, Kōdai Minori)
Voiced by: Sayaka Ohara
Portrayed by: Yūko Nakamura
Asa's mother and Makio's older sister. She and her partner, who never legally married, died in a car crash, leaving Asa orphaned.
Kazunari Tōno (塔野 和成, Tōno Kazunari)
Voiced by: Takashi Kondō
Portrayed by: Shota Sometani
A legal representative who oversees Makio's guardianship duties. He appears clumsy and insensitive, but genuinely cares for others.
Mimori (三森)
Portrayed by: Erika Takizawa
A first-year student who attends the band club at Asa's high school. She was picked to perform with the band at a concert while Asa was absent.
Chise Morimoto (森本 千世, Morimoto Chise)
Portrayed by: Himena Irei
A first-year student acquainted with both Asa and Emiri, who aspires to be a doctor. She discovers a scandal involving the medical school she was applying to, and reacts angrily.

== Themes ==
=== Relationship dynamics ===
Makio's relationship with Asa was the subject of substantial commentary. Yamashita, the manga's author, stated that a theme of the story was how people can never truly understand each other. Yuko Hasada of Quick Japan Web argued that the story depicts Asa becoming more expressive with her feelings, even when they are not necessarily understood. Hasada referenced a scene where Makio affirms Asa's right to feel as she does despite her emotions conflicting with societal norms. Writing for Real Sound, Tomariko suggested that Makio and Asa are connected by their shared separation from society—Makio by choice and Asa by circumstance. Tomariko argued that Makio's role lies not in understanding Asa's feelings, but rather accepting them, and concluded that one of the series's central themes is acknowledging the independence of individuals.

Hidekazu Yuki of Nobody Magazine opined that the story differs from other stories regarding different personalities because it respects the characters' mutual differences, rather than depicting them easily getting along or adapting to each other. Similarly, author Hirano Yū felt that the series emphasizes the importance of respecting boundaries and not imposing values on others, as shown by interactions where Makio tries to make Asa understand that feelings are not meant to be judged. In regards to Makio and Asa's dynamic, Caitlin Moore of Anime News Network (ANN) regarded its portrayal as "intertwined, one informing the other, greater than they are individually". Sylvia Jones of the same site argued that the narrative's "big picture" was about the importance of emotional bonds between women in ordinary life.

=== Grief ===
The story's treatment of grief was widely discussed by critics. Tomariko observed that Asa's initial emotion following her parents' death is anger rather than sadness, attributing this to her complicated relationship with them and newfound need to find her own path in life. Similarly, Shosuke Tanihara of Book Asahi, from the Asahi Shimbun, noted that the narrative focuses on Asa's difficulty processing her emotions in the wake of loss, and argued that the series addresses the challenges of understanding contradictory or unfamiliar feelings.

Allyson Johnson of In Between Drafts opined that the anime adaptation's approach provides a deeply intimate depiction of grief, stating that it "capture[s] [the] sensation of murky, clumsy self-realization" that "there are no neat ends". She supported this through the analysis that the story deliberately avoids creating "breakdowns or breakthroughs" solely for "narrative convenience". James Beckett of ANN concurred, arguing that the story is realistically depicted and sidesteps "melodrama" or "showy displays".

== Media ==
=== Manga ===
Written and illustrated by Tomoko Yamashita, Journal with Witch was serialized in Shodensha's josei manga magazine Feel Young from June 8, 2017, to June 8, 2023. Shodensha collected its chapters in 11 tankōbon volumes, released from November 8, 2017, to August 8, 2023.

In July 2026, Penguin Random House's imprint, Inklore, announced during its panel at Anime Expo that it had licensed the manga for English release in North America, with the first volume set to release in Q3 2027.

==== Volumes ====
No.	Release date	ISBN
1	November 8, 2017	978-4-396-76717-4
2	May 8, 2018	978-4-396-76733-4
3	November 8, 2018	978-4-396-76749-5
4	April 27, 2019	978-4-396-76764-8
5	December 7, 2019	978-4-396-76775-4
6	August 6, 2020	978-4-396-76800-3
7	February 8, 2021	978-4-396-76816-4
8	October 8, 2021	978-4-396-76842-3
9	April 25, 2022	978-4-396-76855-3
10	February 8, 2023	978-4-396-76876-8
11	August 8, 2023	978-4-396-76893-5

=== Live-action film ===
In June 2023, it was announced that the series would receive a live-action film adaptation, directed by Natsuki Seta and starring Yui Aragaki as Makio Kōdai. For the film, Eriko Hashimoto wrote and composed the in-story song "Asa no Uta" (あさのうた; lit. 'Asa's Song'), while Toaka performed the song "Yoake no Anata e" (夜明けのあなたへ; lit. 'To You at Daybreak'). It premiered in Japanese theaters on June 7, 2024.

=== Anime ===
An anime television series was announced in May 2024. It is produced by Shuka and directed by Miyuki Oshiro, with scripts written by Kōhei Kiyasu, characters designed by Kenji Hayama, and music composed by Kensuke Ushio. It was broadcast from January 4 to March 29, 2026, on BS Asahi's Anime A programming block and other networks. The opening theme song is "Sonare" (ソナーレ), performed by Tomoo, and the ending theme song is "Kotozute" (言伝; lit. 'Hearsay'), performed by Bialystocks.

Crunchyroll is streaming the series. Plus Media Networks Asia licensed the series in Southeast Asia and broadcasts it on Aniplus Asia.

==== Episodes ====
No.	Title	Directed by	Written by	Storyboarded by	Original release date
1	"Overflow"; Transliteration: "Afureru" (Japanese: 溢(あふ)れる)	Miyuki Oshiro	Kōhei Kiyasu	Miyuki Oshiro	January 4, 2026
Makio Kōdai hears the news about a car accident involving her older sister. While waiting for the autopsy, Makio is asked to take in her niece, Asa Takumi, who became orphaned due to both her parents dying as a result of the accident. After an awkward conversation, Makio suggests for Asa to keep her own journal. On their first morning living together, Asa notices how untidy Makio keeps her living space. She decides to keep a journal as suggested, but Asa struggles to write an entry. A flashback to the funeral of Asa's parents suggests that Makio's indifference to their deaths was genuine, but she declared that she would respect Asa's feelings. Asa accepted being taken in, and as a result, Makio pulled her out of the funeral before it was due to end.
2	"Wrap"; Transliteration: "Tsutsumu" (Japanese: 包む)	Ryōko Nakano	Kōhei Kiyasu	Ryōko Nakano	January 11, 2026
Makio invites her extroverted friend, Nana Daigo, to her flat. Nana sees Asa for the first time as an orphan, as well as her less-than-satisfactory interactions with Makio. As a result, she gets Asa and Makio to work together to cook dumplings for dinner. During dinner, Asa reveals her own struggle with replying back to her own friend for the first time since losing her parents. After hearing from Makio and Nana, she decides to reply with "I'm okay". Before Nana leaves, she suggests for Makio to reach out to her ex-boyfriend, Shingo Kasamachi. Makio does so the following day; Shingo rules out getting back with Makio and instead points her to filing a petition for guardianship in order to claim life insurance from Asa's parents. Nevertheless, Shingo expresses an interest in meeting Asa. Upon returning home, Makio catches Asa reading one of her publications.
3	"Discard"; Transliteration: "Suteru" (Japanese: 捨てる)	Hisanori Kobayashi	Kōhei Kiyasu	Katsumi Terahigashi	January 18, 2026
Makio and Asa visit the apartment that Asa used to live in with her late parents. They pack Asa's belongings to move to Makio's flat. A few days later, Asa is ready to graduate from middle school, but at the ceremony, her friend Emiri Nara apologizes for leaking the truth, such that everyone at middle school now knows that Asa's parents died. Asa storms out of middle school as a result, but loses her way home. She messages Makio, who finds her and takes her home. Makio reveals that she did not care much for her middle-school graduation ceremony, but is grateful for her friendship with Nana, which has lasted since middle school. Makio reveals a letter that Nana wrote to her during high-school graduation. Asa therefore decides to reconcile with Emiri and ask to talk to her regarding her parents.
4	"Cower"; Transliteration: "Sukumu" (Japanese: 竦(すく)む)	Miyuki Oshiro & Satomi Nakamura	Kōhei Kiyasu	Miyuki Oshiro	January 25, 2026
Makio meets up with Nana and several other friends for dinner, in which they also talk about Makio's new living arrangements with Asa. On a subsequent day, Shingo visits Asa for the first time at Makio's apartment. When Makio goes out to buy milk, Shingo briefly reminisces in front of Asa. Shingo and Makio arrange to supply Asa with enough bento lunch for her upcoming days in high school. On her first day in high school, Asa is reunited with Emiri and several others from her old middle school, but after bringing up her orphan status to other new students, fails to make new friends. Upon returning home, Asa finds out that Makio refuses to reveal why she hates Asa's mother. On a day after that, Emiri goes to hang out with Asa at Makio's flat. After Asa falls asleep again, Emiri reports this to Makio and leaves. Makio later hears Asa cry, and tries to reassure her that she accepts Asa's loneliness even if she struggles to understand why. A few hours later, while discussing Asa's living arrangements over the phone, Makio asks Shingo about whether he has felt lonely.
5	"Decide"; Transliteration: "Erabu" (Japanese: 選ぶ)	Mitsuki Kitamura	Kōhei Kiyasu	Ryōko Nakano	February 1, 2026
While choosing to join an after-school club, Asa realizes that her mother used to make many decisions for her. Asa later visits her grandmother's place where Makio used to live as a child. Makio immediately goes to her old room and reminisces. Asa later goes to check on Makio, who had moved to her late sister's (Asa's mother's) old room. After Makio leaves, Asa finds out more about her mother's interests. On another day at school, Asa notices Emiri's hesitation with being asked out by a male classmate. At the same time, Makio is at the publishing house finalizing details for her next volume of her publication. Makio and Asa return home later that day, but at the door is Kazunari Tōno, a legal representative who had tried to contact Makio several times. He asks Makio to explain a withdrawal of 300,000 yen from Asa's bank account. Eventually, Asa speaks up, saying that she withdrew the money herself to buy a Mac and make music on it. The admission leaves Asa in tears. Kazunari gives Asa his contact detail just before he leaves, but almost causes a misunderstanding with the arriving Shingo. Afterwards, Asa decides to join the after-school band club.
6	"Overlap"; Transliteration: "Kasanaru" (Japanese: 重なる)	Tomomi Kiwatsumi	Kōhei Kiyasu	Kotomi Deai	February 8, 2026
On the first day of summer break, Asa gets into another row with Makio over the latter's untidiness. A few days later, Makio forgets that she agreed to let Emiri visit Asa. During her visit, Emiri asks about Makio's love life. Makio dodges her questions but later sends a text to Shingo by accident. Before Emiri leaves, Makio lends her a DVD for the film Fried Green Tomatoes. Makio later goes to a Chinese restaurant with Shingo before going with him for a walk to the nearby park. Makio narrowly backs out of sharing a kiss with Shingo, as she is still conflicted over her feelings for him. Shingo insists that they can remain friends who depend on each other in times of need.
7	"Leave in Writing"; Transliteration: "Kakinokosu" (Japanese: 書き残す)	Shinya Kiwatsura	Kōhei Kiyasu	Shinya Kiwatsura	February 15, 2026
Makio and Asa meet Emiri and her mother Michiko at a restaurant, where Asa and Emiri are seated separately so Michiko can speak with Makio. Elsewhere, Nana and Shingo meet, and Shingo explains his career change from banking while mentioning the lawyer involved in Makio's guardianship of Asa. Makio admits to Michiko that she is forgetful despite deciding to take Asa in. After Asa and Emiri leave to shop for swimsuits, Makio inquires about Asa's mother, Minori. Michiko recalls Minori's high standards and notes that she only learned after Minori's death that Minori never legally married Asa's father. Asa learns that Emiri keeps her love life private. That evening, Shingo brings his mother's bento notes to Makio's apartment; though she initially refuses, Makio reads them and realizes Minori wrote something similar for Asa. Returning home, Asa overhears Makio and Shingo talk about her mother's journal and begins to resent her. After school the next day, Asa prepares to move out but finds Minori's journal in a bag. A flashback reveals Makio's resentment toward Minori for gossiping. It shows Minori had nothing to look forward to except motherhood and accepted her partner's help despite their unmarried status. Realizing her mother wrote the entry before she was born, Asa's resentment intensifies.
8	"Wander"; Transliteration: "Samayou" (Japanese: 彷徨(さまよ)う)	Tomomi Kawatsuma	Kōhei Kiyasu	Tomomi Kawatsuma	February 22, 2026
As requested by her homeroom teacher, Emiri calls Makio to inform her of Asa's absence from school. Makio replies that she will look for Asa. She ends up asking Kazunari and Shingo for help to find Asa as well. They eventually find her outside a bubble tea café. Asa's outburst continues towards Makio and Shingo as Kazunari drives them home. Upon their return, Makio suggests that Asa did grow up with her mother's love, regardless of Makio's own distance from her family. Makio also says that she has experienced grief, but intends not to share it with anyone. Later that night, Asa finds one of Makio's previous novels next to her bed, and decides to read it. Hearing Asa cry and accept the loss of her parents, Makio goes over to comfort her.
9	"Intersect"; Transliteration: "Majiwaru" (Japanese: 交わる)	Takahiro Ōmori & Daiki Nishida	Kōhei Kiyasu	Katsumi Terahigashi	March 1, 2026
Makio remembers the time she split from Shingo, and how she was unable to explain it to her friends during a New Year's party five years ago. In the present day, Asa begins to have regular counselling at school, but struggles to speak up. On their way home from school, Asa finds out that Emiri struggles with her own career choices. Once Asa returns home, she asks Makio to review song lyrics that she wrote with her band, while also mentioning that original songs get priority for band club performances. Asa reacts with disdain over Makio's vague review. Over the next few days, Asa notices Makio distancing herself, and mentions this to Shingo on his next visit. Shingo, upon noticing Makio crawl out of her room, senses that she has writer's block, and arranges the visit of a novelist named Juno. When Emiri visits for a Christmas party on December 20 and asks for guidance on her own career path, Makio starts recalling the conversation she had with Juno, as well as what Shingo told her regarding his parents' disapproval of his banking job. Asa also recalls Juno's visit, in which Juno appeared to ridicule Asa's height. Afterwards, it is revealed that Makio only finished her latest work on the night before Emiri's visit. Before Asa's first day back at school after the New Year, she brushes off Makio's query about her song lyrics. This makes Makio wonder about her own life.
10	"Bind"; Transliteration: "Shibaru" (Japanese: 縛る)	Kaori	Kōhei Kiyasu	Kaori	March 8, 2026
On the way to school, Asa finds out that Emiri has chosen a science course for her following year. After returning home to Makio, who had forgotten about Asa's birthday, Makio instead proposes a celebration of the anniversary of Asa moving in, but is also accepting of Asa honoring the anniversary of her parents' deaths. On a subsequent day, Makio talks to Juno and requests an old photo of hers. After looking at the photos she took of Asa over the past year, Makio is suddenly reminded of her own past. Meanwhile, Asa finds out that her band club are holding auditions for a lead singer, and is disappointed with two of her bandmates not putting an effort to write an original song with her, despite her own lack of ideas. On another day, Emiri meets up with another friend of hers at a restaurant. Emiri remembers being told of the deaths of Asa's parents by a text from Asa herself, and being unable to let go of her friendship with Asa as a result. Asa gets increasingly suspicious over Emiri's lack of response to her texts. On the following day, Asa decides not to audition for the singing role at her band club, choosing instead to learn bass guitar.
11	"Set Free"; Transliteration: "Tokihanatsu" (Japanese: 解き放つ)	Takahiro Ōmori, Mitsuki Kitamura & Daiki Nishida	Kōhei Kiyasu	Katsumi Terahigashi	March 15, 2026
It is revealed that Asa has been writing in her journal, a list of words that Makio uses. One day, she shares her findings with a classmate. Asa then recalls one of her last conversations with her parents, regarding her hairstyle. On Valentine's Day, while meeting with her editor at the publishing house, Makio is given a small chocolate gift. She later meets Shingo at a restaurant. Later, Asa skips band club practice to go home, and is shocked to see Makio handing over a box of chocolate that she says is from Shingo. The following day, Asa receives a belated chocolate gift from the same classmate as before, then hears about Chise's continued absence over the university application scandal. Asa returns home to Makio video-calling another of her friends, who was picking out Makio's outfit for her upcoming book signing. Makio's friend offers to listen to Asa's troubles. After hearing Asa, Makio's friend parts with some words of wisdom, which Makio herself appears to agree with. Asa therefore requests to sing for Makio and her friend. Afterwards, Makio reminds Asa that the decision to join the after-school band club was her own.
12	"Find"; Transliteration: "Mitsukeru" (Japanese: 見つける)	Noriko Hashimoto	Kōhei Kiyasu	Noriko Hashimoto	March 22, 2026
Remembering what Makio and her friend said about standing out, Asa changes her mind and decides to audition for the singing role at her school's band club. On a subsequent day, while Makio meets Michiko for a meal, Kazunari has a chance encounter with Shingo, and uses it to share a conversation he had with Asa regarding her future. Kazunari also finds out that he has a lot in common with Shingo regarding the societal pressures placed on them. On a subsequent day, it is implied that Asa passed the audition and now attends her band club for vocal warmup sessions. Asa asks Makio for advice on how she can get better at writing lyrics. Makio points Asa to her journal for a place to start. As the second year of high school approaches for Asa, she shows off a newly-decorated space in Makio's wardrobe, which impresses Makio. Asa also asks to honor her parents on their birthdays, since their birthdays were three days apart, and she would rather not honor them on the day of their deaths.
13	"Morning is Here"; Transliteration: "Ashita ga Kuru" (Japanese: 朝(あした)が来る)	Miyuki Oshiro	Kōhei Kiyasu	Miyuki Oshiro	March 29, 2026
On the first day of the new academic year, Asa encounters Chise on the way to school. She tries persuading Chise to watch her performance with the school band the following day. Makio does her best to settle Asa's nerves on the morning before the performance, which would take place at the courtyard of the school grounds. Asa's bandmates also encourage her before the performance. She remembers her late parents' words, then admits to her bandmates that she wants to sing for a downhearted friend of hers. The band's performance is applauded after the first song, but only after the performance of all of their songs does Chise call out to Asa to acknowledge her presence, before leaving. Makio also witnesses Asa's performance through a recording sent over by Emiri. Over the coming days, the band club receives new recruits, one of them inspired by Asa's performance. Asa ends one of those days with a celebration of her late parents' birthdays at Makio's apartment. Ten years later, Emiri brings up Asa's performance by showing her the recording of it, and asks to see how Makio is doing.

== Reception ==
=== Accolades ===
In 2019, the manga was nominated for the 12th Manga Taishō and ranked fourth with 45 points; in 2020, it was nominated for the 13th award and ranked tenth with 31 points. On Takarajimasha's Kono Manga ga Sugoi! list of best manga of 2019 for female readers, the series ranked fourth; it ranked tenth on the 2020 list; and fifth on the 2024 list. It ranked 17th in the 2019 Next Manga Award in the print category. The series topped the 2023 "Book of the Year" list by Da Vinci magazine. The series was nominated for the 28th Tezuka Osamu Cultural Prize in 2024. The anime series won one of the four monthly Galaxy Awards for March 2026.

=== Critical reception ===
The anime adaptation received overwhelmingly positive reviews. All four reviewers from Anime News Network (ANN) gave the premiere a perfect or near-perfect score; Caitlin Moore, writing the lead review, called it "so beautiful, so stunningly made in every dimension, that words fail me". Allyson Johnson of In Between Drafts wrote that the show was "poised to be ... a critical triumph", while Tony Prickett of Anime Feminist stated that it was "hard to overstate how much I recommend it". Sylvia Jones of ANN described it as "pull[ing] the weight of several equivalent series with the amount of confidence and craft on display" and a potential contender for one of the best shows of the year. Several reviewers named the show as being the best of the Winter 2026 season.

The story and writing were widely praised, with James Beckett of ANN voicing his enjoyment of the "honest, pure reality" of a "deceptively simple human drama". Johnson concurred, acclaiming the writing as "extraordinary" in its characterization. Jones opined that the story's nonlinear narrative was particularly effective in setting up a climax in the premiere episode, while Richard Eisenbeis of ANN commended the pacing through "visual metaphors and tightly-written conversation". David Wilson of IndieWire praised the show for its character writing, stating that it "proves [adroit]" in expanding its cast while also "never losing sight" of the central characters. Eljiah Gonzalez of The A.V. Club wrote that it "rejected everything simplistic and superficial" in favor of having "depth and humanity".

Many critics commented positively on the story's emotional themes, with several mentioning that the show brought them to tears. Rebecca Silverman of ANN described the show as an "exploration ... of feeling at sea in the world" that was "resonant and quietly comforting". Jones felt that the story had a "quiet emotional intelligence" and was ultimately "one of the precious few anime" written for a more mature audience, while Prickett contended that the show "sp[oke] profoundly to the human condition, intimacy, and ambiguities of grief". David Opie of GamesRadar+ praised the series as having "great poignancy" and a "soft emotional intelligence", concluding that it was a "unique marvel [and] a one-of-a-kind masterpiece".

The production value was well-received. Moore acclaimed the "sheer beauty in every frame of animation, every line spoken, every note of music", concluding that it "may be the most powerful thing you'll watch all year". Similarly, Prickett considered the story "exquisitely boarded, perfectly edited, and loaded with meaning", with praise for "painstakingly animated" moments. Johnson called the animation "superb" in its style and coloring, while Wilson opined that it "further[s] the show's down-to-earth, realistic tone". Jones commended the show's voice acting, calling Miyuki Sawashiro, Makio's voice actor, a "generational talent" with "impeccable" chemistry with Fuko Mori, who voices Asa. Lewis Parker of Kotaku concurred, praising the two voice actors as "giving the best performances" of the season.
