= The Night Beyond the Tricornered Window =

Japanese manga series

- Cover of the Japanese version of vol. 1, first published on February 10, 2014

さんかく窓の外側は夜 (Sankaku Mado no Sotogawa wa Yoru)
- Genre: Supernatural; Mystery; Boys' love
- Manga
- Written by: Tomoko Yamashita
- Published by: Libre
- English publisher: NA: SuBLime
- Imprint: Kurofune Comics
- Magazine: Magazine Be × Boy
- Original run: March 7, 2013 – December 7, 2020
- Volumes: 10
- Live-action film
- Directed by: Yukihiro Morigaki
- Written by: Tomoko Aizawa
- Music by: yuma yamaguchi
- Studio: Shochiku
- Released: January 22, 2021
- Runtime: 102 minutes
- Anime television series
- Directed by: Daiji Iwanaga (Chief); Yoshitaka Yasuda
- Written by: Ayumi Sekine
- Music by: Evan Call
- Studio: Zero-G
- Licensed by: Crunchyroll
- Original network: Tokyo MX, SUN, BS Fuji
- Original run: October 3, 2021 – December 19, 2021
- Episodes: 12

The Night Beyond the Tricornered Window (Japanese: さんかく窓の外側は夜, Hepburn: Sankaku Mado no Sotogawa wa Yoru) is a Japanese manga series written and illustrated by Tomoko Yamashita. It was serialized in the monthly boys' love manga magazine Magazine Be × Boy from March 7, 2013, to December 7, 2020. A live-action film adaptation was released on January 22, 2021, and an anime television series adaptation by Zero-G aired from October to December 2021.

== Plot ==
Kosuke Mikado, a bookstore clerk, is able to see ghosts since he was young, which terrifies him. One day, he meets Rihito Hiyakawa, a fearless exorcist who lacks social boundaries. Hiyakawa is able to see and exorcise ghosts by entering Mikado's body and requests him to become his assistant. As the two work closely together, they learn that the supernatural incidents are closely tied with a high school student named Erika Hiura, who works as a mercenary necromancer to cast curses on other people. As Mikado and Hiyakawa investigate, Mikado begins realizing that Hiyakawa is hiding a secret.

== Characters ==
Kosuke Mikado (三角 康介, Mikado Kōsuke)
Voiced by: Haruki Ishiya (drama CD), Nobunaga Shimazaki (anime)
Played by: Jun Shison
Rihito Hiyakawa (冷川 理人, Hiyakawa Rihito)
Voiced by: Taito Ban (drama CD), Wataru Hatano (anime)
Played by: Masaki Okada
Erika Hiura (非浦 英莉可, Hiura Erika)
Voiced by: Chika Anzai (anime)
Played by: Yurina Hirate
Keita Mukae (迎 系多, Mukae Keita)
Voiced by: Soma Saito (anime)
Hiroki Hanzawa (半澤 日路輝, Hanzawa Hiroki)
Voiced by: Satoshi Mikami (anime)
Portrayed by: Kenichi Takita
Kazuomi Sakaki (逆木 一臣, Sakaki Kazuomi)
Voiced by: Junichi Suwabe (anime)
Portrayed by: Shinya Niiro

== Development ==
In 2021, Yamashita stated that she initially wrote The Night Beyond the Tricornered Window as a short story before it became serialized. Yamashita also affirmed that while she did see feedback from others that Hiyakawa and Mikado could be considered a reversible pairing, she intended for Hiyakawa to be the top in their relationship. In addition, she stated that she focuses on the surrounding environment and characters besides the main couple. Yamashita also said that she wanted to include heterosexual romance in her boys' love works and she was surprised that she received positive feedback on chapters that focused on Erika and Sasaki's romance, as well as Mikado's parents, despite the story being serialized in a boys' love magazine. She claimed that she initially wrote Erika and Mukae as characters who would lure Hiyakawa and Mikado into temptation, but she changed her mind after realizing how "sad" it would be if her characters had an "unhappy" role. Yamashita also stated that she includes diversity into her works, such as including female police officers with male police officers.

== Media ==
=== Manga ===
The Night Beyond the Tricornered Window is written and illustrated by Tomoko Yamashita. It is her longest work to date. It was serialized in the monthly boys' love manga magazine Magazine Be × Boy from March 7, 2013, in the April 2013 issue to December 7, 2020, in the January 2021 issue. The chapters were later released in eight bound volumes by Libre under the Kurofune Comics imprint. Volume 2 was sold with a bonus illustration card with purchase through Amazon.

In September 2014, Viz Media announced at Yaoi-Con that they licensed the series for North American distribution in English under their SuBLime imprint, releasing it in digital format.

No.	Original release date	Original ISBN	English release date	English ISBN
1	February 10, 2014	978-4-7997-1436-2	March 24, 2015	978-1-4215-8219-1
2	February 10, 2015	978-4-7997-2487-3	November 24, 2015	978-1-4215-8649-6
3	March 10, 2016	978-4-7997-2894-9	November 22, 2016	978-1-4215-9549-8
4	December 10, 2016	978-4-7997-3163-5	December 26, 2017	978-1-9747-0129-2
5	August 10, 2017	978-4-7997-3436-0	August 24, 2018	978-1-9747-0560-3
6	July 10, 2018	978-4-7997-3924-2	October 22, 2019	978-1-9747-1429-2
7	April 10, 2019	978-4-7997-4285-3	October 27, 2020	978-1-9747-2335-5
8	February 10, 2020	978-4-7997-4285-3	July 27, 2021	978-1-9747-2593-9
9	September 10, 2020	978-4-7997-4921-0	October 26, 2021	978-1-9747-2733-9
10	March 10, 2021	978-4-7997-5166-4	March 22, 2022	978-1-9747-3177-0

=== Drama CD ===
An audio drama CD adaptation was released on April 10, 2019, with the release of volume 7 in Japan, starring Haruki Ishiya as Kosuke Mikado and Taito Ban as Rihito Hiyakawa. A second drama CD was released on February 10, 2020, with the release of volume 8, featuring an original story.

=== Film ===
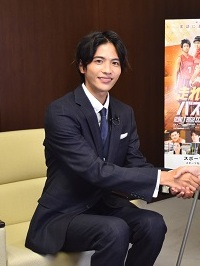
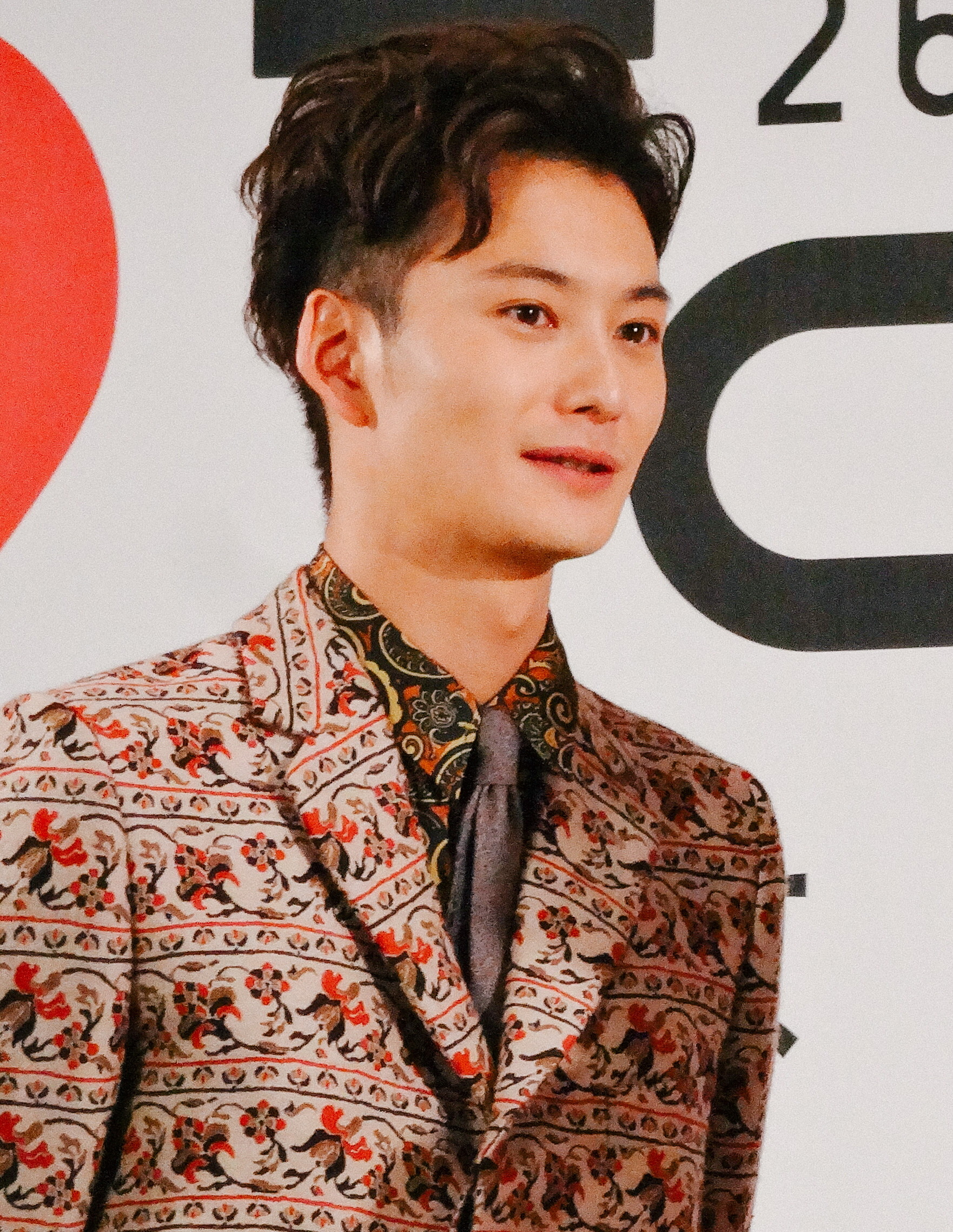
Jun Shison (left, 2018) and Masaki Okada (right, 2013) portrayed Kosuke and Hiyakawa respectively in the live-action film.

A live-action film adaptation was announced in January 2020, starring Jun Shison as Kosuke Mikado, Masaki Okada as Rihito Hiyakawa, and Yurina Hirate as Erika Hiura. The film is directed by Yukihiro Morigaki and written by Tomoko Aizawa. The release date was originally announced as October 30, 2020, but it was delayed to January 22, 2021, due to the COVID-19 pandemic. Yuki Sakurai, Kenichi Takita, Emi Wakui, Makita Sports, Michitaka Tsutsui, and Shinya Niiro were announced as additional cast members in March 2020. Keiko Kitagawa also appears in a minor role in the film as a lawyer. The film's theme song is "Darken" by Zutomayo, and their song "Hypersomnia" is also featured in the film. The soundtrack is composed by Yuma Yamaguchi.

=== Anime ===
An anime television series adaptation of The Night Beyond the Tricornered Window was announced in the January 2021 issue of Magazine Be × Boy, published on December 7, 2020. The anime is produced by Zero-G and is directed by Yoshitaka Yasuda, who will also be in charge of character design. Daiji Iwanaga is the chief director for the series, with Ayumi Sekine in charge of the series' scripts, and Evan Call composing the series' music. It aired from October 3 to December 19, 2021, on Tokyo MX, SUN, and BS Fuji. Frederic performed the opening theme "Saika", while Wataru Hatano performed the ending theme "Breakers". Crunchyroll streamed the series.

==== Episode list ====
No.	Title	Directed by (Note: Information is taken from the ending credits of each episode.)	Written by	Storyboarded by	Original release date
1	"Encounter"; Transliteration: "Deai" (Japanese: 出逢)	Daiji Iwanaga	Ayumi Sekine	Daiji Iwanaga	October 3, 2021
2	"Binding"; Transliteration: "Sokubaku" (Japanese: 束縛)	Masaki Utsunomiya	Katsuhiko Takayama	Miyana Okita	October 10, 2021
3	"Malediction"; Transliteration: "Juso" (Japanese: 呪詛)	Tōru Kitahata	Tomoko Konparu	Yoshitaka Yasuda	October 17, 2021
4	"Pitfall"; Transliteration: "Kansei" (Japanese: 陥穽)	Tomoya Takayama	Katsuhiko Takayama	Tatsuya Abe	October 24, 2021
5	"Past"; Transliteration: "Kako" (Japanese: 過去)	Daiji Iwanaga	Tomoko Konparu	Miyana Okita	October 31, 2021
6	"(dis)belief" Transliteration: "Shingi" (Japanese: 信疑)	Kaoru Suzuki	Ayumi Sekine	Yōichi Ueda	November 7, 2021
7	"Atonement"; Transliteration: "Shokuzai" (Japanese: 贖罪)	Fumihiro Matsui	Katsuhiko Takayama	Katsuyuki Kodera	November 14, 2021
8	"Loneliness"; Transliteration: "Kodoku" (Japanese: 孤独)	Masahiro Takata	Tomoko Konparu	Katsuyuki Kodera	November 21, 2021
9	"Confluence"; Transliteration: "Kōsaku" (Japanese: 交錯)	Akiko Nakano	Katsuhiko Takayama	Kiyoko Sayama	November 28, 2021
10	"Resolve"; Transliteration: "Kakugo" (Japanese: 覚悟)	Tatsuya Abe	Tomoko Konparu	Tatsuya Abe	December 5, 2021
11	"Confrontation"; Transliteration: "Taiji" (Japanese: 対峙)	Daiji Iwanaga	Ayumi Sekine	Miyana Okita	December 12, 2021
12	"Destiny"; Transliteration: "Unmei" (Japanese: 運命)	Kaoru Suzuki	Ayumi Sekine	Yōichi Ueda	December 19, 2021

== Reception ==
The Night Beyond the Tricornered Window has sold a cumulative total of 1 million physical copies in Japan by January 2020. Volume 1 peaked at No. 14 on Oricon and sold a total of 24,718 physical copies on its first week of sales. Volume 2 peaked at No. 16 on Oricon and sold a total of 27,201 physical copies on its first week of sales. Volume 3 peaked at No. 36 on Oricon and sold a total of 22,680 physical copies on its first week of sales. Volume 4 sold a cumulative total of 30,196 physical copies on its first two weeks of sales. Volume 5 peaked at No. 48 on Oricon and sold a total of 17,710 physical copies on its first week of sales. Volume 6 peaked at No. 48 on Oricon and sold a total of 19,918 physical copies on its first week of sales.

Rebecca Silverman from Anime News Network cites the horror and mystery plot as the series' greatest strength and that the lesser focus on romance may make it easier for readers who are not interested in boys' love. However, she also claims the romance has creepy undertones.

For the live-action film, Mark Schilling from The Japan Times gave it 3 out of 5 stars, describing it "absurd" but praising Hirate's acting.
