= Tomoko Yamashita =

Japanese manga artist

- ヤマシタ トモコ
- Born: May 9, 1981 (age 45)
- Occupation: Manga artist
- Years active: 2005–present

Tomoko Yamashita (Japanese: ヤマシタ トモコ, Hepburn: Yamashita Tomoko; born May 9, 1981) is a Japanese manga artist.

== Career ==
Yamashita started publishing doujinshi in the early 2000s and won the newcomers prize Afternoon Shiki Shō of the manga magazine Monthly Afternoon in 2005 with a short story.

She started her career by publishing Boys Love manga. In 2007, her manga Dining Bar Akira was ranked first in the Kono Manga ga Sugoi! survey in the category Boys Love. This manga and the short story collection Black-Winged Love were published in English by Netcomics as books, several more of her early works also in digital form.

Yamashita has published her work across the classical gendered spectrum of the Japanese manga industry. Her work appears in Boys Love magazines and josei magazines like Feel Young, but also in seinen magazines like Monthly Afternoon.

The manga Her was the highest ranked manga for female readers in the 2010 Kono Manga ga Sugoi! survey.

The manga series The Night Beyond the Tricornered Window, which she published from 2013 until 2020 in Magazine Be × Boy, is her biggest success so far. It was adapted into an anime series and a live-action film. The series was sold more than one million times and translated into several languages.

Her series Ikoku Nikki has been ranked high on the Kono Manga ga Sugoi! survey and has been nominated for the Manga Taishō award in 2019 and 2020.

In 2021, Yamashita acknowledged her works have become more politically progressive and she states she was influenced by overseas films. She also stated that she felt a lot of Japanese creative works favored the viewpoints of men, even in yaoi, where female characters are often seen as obstacles for male relationships. To mitigate that, she tried to introduce diversity in subtle ways, such as drawing female police officers with male police officers. Yamashita also declared on Twitter she is no longer using language derogatory towards minorities, such as "homo" (ホモ), in her works.

On January 4, 2026, Yamashita began serializing a new webcomic, Tatsumaki (or "tornado"), on the website Our Feel, a counterpart to the magazine Feel Young.

== Works ==
- Dining Bar Akira (くいもの処明楽, Kuimonodokoro Akira; 2007)
- Illumination (イルミナシオン; 2008)
- I want a Love Story (恋の話がしたい, Koi no Hanashi ga Shitai; 2008)
- Black-Winged Love (恋の心に黒い羽, Koi no Kokoro ni Kuroi Hane; 2008)
- Don't Cry, Girl (ドントクライ、ガール; 2008–2009)
- Mo'some Sting (モーサム スティング; 2009)
- Her (2009–2010)
- BUTTER!!! (2010–2013)
- The Night Beyond the Tricornered Window (さんかく窓の外側は夜, Sankaku Mado no Sotogawa wa Yoru; 2013–2020)
- Hanaizawa-chō Kōminkan Dayori (花井沢町公民館便り; 2014–2016)
- Ikoku Nikki (違国日記; 2017–2023)
- Tatsumaki (竜巻; 2025–present)
