= Sakurazaka46 =

Japanese idol group

- Also known as: Keyakizaka46
- Origin: Tokyo, Japan
- Genre: J-pop
- Years active: 2015–present (Note: As Keyakizaka46 2015–2020 and as Sakurazaka46 2020–present)
- Label: Sony Music
- Spinoffs: Hinatazaka46
- Spinoff of: Sakamichi Series
- Members: See members
- Website: www.sakurazaka46.com

Sakurazaka46 (櫻坂46; Sakurazaka Forty-six), formerly Keyakizaka46 (欅坂46; Keyakizaka Forty-six), is a Japanese idol girl group produced by Yasushi Akimoto. The group was created on August 21, 2015, becoming Nogizaka46's first sister group under the Sakamichi Series. The group was rebranded as Sakurazaka46 after their last concert on October 13, 2020. The group's fans are known as Buddies.

As Keyakizaka46, the group had released nine singles, eight of which topped the Oricon Singles Chart and Billboard Japan Hot 100. The group had also released three compilation albums, one of which was released by Hiragana Keyakizaka46, a subgroup who later became an independent group, Hinatazaka46. Additionally, the group hosts multiple variety shows, radio programs, and television dramas.

== History ==
=== 2015: Formation ===
Logo of Keyakizaka46

On February 22, 2015, during the Nogizaka46 3rd Year Birthday Live at Seibu Dome, Nogizaka46 announced plans to recruit the first generation members for their new project. The new group's name was Toriizaka46 (鳥居坂46), named after the Toriizaka area in the Roppongi district of Minato, Tokyo, and the recruitment was started on July 28. The final stage of the audition took place on August 21, the same day Nogizaka46 was created four years earlier, and 22 were selected out of 22,509 candidates. At the same time, the group's name was suddenly changed to Keyakizaka46; however, its reason is unclear. Furthermore, two members, Mizuho Suzuki and Mayu Harada, left the group before their first performance, bringing the total number of members to 20.

Similar to Nogizaka46, Keyakizaka46 began airing a television show on October 4 titled Keyakitte, Kakenai? (欅って、書けない?; So, can you write 'keyaki'?) on TV Tokyo. On November 29, the show announced a new member, Neru Nagahama. Nagahama had passed the auditions but did not join due to her parents' objections. She debuted as the first member of a newly-formed subgroup called Hiragana Keyakizaka46 (けやき坂46) and auditions for more members started soon after.

On December 16, the group gave its first live performance at Fuji TV's music show FNS Music Festival. The center position in the choreography was held by the youngest member Yurina Hirate, being 14 at the time.

=== 2016–2017: Early success ===
On April 6, 2016, the group debuted their first single, Silent Majority. All members except Nagahama were selected to perform in the title song. It sold 261,580 copies in the first week and ranked first on the Oricon weekly chart. The single also broke the debut week sales record for female artists, previously held by HKT48 with their single Suki! Suki! Skip!.

Between April and May, eighteen people auditioning for Hiragana Keyakizaka46 live streamed on Showroom as part of the audition process. Eleven of those passed and became official members, joining Nagahama. The expanded subunit debuted with "Hiragana Keyaki" as part of Keyakizaka46's second single, Sekai ni wa Ai Shika Nai.

Keyakizaka46's first featured drama Tokuyama Daigorō o Dare ga Koroshitaka? premiered on the TX network on July 16, 2016. Sekai ni wa Ai Shika Nai was used as the theme song. The group was also featured in KeyaBingo!, a variety show similar to AKBingo! and NogiBingo!

2016 marked the first time the group appeared on NHK Kōhaku Uta Gassen, an event that the group participated in every year since. Additionally, Mizuho Habu became the first member to make a runway debut, appearing in GirlsAward 2016 Spring/Summer. Three more members, Hirate, Yui Kobayashi, and Risa Watanabe, would later make their debuts in GirlsAward 2016 Autumn/Winter.

In January 2017, Yūka Sugai and Akane Moriya were pointed as captain and vice-captain of the group, respectively. In July, Hiragana Keyakizaka46 added a second generation, with nine new members. The subgroup was featured on Re:Mind, a TV thriller series aired on Netflix. In August, Keyakizaka46 made their first performance at the Rock in Japan Festival, and have appeared in every year since.

=== 2018–2020: Member departures and rebranding ===
In November 2018, Yui Imaizumi became the first member to leave the group, intending to pursue other forms of entertainment. Afterwards, Nanami Yonetani, Manaka Shida and Nagahama also left the group. Meanwhile, on November 29, 2018, Nogizaka46 and Keyakizaka46 held a joint audition, where thirty-six people passed. Out of those members, eleven went to Nogizaka46, nine went to Kanji Keyakizaka46, one went to Hiragana Keyakizaka46, and the remaining fifteen became kenshūsei (研修生; lit. trainees) that are not assigned to any group. Shortly afterwards, Hiragana Keyakizaka46 formed an independent group known as Hinatazaka46, and released their debut single, "Kyun", on March 27, 2019.

During this time, Keyakizaka46 still held multiple concerts, including their largest one September 18–19, 2019 at Tokyo Dome, attracting roughly 50,000 fans per day. On September 24, a rhythm game titled Uni's On Air was released that featured Keyakizaka46 and Hinatazaka46.

Keyakizaka46, for the very first time, applied the senbatsu (selection of members) system for their 9th single during Keyakitte, Kakenai? on September 8, 2019. The senbatsu included 17 members, with Hirate at the center position. The single was originally set to be released at the end of the year, before first being delayed due to production issues, and then further delayed with the sudden departure of Hirate in January 2020, the 9th single's planned center.

On February 16, 2020, the kenshūsei members were assigned to their respective Sakamichi Series group through Showroom, with six of these members becoming part of Keyakizaka46's second generation.

On July 16, 2020, Keyakizaka46 live streamed a concert titled Keyakizaka46 Live Online, but with YOU! The concert was the first one held since their Tokyo Dome concert in September 2019 and the first without Hirate. During the concert, the group unveiled their last single "Dare ga Sono Kane o Narasu no ka?", which was released digitally only on August 21, with every single member being featured in the song. Additionally, captain Sugai announced that Keyakizaka46 was ending its five year journey and its members were starting over under a new name, with a final concert planned in October. On September 21, Sakurazaka46 was announced as their new name, with the change occurring after their last concert on October 12 and 13. Sakurazaka46 is named after Sakurazaka street within Roppongi Hills in Minato, Tokyo, located next to Keyakizaka street. Sakura (cherry tree) is written in the kyūjitai form 櫻 instead of the more common 桜.

=== 2020–present: Restarting as Sakurazaka46, 3rd Generation and 4th Generation ===
Logo of Sakurazaka46

Following their farewell concert on October 14, 2020, the group officially changed its name to Sakurazaka46. Their weekly variety show Keyakitte, Kakenai? was renamed to Soko Magattara, Sakurazaka?. Their first single under the new name, Nobody's Fault, was released on December 9, with only 14 members performing in the title track. Additionally, this single saw the creation of the "Sakura Eight", the eight members in the first two rows. Members featured on Sakura Eight appear in every B-side. "Nobody's Fault" was performed in the 71st NHK Kōhaku Uta Gassen.

On January 4, 2021, Rina Matsuda replaced Moriya as vice-captain of the group; Sugai remained as captain. On March 14, Matsudaira Riko became the first second generation member to leave the group. On April 14, the 2nd single "Ban" was released. In June, the group held a three day concert called Backs Live, in which non-Sakura Eight members performed without the Sakura Eight, taking their positions. In July, Sakurazaka46 held their first joint concert with Hinatazaka46 (since Hinatazaka46's rename), W-Keyaki Fes 2021 at Fuji Q Highland. In October, Moriya and Rika Watanabe announced their departures from the group, and left on December 19 after their final concert on December 10. On November 9, 2022, Sugai left the group after their first Tokyo Dome concert as Sakurazaka46 and Matsuda succeeded her as captain.

On June 5, 2022, Sakurazaka46 announced the auditions for their third generation members, which were held from July to December 2022. 11 members passed the auditions and 9 of them were revealed during January 2023. However, due to academic commitments, the remaining two members were revealed on March 1 and 2, 2023.

On August 5, 2024, Sakurazaka46 announced the auditions for their fourth generation members. 9 members passed the auditions and were revealed during April 2025.

== Members ==
Since its founding, Sakurazaka46 has had a total of 70 members from five generations, including members from Hiragana Keyakizaka46 (now Hinatazaka46). 33 of those members are still in the group.

If second generation members are marked with an asterisk (*), it means that they joined after the initial second generation members on February 15, 2020.

Name	Birth date (age)	Prefecture of origin	Generation	Notes
Hikari Endō (遠藤光莉)*	April 17, 1999 (age 27)	Kanagawa	2	
Rei Ōzono (大園玲)*	April 18, 2000 (age 26)	Kagoshima	2	
Akiho Ōnuma (大沼晶保)*	October 12, 1999 (age 27)	Shizuoka	2	
Marino Kōsaka (幸阪茉里乃)*	December 19, 2002 (age 23)	Mie	2	
Hono Tamura (田村保乃)	October 21, 1998 (age 28)	Osaka	2	Oldest active member.
Karin Fujiyoshi (藤吉夏鈴)	August 29, 2001 (age 25)	Osaka	2	
Kira Masumoto (増本綺良)*	January 12, 2002 (age 24)	Hyōgo	2	
Rina Matsuda (松田里奈)	October 13, 1999 (age 27)	Miyazaki	2	Captain
Hikaru Morita (森田ひかる)	July 10, 2001 (age 25)	Fukuoka	2	
Rena Moriya (守屋麗奈)*	January 2, 2000 (age 26)	Tokyo	2	
Ten Yamasaki (山﨑天)	September 28, 2005 (age 21)	Osaka	2	Vice Captain
Rika Ishimori (石森璃花)	January 13, 2002 (age 24)	Gunma	3	
Riko Endō (遠藤理子)	January 9, 2006 (age 20)	Saitama	3	
Reina Odakura (小田倉麗奈)	July 25, 2004 (age 22)	Tokyo	3	
Nagisa Kojima (小島凪紗)	July 7, 2005 (age 21)	Nagano	3	
Airi Taniguchi (谷口愛季)	April 12, 2005 (age 21)	Yamaguchi	3	
Yuzuki Nakashima (中嶋優月)	February 17, 2003 (age 23)	Fukuoka	3	
Mio Matono (的野美青)	November 8, 2006 (age 20)	Fukuoka	3	
Itoha Mukai (向井純葉)	May 9, 2006 (age 20)	Hiroshima	3	
Yū Murai (村井優)	August 18, 2004 (age 22)	Tokyo	3	
Miu Murayama (村山美羽)	February 15, 2005 (age 21)	Tokyo	3	
Shizuki Yamashita (山下瞳月)	January 22, 2005 (age 21)	Kyoto	3	
Konomi Asai (浅井恋乃未)	December 22, 2004 (age 21)	Saitama	4	
Hina Inaguma (稲熊ひな)	March 9, 2006 (age 20)	Aichi	4	
Haru Katsumata (勝又春)	January 24, 2004 (age 22)	Kyoto	4	
Neo Satō (佐藤愛桜)	December 1, 2006 (age 19)	Saga	4	
Chihiro Nakagawa (中川智尋)	September 16, 2007 (age 19)	Nagasaki	4	
Wako Matsumoto (松本和子)	February 6, 2005 (age 21)	Chiba	4	
Hīro Meguro (目黒陽色)	January 24, 2006 (age 20)	Saitama	4	
Ui Yamakawa (山川宇衣)	September 19, 2005 (age 21)	Miyagi	4	
Momomi Yamada (山田桃実)	July 20, 2008 (age 18)	Okayama	4	Youngest

=== Former members ===
Name	Birth date (age)	Prefecture of origin	Generation	Notes
Mizuho Suzuki (鈴木泉帆)	October 7, 2000 (age 26)	Aichi	1	Left in September 2015 before the group officially debuted.
Mayu Harada (原田まゆ)	May 2, 1998 (age 28)	Tokyo	1	Left on November 11, 2015 after pictures of her and her boyfriend, her former middle school teacher, surfaced.
Yui Imaizumi (今泉佑唯)	September 30, 1998 (age 28)	Kanagawa	1	Graduated from Kanji Keyaki on November 3, 2018.
Manaka Shida (志田愛佳)	November 23, 1998 (age 27)	Niigata	1	Graduated from Kanji Keyaki on November 16, 2018.
Nanami Yonetani (米谷奈々未)	February 24, 2000 (age 26)	Osaka	1	Graduated from Kanji Keyaki on December 22, 2018.
Neru Nagahama (長濱ねる)	September 4, 1998 (age 28)	Nagasaki	1 (Special)	Joined on November 30, 2015 as the sole member of Hiragana Keyaki. Granted dual membership with Kanji Keyaki in June 2016. Cancelled Hiragana Keyaki membership on September 24, 2017. Graduated on July 30, 2019.
Miyu Suzumoto (鈴本美愉)	December 5, 1997 (age 28)	Aichi	1	Graduated on January 23, 2020.
Nana Oda (織田奈那)	June 4, 1998 (age 28)	Shizuoka	1	Graduated on January 23, 2020.
Yurina Hirate (平手友梨奈)	June 25, 2001 (age 25)	Aichi	1	Withdrew from group on January 23, 2020.
Nanako Nagasawa (長沢菜々香)	April 23, 1997 (age 29)	Yamagata	1	Graduated on March 31, 2020.
Nijika Ishimori (石森虹花)	May 7, 1997 (age 29)	Miyagi	1	Graduated on September 30, 2020.
Shiori Satō (佐藤詩織)	November 16, 1996 (age 29)	Tokyo	1	Graduated on October 13, 2020.
Riko Matsudaira (松平璃子)	May 5, 1998 (age 28)	Tokyo	2	First second generation member to graduate. Graduated on March 14, 2021.
Akane Moriya (守屋茜)	November 12, 1997 (age 28)	Miyagi	1	Former Vice-Captain; Graduated on December 10, 2021.
Rika Watanabe (渡辺梨加)	May 16, 1995 (age 31)	Ibaraki	1	Oldest founding member. Graduated on December 10, 2021.
Risa Watanabe (渡邉理佐)	July 27, 1998 (age 28)	Ibaraki	1	Held graduation concert on May 22, 2022.
Aoi Harada (原田葵)	May 7, 2000 (age 26)	Tokyo	1	Graduated on June 11, 2022.
Rika Ozeki (尾関梨香)	October 7, 1997 (age 29)	Kanagawa	1	Graduated on September 11, 2022.
Yūka Sugai (菅井友香)	November 29, 1995 (age 30)	Tokyo	1	Former Captain Graduated on November 9, 2022.
Yumiko Seki (関有美子)	June 29, 1998 (age 28)	Fukuoka	2	Graduated on April 30, 2023.
Mizuho Habu (土生瑞穂)	July 7, 1997 (age 29)	Tokyo	1	Graduated on November 25, 2023.
Yui Kobayashi (小林由依)	October 23, 1999 (age 27)	Saitama	1	Held graduation concert on February 1, 2024.
Fuyuka Saitō (齋藤冬優花)	February 15, 1998 (age 28)	Tokyo	1	Graduated on January 13, 2025.
Rina Uemura (上村莉菜)	January 4, 1997 (age 29)	Chiba	1	Graduated on February 28, 2025.
Minami Koike (小池美波)	November 14, 1998 (age 27)	Hyōgo	1	Last first generation member to graduate. Graduated on May 30, 2025.
Rina Inoue (井上梨名)	January 29, 2001 (age 25)	Hyōgo	2	Held graduation ceremony on December 17, 2025.
Yui Takemoto (武元唯衣)	March 23, 2002 (age 24)	Shiga	2	Held graduation ceremony on May 13, 2026.

== Discography ==
=== Studio albums ===
List of studio albums, with selected chart positions, sales and certifications
Title	Details	Peak chart positions		Sales	Certifications
Title	Details	JPN	JPN Hot	Sales	Certifications
Keyakizaka46
Masshiro na Mono wa Yogoshitaku naru	Released: July 19, 2017; Label: Sony Music; Formats: CD, CD+DVD, digital download, streaming	1	1	JPN: 423,236 (phy.)	RIAJ: Platinum (phy.)
Sakurazaka46
As You Know?	Released: August 3, 2022; Label: Sony Music; Formats: CD, CD+Blu-ray, digital download, streaming	1	1	JPN: 136,932 (phy.)	RIAJ: Gold (phy.)
Addiction	Released: April 30, 2025; Label: Sony Music; Formats: CD, CD+Blu-ray, digital download, streaming	1	2	JPN: 183,502 (phy.)	RIAJ: Gold (phy.)

=== Compilation albums ===
List of compilation albums, with selected chart positions, sales and certifications
Title	Details	Peak chart positions		Sales	Certifications
Title	Details	JPN	JPN Hot	Sales	Certifications
Eien yori Nagai Isshun: Ano Koro, Tashika ni Sonzaishita Watashitachi	Released: October 7, 2020; Label: Sony Music; Formats: CD, CD+Blu-ray, digital download, streaming	1	1	JPN: 175,862	RIAJ: Gold (phy.)

=== Video albums ===
List of video albums, with selected chart positions, sales and certifications
Title	Details	Peak chart positions		Certifications
Title	Details	JPN DVD	JPN BD	Certifications
Keyaki Republic 2017	Released: September 26, 2018; Label: Sony Music; Formats: DVD, Blu-ray	1	1	RIAJ: Gold (phy.)
Keyaki Republic 2018	Released: August 14, 2019; Label: Sony Music; Formats: DVD, Blu-ray	1	1	RIAJ: Gold (phy.)
Keyakizaka46 Live at Tokyo Dome: Arena Tour 2019 Final	Released: January 29, 2020; Label: Sony Music; Formats: DVD, Blu-ray	1	1	RIAJ: Gold (phy.)
Keyaki Republic 2019	Released: August 8, 2020; Label: Sony Music; Formats: DVD, Blu-ray	1	1	
Keyakizaka46 The Last Live	Released: March 24, 2021; Label: Sony Music; Formats: DVD, Blu-ray	1	1	

=== Singles ===
List of singles, with selected chart positions, sales, certifications and album name
Title	Year	Peak chart positions		Sales	Certifications	Albums
Title	Year	JPN	JPN Hot	Sales	Certifications	Albums
Keyakizaka46
"Silent Majority" (サイレントマジョリティー)	2016	1	1	JPN: 376,871 (phy.)	RIAJ: 2× Platinum (phy.); 2× Platinum (dig.); Platinum (st.)	Masshiro na Mono wa Yogoshitaku naru
"Sekai ni wa Ai Shika Nai" (世界には愛しかない)	2016	1	1	JPN: 392,719 (phy.)	RIAJ: Platinum (phy.); Gold (dig.)	Masshiro na Mono wa Yogoshitaku naru
"Futari Saison" (二人セゾン)	2016	1	1	JPN: 376,871 (phy.)	RIAJ: 2× Platinum (phy.); Gold (dig.); Gold (st.)	Masshiro na Mono wa Yogoshitaku naru
"Fukyōwaon" (不協和音)	2017	1	1	JPN: 768,141 (phy.); JPN: 22,753 (dig.)	RIAJ: 3× Platinum (phy.); Gold (dig.); Gold (st.)	Masshiro na Mono wa Yogoshitaku naru
"Kaze ni Fukarete mo" (風に吹かれても)	2017	1	1	JPN: 723,517 (phy.); JPN: 14,401 (dig.)	RIAJ: 3× Platinum (phy.); Gold (dig.); Silver (st.)	Eien Yori Nagai Isshun: Ano Koro, Tashika ni Sonzaishita Watashitachi
"Glass wo Ware!" (ガラスを割れ!)	2018	1	1	JPN: 1,021,450 (phy.); JPN: 133,375 (dig.)	RIAJ: Million (phy.); Gold (dig.); Gold (st.)	Eien Yori Nagai Isshun: Ano Koro, Tashika ni Sonzaishita Watashitachi
"Ambivalent" (アンビバレント)	2018	1	1	JPN: 970,268 (phy.); JPN: 33,685 (dig.)	RIAJ: Million (phy.); Gold (dig.); Gold (st.)	Eien Yori Nagai Isshun: Ano Koro, Tashika ni Sonzaishita Watashitachi
"Kuroi Hitsuji" (黒い羊)	2019	1	1	JPN: 920,842 (phy.); JPN: 34,609 (dig.)	RIAJ: Million (phy.); Silver (st.)	Eien Yori Nagai Isshun: Ano Koro, Tashika ni Sonzaishita Watashitachi
"Dare ga Sono Kane o Narasu no ka?" (誰がその鐘を鳴らすのか?)	2020	— (Note: "Dare ga Sono Kane o Narasu no ka?" did not enter the Oricon Singles Chart, but peaked at number 1 on the Oricon Digital Singles Chart.)	14	JPN: 41,246 (dig.)		Eien Yori Nagai Isshun: Ano Koro, Tashika ni Sonzaishita Watashitachi
Sakurazaka46
"Nobody's Fault"	2020	1	1	JPN: 491,665 (phy.); JPN: 6,109 (dig.)	RIAJ: 2× Platinum (phy.)	As You Know?
"Ban"	2021	1	1	JPN: 429,916 (phy.); JPN: 5,583 (dig.)	RIAJ: 2× Platinum (phy.)	As You Know?
"Nagaredama" (流れ弾)	2021	1	1	JPN: 428,854 (phy.); JPN: 4,569 (dig.)	RIAJ: 2× Platinum (phy.)	As You Know?
"Samidare yo" (五月雨よ)	2022	1	1	JPN: 438,023 (phy.); JPN: 2,586 (dig.)	RIAJ: 2× Platinum (phy.)	As You Know?
"Sakurazuki" (桜月)	2023	1	2	JPN: 388,703 (phy.); JPN: 4,104 (dig.)	RIAJ: Platinum (phy.)	Addiction
"Start Over!"	2023	1	2	JPN: 474,301 (phy.)	RIAJ: 2× Platinum (phy.)	Addiction
"Shōninyokkyū" (承認欲求)	2023	1	1	JPN: 485,656 (phy.)	RIAJ: 2× Platinum (phy.)	Addiction
"Ikutsu no Koro ni Modoritai no ka?" (何歳の頃に戻りたいのか?)	2024	1	2	JPN: 465,981 (phy.)	RIAJ: 2× Platinum (phy.)	Addiction
"Jigōjitoku" (自業自得)	2024	2	2	JPN: 683,192 (phy.)	RIAJ: 3× Platinum (phy.)	Addiction
"I Want Tomorrow to Come"	2024	1	1	JPN: 509,434 (phy.)	RIAJ: 2× Platinum (phy.)	Addiction
"Udagawa Generation"	2025	1	1	JPN: 506,697 (phy.)	RIAJ: 2× Platinum (phy.)	Addiction
"Make or Break"	2025	1	1	JPN: 500,246 (phy.)	RIAJ: 2× Platinum (phy.)	TBA
"Unhappy Birthday Kōbun" (Unhappy birthday構文)	2025	1	2	JPN: 545,926 (phy.)	RIAJ: 2× Platinum (phy.)	TBA
"The Growing Up Train"	2026	1	1	JPN: 542,992 (phy.)	RIAJ: 2× Platinum (phy.)	TBA
"What's 'Kazoku'?"	2026	1	22	JPN: 522,666 (phy.)	RIAJ: 2× Platinum (phy.)	TBA
"Lonesome Rabbit"	2026	1	1	JPN: 522,666 (phy.)	RIAJ: 2× Platinum (phy.)	TBA
"Ai Must Be" (愛MUST BE)	2026	1	1	JPN: 565,375 (phy.)	RIAJ: 3× Platinum (phy.)	TBA

=== Promotional singles ===
List of promotional singles, with selected chart positions, showing year released, sales and album name
Title	Year	Peak	Sales	Albums
Title	Year	JPN Hot	Sales	Albums
Keyakizaka46
"Getsuyōbi no Asa, Skirt o Kirareta" (月曜日の朝、スカートを切られた)	2017	14		Masshiro na Mono wa Yogoshitaku naru
"Tsuno o Magaru" (角を曲がる)	2019	— (Note: "Tsuno o Magaru" did not enter the Billboard Japan Hot 100, but peaked at number 37 on the Download Songs Chart.)		Eien Yori Nagai Isshun: Ano Koro, Tashika ni Sonzaishita Watashitachi
"10 Gatsu no Pool ni Tobikonda" (10月のプールに飛び込んだ)	2020	— (Note: "10 Gatsu no Pool ni Tobikonda" did not enter the Billboard Japan Hot 100, but peaked at number 21 on the Download Songs Chart.)	JPN: 3,743 (dig.)	Eien Yori Nagai Isshun: Ano Koro, Tashika ni Sonzaishita Watashitachi
Sakurazaka46
"Masatsukeisu" (摩擦係数)	2022	26	JPN: 2,451 (dig.)	As You Know?
"Sono Hi made" (その日まで)	2022	71		"Sakurazuki"
"Kimi ga Sayonara Ietatte..." (君がサヨナラ言えたって・・・)	2023	92		Non-album promotional single
"Addiction"	2025	22		Addiction
"Audition" (with Nogizaka46 and Hinatazaka46 as Sakamichi Senbatsu)	2026	32		Non-album promotional single

=== Guest appearances ===
List of non-single guest appearances, with selected chart positions, showing year released and album name
Title	Year	Peak	Albums
Title	Year	JPN Hot	Albums
"Dare no Koto o Ichiban Aishiteru?" (誰のことを一番 愛してる?) (with AKB48 and Nogizaka46 as SakamichiAKB)	2017	37	"Shoot Sign"
"Kokkyo no Nai Jidai" (国境のない時代) (with AKB48 and Nogizaka46 as SakamichiAKB)	2018	—	"Jabaja"
"Hatsukoi Door" (初恋ドア) (with AKB48, Nogizaka46 and Hinatazaka46 as SakamichiAKB)	2019	—	"Jiwaru Days"
"Hitsuzensei" (必然性) (with AKB48, Nogizaka46 and Iz*One as IZ4648)	2019	—	"Jiwaru Days"

=== Other charted songs ===
List of other charted songs, with selected chart positions, showing year released and album name
Title	Year	Peak	Albums
Title	Year	JPN Hot	Albums
Keyakizaka46
"Kataru Nara Mirai o..." (語るなら未来を...)	2017	80	"Sekai ni wa Ai Shika Nai"
"W-Keyakizaka no Uta" (W-KEYAKIZAKAの詩)	2017	42	"Fukyōwaon"
"Wareta Sumaho" (割れたスマホ)	2017	76	"Fukyōwaon"
"Tuning" (チューニング)	2017	81	"Fukyōwaon"
"Eccentric" (エキセントリック)	2017	12	"Fukyōwaon"
"Natsu no Hana wa Himawari Dake Ja Nai" (夏の花は向日葵だけじゃない)	2017	66	Masshiro na Mono wa Yogoshitaku naru
"Hiraishin" (避雷針)	2017	22	"Kaze ni Fukarete mo"
"Soredemo Aruiteru" (それでも歩いてる)	2017	92	"Kaze ni Fukarete mo"
"Mō Mori e Kaerou ka?" (もう森へ帰ろうか?)	2018	81	"Glass wo Ware!"
"Hi ga Noboru Made" (日が昇るまで)	2018	94	"Ambivalent"
Sakurazaka46
"Naze Koi o Shite Konakattan darō?" (なぜ 恋をして来なかったんだろう?)	2020	94	"Nobody's Fault"

== Filmography ==
=== Television shows ===
Original release	Title	Original network	Ref(s)
October 4, 2015 – October 12, 2020	Keyakitte, Kakenai? (欅って、書けない?)	TV Tokyo	
July 5, 2016 – September 26, 2016	KeyaBingo!	NTV	
July 17, 2016 – October 2, 2016	Who Killed Tokuyama Daigoro? Tokuyama Daigorō o Dare ga Koroshitaka?) (徳山大五郎を誰が殺したか?)	TV Tokyo	
January 9, 2017 – March 27, 2017	KeyaBingo!2	NTV	
May 18, 2017 – July 20, 2017	Zankokuna Kankyakutachi (残酷な観客達)	NTV	
July 17, 2017 – September 25, 2017	KeyaBingo!3	NTV	
October 13, 2017	Re:Mind	Netflix & TV Tokyo	
April 8, 2018 – present	Hiragana Oshi (ひらがな推し)	TV Tokyo	
April 16, 2018 – present	KeyaBingo!4 Hiragana Keyakitte Nani? (KEYABINGO!4 ひらがなけやきって何？)	NTV	
October 18, 2020 – present	Soko Magattara, Sakurazaka? (そこ曲がったら、櫻坂?)	TV Tokyo	

=== Radio shows ===
Original release	Title	Original network	Ref(s)
January 5, 2016	Keyakizaka46 no All Night Nippon	Nippon Broadcasting System	
January 31, February 28, and March 27, 2016	Keyakizaka46 no All Night Nippon R (欅坂46のオールナイトニッポンR)	Nippon Broadcasting System	
2016	Keyakizaka46 Kochira Yūrakuchō Hoshizora Hōsōkyoku	Nippon Broadcasting System	

== Awards ==
Year	Ceremony	Award	Nominee/work	Result
2016	Yahoo Japan Search Grand Prix	Idol Group Award	Keyakizaka46	Won
2017	31st Japan Gold Disc Award	New Artist of the Year	Keyakizaka46	Won
2017	The 5th V Chart Awards	Top New Artist Award (Japan)	Keyakizaka46	Won
2017	Yahoo Japan Search Grand Prix	Idol Group Award	Keyakizaka46	Won
2017	59th Japan Record Awards	Excellent Work Award	"Kaze ni Fukarete mo"	Won
2017	50th Japan Cable Awards	Excellent Music Award	"Kaze ni Fukarete mo"	Won
2017	MTV VMAJ	Best Buzz Award	Keyakizaka46	Won
2018	60th Japan Record Awards	Excellent Work Award	"Ambivalent"	Won
2018	MTV VMAJ	Best MV of Japanese Group	"Ambivalent"	Won
2018	10th CD shop Awards	Finalist Award	Masshiro na Mono wa Yogoshitaku naru	Won
2018	The 31st Shogakukan DIME Trend Award	Best Character Award	Keyakizaka46	Won
2019	MTV VMAJ	Best MV of Japanese Group	"Kuroi Hitsuji"	Won
2019	61st Japan Record Awards	Excellent Work Award	"Kuroi Hitsuji"	Won
2021	MTV Europe Music Awards	Best Japanese Act	Sakurazaka46	Won
2023	MTV VMAJ	Best Dance Video	"Start over!"	Won
2023	8th Asia Artist Awards	AAA Popularity Award (Female Singer)	Sakurazaka46	Won
2023	8th Asia Artist Awards	Best Musician Award	Sakurazaka46	Won
