= Yurina Hirate =

Japanese actress and singer (born 2001)

Yurina Hirate 平手 友梨奈
- Born: June 25, 2001 (age 25)
- Origin: Aichi Prefecture, Japan
- Genre: J-pop
- Occupations: Actress; singer
- Years active: 2015–present
- Labels: Virgin; Capitol; Cloud Nine
- Formerly of: Keyakizaka46
- Spouse: Fūju Kamio (m. 2026)
- Website: www.universal-music.co.jp/hirate-yurina/

Yurina Hirate (平手 友梨奈, Hirate Yurina; born June 25, 2001) is a Japanese singer and actress. She was the lead performer of the idol group Keyakizaka46 (now Sakurazaka46) until she started her solo career in 2020. As an actress, she has won awards for her starring role in Hibiki (2018) and appeared in Dragon Zakura 2 (2021) and The Fable: The Killer Who Doesn't Kill (2021).

== Early life and education ==
Yurina Hirate was born on June 25, 2001. In March 2017, she graduated from junior high school.

== Career ==
Hirate was the choreography center of the idol group Keyakizaka46 for eight singles. When she was selected as the center for the first time (for Keyakizaka46's debut single "Silent Majority", released in April 2016), she was 14 and was the youngest member of the girl group. The second Keyakizaka46's single "Sekai ni wa Ai Shika Nai" (released in August 2016) contained Hirate's solo song as one of the coupling tracks.

On October 8, 2016, at the GirlsAward 2016 Autumn/Winter show, she made her catwalk debut. In January 2017, she and Rika Watanabe (also from Keyakizaka46) appeared as models in the women's fashion magazine Larme for the first time. The 2017/14 issue of the manga magazine Weekly Young Jump (released on March 2) marked her first solo magazine cover. In the 2017/16 issue of the manga magazine Weekly Shōnen Magazine, she again had a solo cover.

In June 2016, she made her acting debut in Keyakizaka46's TV drama Who Killed Daigoro Tokuyama? (徳山大五郎を誰が殺したか?). Since April 17, 2017, she has been a regular on a popular radio show for teenagers titled School of Lock! on Tokyo FM. Hirate played one of the lead roles in the 2017 Nippon TV dorama Cruel Crowd (残酷な観客達).

Hirate withdrew from Keyakizaka46 on January 23, 2020.

On December 9, 2020, Hirate performed her debut single "Dance no Riyū" for the first time at the FNS Music Festival. The single was later released digitally on December 25 with an accompanying music video released three days earlier. Her second single "Kakegae no Nai Sekai" was released on September 24, 2021. A music video for the song was later released on December 26, 2021.

On December 21, 2022, Hirate was announced to be the first artist to sign with Naeco, a newly established label under Hybe Japan, in order to expand her career globally. She was set to join the company's social platform, Weverse, in early 2023.

In July 2024, Hybe announced that they had decided to terminate Hirate's contract. On September 1, 2024, Hirate revealed that she had officially signed with Cloud Nine.

== Public image ==
Hirate has been dubbed a "rebirth of Momoe Yamaguchi", "a masterpiece beyond Atsuko Maeda" and called one of the most attractive idols of 2016.

== Personal life ==
Hirate is skilled at basketball, ballet, cartwheels, monkey bars, and blowing up balloons. When Hirate was little, she was influenced by her friends from nursery school and fell in love with basketball. She joined her school's basketball club in second grade and was assigned to the position of centre. Her team even won a championship at a tournament when she was in 6th grade. Hirate also studied ballet from the ages of five to twelve years old.

In February 2026, Hirate announced her marriage to actor Fūju Kamio.

== Discography ==
=== Studio albums ===
List of studio albums, showing selected details, peak chart positions and sales
Title	Details	Peak chart positions		Sales
Title	Details	JPN	JPN Cmb.	Sales
Blank Expression	Released: June 3, 2026; Label: Capitol; Formats: CD, CD+DVD, DL, streaming	11	13	JPN: 5,040

=== Singles ===
List of singles, with selected chart positions and album name
Title	Year	Peaks		Album
Title	Year	JPN Cmb.	JPN Hot	Album
"Dance no Riyū"	2020	49	34	Non-album single
"Kakegae no Nai Sekai"	2021	— (Note: "Kakegae no Nai Sekai" did not enter the Oricon Combined Singles Chart, but peaked at number four on the Digital Singles Chart.)	— (Note: "Kakegae no Nai Sekai" did not enter the Billboard Japan Hot 100, but peaked at number six on the Download Songs.)	Non-album single
"Zetsubō no Megami"	2024	— (Note: "Zetsubō no Megami" did not enter the Oricon Combined Singles Chart, but peaked at number 38 on the Digital Singles Chart.)	— (Note: "Zetsubō no Megami" did not enter the Billboard Japan Hot 100, but peaked at number 44 on the Download Songs.)	Non-album single
"Bleeding Love"	2024	— (Note: "Bleeding Love" did not enter the Oricon Combined Singles Chart, but peaked at number 16 on the Digital Singles Chart.)	— (Note: "Bleeding Love" did not enter the Billboard Japan Hot 100, but peaked at number 15 on the Download Songs.)	Blank Expression
"All I Want"	2024	— (Note: "All I Want" did not enter the Oricon Combined Singles Chart, but peaked at number 13 on the Digital Singles Chart.)	— (Note: "All I Want" did not enter the Billboard Japan Hot 100, but peaked at number 13 on the Download Songs.)	Blank Expression
"Eeny Meeny Miny Moe"	2025	— (Note: "Eeny Meeny Miny Moe" did not enter the Oricon Combined Singles Chart, but peaked at number seven on the Digital Singles Chart.)	— (Note: "Eeny Meeny Miny Moe" did not enter the Billboard Japan Hot 100, but peaked at number seven on the Download Songs.)	Blank Expression
"I'm Human"	2025	— (Note: "I'm Human" did not enter the Oricon Combined Singles Chart, but peaked at number nine on the Digital Singles Chart.)	— (Note: "I'm Human" did not enter the Billboard Japan Hot 100, but peaked at number 11 on the Download Songs.)	Blank Expression
"The Foolproof Way to Raise a Menhera"	2025	— (Note: "The Foolproof Way to Raise a Menhera" did not enter the Oricon Combined Singles Chart, but peaked at number 22 on the Digital Singles Chart.)	— (Note: "The Foolproof Way to Raise a Menhera" did not enter the Billboard Japan Hot 100, but peaked at number 26 on the Download Songs.)	Blank Expression
"Kill or Kiss"	2026	— (Note: "Kill or Kiss" did not enter the Oricon Combined Singles Chart, but peaked at number 20 on the Digital Singles Chart.)	— (Note: "Kill or Kiss" did not enter the Billboard Japan Hot 100, but peaked at number 22 on the Download Songs.)	Blank Expression
"—" denotes releases that did not chart or were not released in that region.

=== Music videos ===
==== As lead artist ====
List of music videos as lead artist showing year released and director
Title	Year	Director(s)	Ref.
"Dance no Riyū"	2020	Ryohei Shingu	
"Kakegae no Nai Sekai"	2021	Ryohei Shingu	
"Bleeding Love"	2024		
"All I Want"	2024		

==== Guest appearances ====
of music videos as guest appearance, showing year released, lead artist and director
Title	Year	Lead artist	Director(s)	Ref.
"Stargazer" (スターゲイザー)	2019	Sekai no Owari	Yūichirō Fujishiro	
"Wanted! Wanted!" (Side Story Ver.)	2020	Mrs. Green Apple	Masafumi Taguchi	

== Filmography ==
=== Films ===
Yurina Hirate's film credits
Year	Title	Role	Notes	Ref.
2018	Hibiki	Hibiki Akui	Leading role	
2021	The Night Beyond the Tricornered Window	Erika Hiura		
2021	The Fable: The Killer Who Doesn't Kill	Hinako		

=== Television ===
Yurina Hirate's television credits
Year	Title	Role	Network	Notes	Ref.
2016	Who Killed Daigoro Tokuyama?	Yurina Hirate	TV Tokyo	Leading role	
2017	Cruel Crowd	Yuzuki Hayama	NTV	Leading role	
2021	Dragon Zakura 2	Kaede Iwasaki	TBS		
2021	Run Through the Wind	Mizuho Ashihara	NHK General TV	Leading role	
2022	Maison Häagen-Dazs: 8 Happy Stories	Nanami Minatogawa	YouTube	Leading role, mini web series	
2022	Roppongi Class	Aoi Asamiya	TV Asahi	Leading role	

== Awards and nominations ==
Name of the award ceremony, with year presented, nominated work, award category, and the result of the nomination
Award ceremony	Year (Note: Indicates the year of ceremony. Each year is linked to the article about the awards held that year, wherever possible.)	Category	Nominee/work	Result	Ref.
Blue Ribbon Awards	2019	Best Newcomer	Hibiki	Nominated	
Blue Ribbon Awards	2022	Best Supporting Actress	The Fable: The Killer Who Doesn't Kill	Nominated	
Elan d'or Awards	2019	Newcomer of the Year	Hibiki	Nominated	
Hochi Film Award	2019	Best Actress	Hibiki	Nominated	
Hochi Film Award	2021	Best Supporting Actress	The Fable: The Killer Who Doesn't Kill	Nominated	
Japan Academy Film Prize	2019	Newcomer of the Year	Hibiki	Won	
Japanese Movie Critics Award	2019	New Actress Award	Hibiki	Won	
Mainichi Film Awards	2019	Best Newcomer	Hibiki	Nominated	
Nikkan Sports Film Award	2019	Best Newcomer	Hibiki	Won	
Nikkan Sports Drama Grand Prix	2021	Best Supporting Actress	Dragon Zakura 2	2nd place	
Tokyo Sports Film Award	2019	Best Newcomer	Hibiki	Nominated	
